= Ancient Roman and Byzantine domes =

Domes were a characteristic element of the architecture of Ancient Rome and of its medieval continuation, the Byzantine Empire. They had widespread influence on contemporary and later styles, from Russian and Ottoman architecture to the Italian Renaissance and modern revivals. The domes were customarily hemispherical, although octagonal and segmented shapes are also known, and they developed in form, use, and structure over the centuries. Early examples rested directly on the rotunda walls of round rooms and featured a central oculus for ventilation and light. Pendentives became common in the Byzantine period, provided support for domes over square spaces.

Early wooden domes are known only from a literary source, but the use of wooden formwork, concrete, and unskilled labor enabled domes of monumental size in the late Republic and early Imperial period, such as the so-called "Temple of Mercury" bath hall at Baiae. Nero introduced the dome into Roman palace architecture in the 1st century and such rooms served as state banqueting halls, audience rooms, or throne rooms. The Pantheon's dome, the largest and most famous example, was built of concrete in the 2nd century and may have served as an audience hall for Hadrian. Imperial mausolea, such as the Mausoleum of Diocletian, were domed beginning in the 3rd century. Some smaller domes were built with a technique of using ceramic tubes in place of a wooden centering for concrete, or as a permanent structure embedded in the concrete, but light brick became the preferred building material over the course of the 4th and 5th centuries. Brick ribs allowed for a thinner structure and facilitated the use of windows in the supporting walls, replacing the need for an oculus as a light source.

Christian baptisteries and shrines were domed in the 4th century, such as the Lateran Baptistery and the likely wooden dome over the Church of the Holy Sepulchre. Constantine's octagonal church in Antioch may have been a precedent for similar buildings for centuries afterward. The first domed basilica may have been built in the 5th century, with a church in southern Turkey being the earliest proposed example, but the 6th century architecture of Justinian made domed church architecture standard throughout the Roman east. His Hagia Sophia and Church of the Holy Apostles inspired copies in later centuries.

Cruciform churches with domes at their crossings, such as the churches of Hagia Sophia in Thessaloniki and St. Nicholas at Myra, were typical of 7th and 8th century architecture and bracing a dome with barrel vaults on four sides became the standard structural system. Domes over windowed drums of cylindrical or polygonal shape were standard after the 9th century. In the empire's later period, smaller churches were built with smaller diameter domes, normally less than 6 meters (20 ft) after the 10th century. Exceptions include the 11th century domed-octagons of Hosios Loukas and Nea Moni, and the 12th century Chora Church, among others. The cross-in-square plan, with a single dome at the crossing or five domes in a quincunx pattern, as at the Church of St. Panteleimon, was the most popular type from the 10th century until the fall of Constantinople in 1453.

== Overview ==
Rounded arches, vaults, and domes distinguish Roman architecture from that of Ancient Greece and were facilitated by the use of concrete and brick. By varying the weight of the aggregate material in the concrete, the weight of the concrete could be altered, allowing lighter layers to be laid at the top of concrete domes. But concrete domes also required expensive wooden formwork, also called shuttering, to be built and kept in place during the curing process, which would usually have to be destroyed to be removed. Formwork for brick domes need not be kept in place as long and could be more easily reused. The mortar and aggregate of Roman concrete was built up in horizontal layers laid by hand against wooden form-work with the thickness of the layers determined by the length of the workday, rather than being poured into a mold as concrete is today. Roman concrete domes were thus built similarly to the earlier corbel domes of the Mediterranean region, although they have different structural characteristics. The aggregate used by the Romans was often rubble, but lightweight aggregate in the upper levels served to reduce stresses. Empty "vases and jugs" could be hidden inside to reduce weight. The dry concrete mixtures used by the Romans were compacted with rams to eliminate voids, and added animal blood acted as a water reducer. Because Roman concrete was weak in tension, it did not provide any structural advantage over the use of brick or stone. But, because it could be constructed with unskilled slave labor, it provided a constructional advantage and facilitated the building of large-scale domes.

Roman domes were used in baths, villas, palaces, and tombs. Oculi were common features. They were customarily hemispherical in shape and partially or totally concealed on the exterior. In order to buttress the horizontal thrusts of a large hemispherical masonry dome, the supporting walls were built up beyond the base to at least the haunches of the dome and the dome was then also sometimes covered with a conical or polygonal roof. A variety of other shapes, including shallow saucer domes, segmental domes, and ribbed domes were also sometimes used. Stone or brick ribs were usually flush with the inside surface of Roman domes where they would not have been visible. The audience halls of many imperial palaces were domed. Domes were "closely associated with senatorial, imperial, and state-sponsored patrons" and proliferated in the capital cities and other cities with imperial affiliations. Domes were also very common over polygonal garden pavilions. Depictions on late Roman coins suggest that wooden bulbous domes sheathed in metal were used on late Roman towers in the eastern portion of the empire. The use of terracotta vaulting tubes proliferated in Roman North Africa in the 3rd century and were used in the Western Mediterranean areas of Southern France, Sicily, Italy, and along the Adriatic coast. The tubes were held together with gypsum mortar, which sets quickly but is water soluble and cannot be exposed to the elements, so they were either used as permanent centering that was covered with lime mortar concrete or formed the vault itself and were covered by timber roofing. Construction and development of domes declined in the west with the decline and fall of the western portion of the empire. There were continual developments in dome construction and continuity of symbolism into the Byzantine period, along with changes in dome function for religious structures.

In Byzantine architecture, a supporting structure of four arches with pendentives between them allowed the spaces below domes to be opened up. Pendentives allowed for weight loads to be concentrated at just four points on a more practical square plan, rather than a circle. In west Asia Minor, most vaulted churches had rectangular bays defined by piers supporting arches spanning up to 14 meters and sail vaults or hemispherical domes on pendentives. Until the 9th century, domes were low with thick buttressing and did not project much into the exterior of their buildings. Drums were cylindrical when used and likewise low and thick. After the 9th century, domes were built higher and used polygonal drums decorated with engaged columns and arcades. Exterior dome decoration was more elaborate by the 12th century and included engaged columns along with niches, blind arcades, and string courses. Multiple domes on a single building were normal. A "so-called 'Athenian dome'" type had an octagonal drum with a corrugated cornice of semi-circular eaves and a thin marble column at each corner. Typically there was a single window on each side of the octagon. Byzantine dome interiors that were uniformly illuminated, and often brighter than other interior surfaces, achieved this through deliberately shaped windowsills that reflected light up and into the dome.

Domes were important elements of baptisteries, churches, and tombs. They were normally hemispherical and had, with occasional exceptions, windowed drums. Roofing for domes ranged from simple ceramic tile to more expensive, more durable, and more form-fitting lead sheeting. The domes and drums typically incorporated wooden tension rings at several levels to resist deformation in the mortar and allow for faster construction. Metal clamps between stone cornice blocks, metal tie rods, and metal chains were also used to stabilize domed buildings. Timber belts at the bases of domes helped to stabilize the walls below them during earthquakes, but the domes themselves remained vulnerable to collapse. The surviving ribbed or pumpkin dome examples in Constantinople are structurally equivalent and those techniques were used interchangeably, with the number of divisions corresponding to the number of windows. Aided by the small scale of churches after the 6th century, such ribbed domes could be built with formwork only for the ribs. Pumpkin domes could have been built in self-supporting rings and small domical vaults were effectively corbelled, dispensing with formwork altogether.

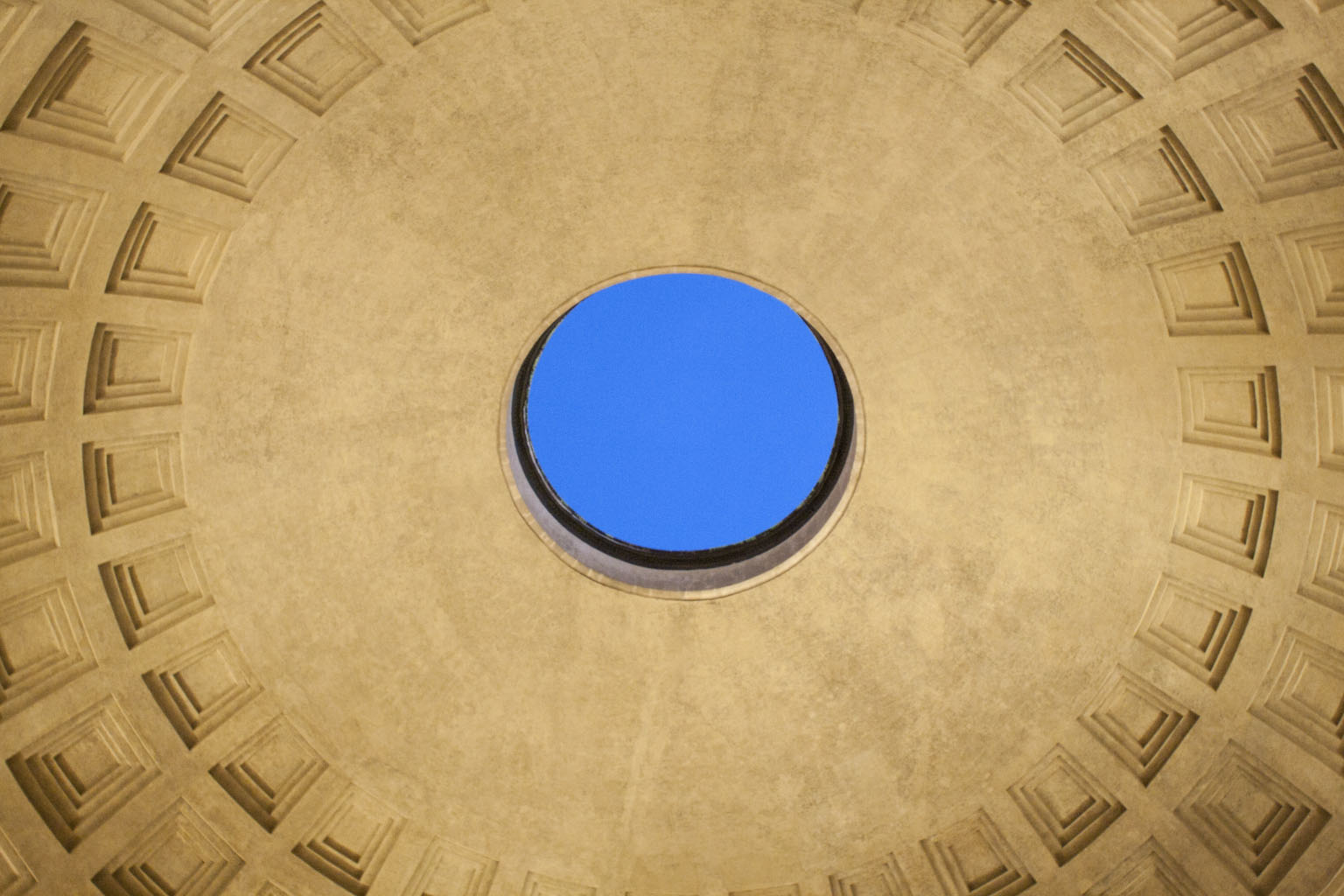
The circular oculus of the Pantheon, at the center of the domed ceiling

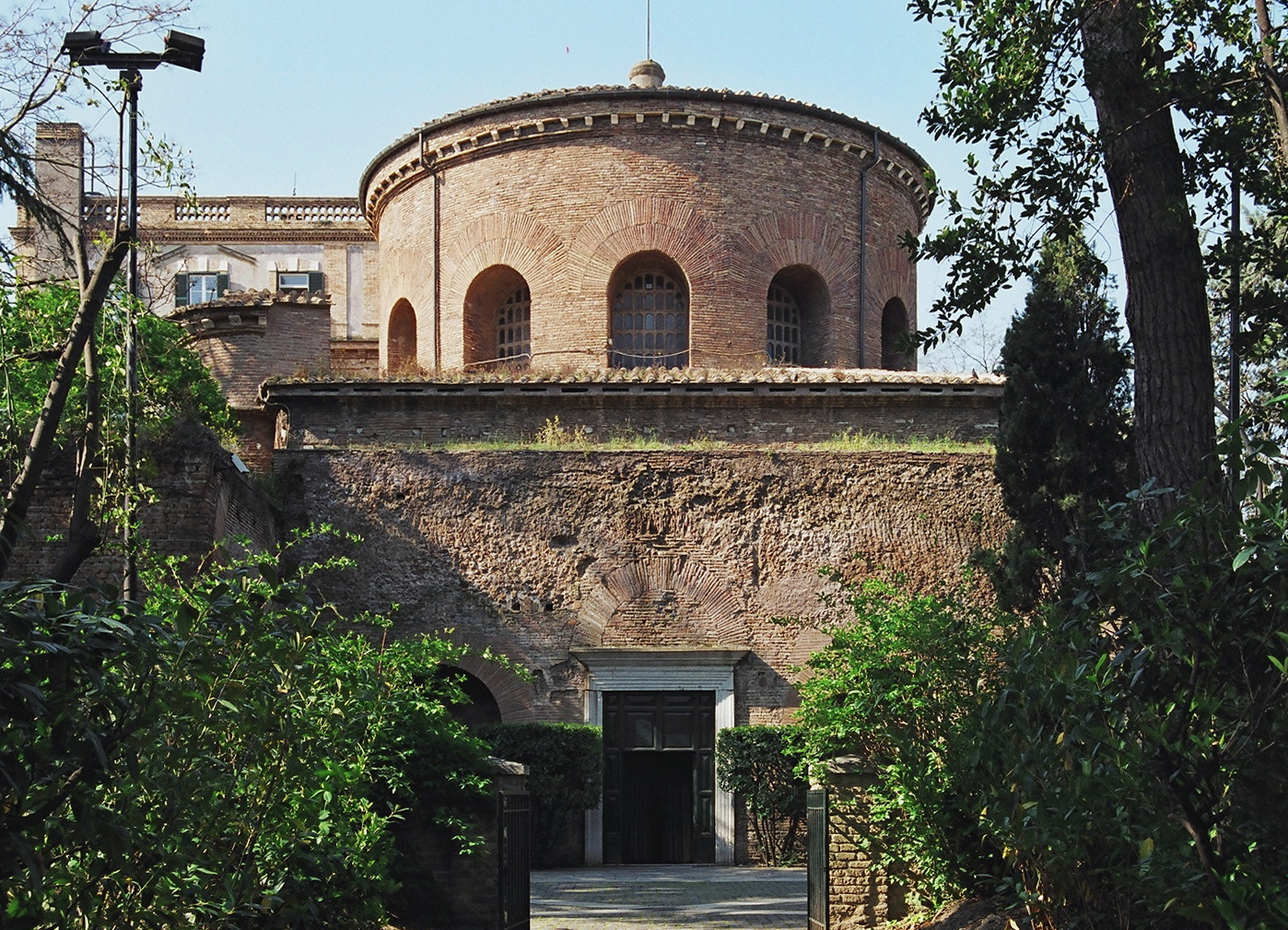
The dome of Santa Costanza is concealed externally by the buttressing of its cylindrical drum

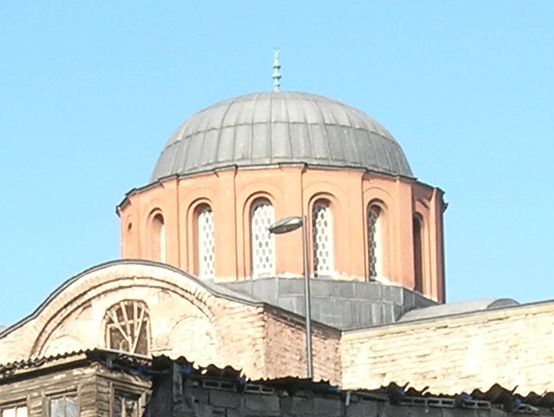
A dome of the former Pantokrator Monastery, showing an exposed external profile and lead roofing

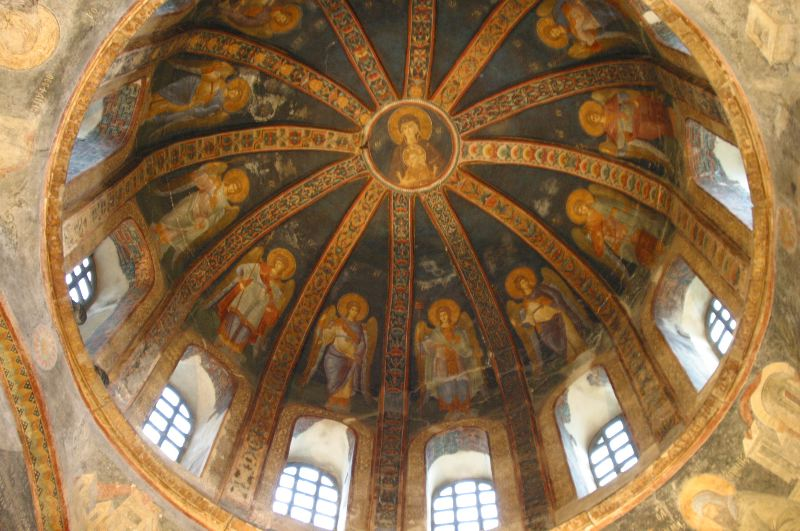
A dome at Chora Church, with ribs from between the drum windows converging on a circular fresco image

== History ==
=== Late Republic and early Imperial period ===
Roman baths played a leading role in the development of domed construction in general, and monumental domes in particular. Modest domes in baths dating from the 2nd and 1st centuries BC are seen in Pompeii, in the cold rooms of the Terme Stabiane and the Terme del Foro. These domes are very conical in shape, similar to those on an Assyrian bas-relief found in Nineveh. At a Roman era tepidarium in Cabrera de Mar, Spain, a dome has been identified from the middle of the 2nd century BC that used a refined version of the parallel arch construction found in an earlier Hellenistic bath dome in Sicily. According to Vitruvius, the temperature and humidity of domed warm rooms could be regulated by raising or lowering bronze discs located under an oculus. Domes were particularly well suited to the hot rooms of baths circular in plan to facilitate even heating from the walls. However, the extensive use of domes did not occur before the 1st century AD. The resistance of pozzolana concrete to intensive moisture conditions made it well suited for bath halls and explains why the earliest concrete domes are found at bath complexes.

Varro's book on agriculture describes an aviary (Varro's Aviary) with a wooden dome decorated with the eight winds that is compared by analogy to the eight winds depicted on the Tower of the Winds, which was built in Athens at about the same time. This aviary with its wooden dome may represent a fully developed type. Wooden domes in general would have allowed for very wide spans. Their earlier use may have inspired the development and introduction of large stone domes of previously unprecedented size. Complex wooden forms were necessary for dome centering and support during construction, and they seem to have eventually become more efficient and standardized over time. The "so-called tomb of Ummidia" is a domed Greek cross structure dated to either the 1st century BC or the 1st century AD. The hemispherical dome was made from large stone ashlar blocks pierced by four holes with shafts extending diagonally up to the outside surface.

Domes reached monumental size in the Roman Imperial period. Although imprints of the formwork itself have not survived, deformations from the ideal of up to 22 centimeters (8.7 in) at the so-called "Temple of Mercury" in Baiae suggest a centering of eight radiating frames, with horizontal connectors supporting radial formwork for the shallow dome. The building, actually a concrete frigidarium pool for a bath, dates to either the late Roman Republic, or the reign of the first emperor Augustus (27 BC – 14 AD), making it the first large Roman dome. There are five openings in the dome: a circular oculus and four square skylights. The dome has a span of 21.5 meters (71 ft) and is the largest known dome built before that of the Pantheon. It is also the earliest preserved concrete dome. The Baths of Agrippa in the city of Rome, built in the last quarter of the 1st century BC, may have had a domed rotunda hall 25 meters in diameter.

=== First century ===
While there are earlier examples in the Republican period and early Imperial period, the growth of domed construction increased under Emperor Nero and the Flavians in the 1st century AD, and during the 2nd century. Centrally planned halls become increasingly important parts of palace and palace villa layouts beginning in the 1st century, serving as state banqueting halls, audience rooms, or throne rooms. Formwork was arranged either horizontally or radially, but there is not enough surviving evidence from the 1st and 2nd centuries to say what was typical.

The opulent palace architecture of the Emperor Nero (54 – 68 AD) marks an important development. In Nero's Domus Aurea, or "Golden House", planned by Severus and Celer, the walls of a large octagonal room transition to an octagonal domical vault, which then transitions to a dome with an oculus. This is the earliest known example of a dome in the city of Rome itself.

According to Suetonius, the Domus Aurea had a dome that perpetually rotated on its base in imitation of the sky.

The only intact dome from the reign of Emperor Domitian is a 16.1-meter (53 ft) wide example in what may have been a nymphaeum at his villa at Albano. It is now the church of Santa Maria della Rotunda.

=== Second century ===
During the reign of Emperor Trajan, domes and semi-domes over exedras were standard elements of Roman architecture, possibly due to the efforts of Trajan's architect, Apollodorus of Damascus, who was famed for his engineering ability. Two rotundas 20 meters (66 ft) in diameter were finished in 109 AD as part of the Baths of Trajan, built over the Domus Aurea, and exedras 13 and 18 meters (43 and 59 ft) wide were built as part of the markets north-east of his forum. The architecture of Trajan's successor, Hadrian, continued this style.

The Pantheon in Rome, completed by Emperor Hadrian as part of the Baths of Agrippa, has the most famous, best preserved, and largest Roman dome. It was completed in 125. Although considered an example of Hadrianic architecture, there is brickstamp evidence that the rebuilding of the Pantheon in its present form was begun under Trajan. Speculation that the architect of the Pantheon was Apollodorus has not been proven, although there are stylistic commonalities between his large coffered half-domes at Trajan's Baths and the dome of the Pantheon. The dome of the Pantheon is unreinforced concrete spanning 43.4 meters (142 ft) and resting on a circular wall, or rotunda, 6 meters (20 ft) thick. Its diameter was more than twice as wide as any known earlier dome. No later dome built in the Imperial era came close to the span of the Pantheon. It remained the largest dome in the world for more than a millennium and is still the world's largest unreinforced concrete dome.

Many commentators have cited the Pantheon as an example of the revolutionary possibilities for monolithic architecture provided by the use of Roman pozzolana concrete. However, vertical cracks seem to have developed very early, such that in practice the dome acts as an array of arches with a common keystone, rather than as a single unit. The exterior step-rings used to compress the "haunches" of the dome, which would not be necessary if the dome acted as a monolithic structure, may be an acknowledgement of this by the builders themselves. Such buttressing was common in Roman arch construction.

Hadrian's architecture includes a variety of innovative domes used in baths, triclinia, temples, and nymphaea. Segmented domes made of radially concave wedges, or of alternating concave and flat wedges, appear under Hadrian in the 2nd century and most preserved examples of the style date from this period. Hadrian's villa has examples at the Piazza d'Oro and in the semidome of the Serapeum. Recorded details of the decoration of the segmented dome at the Piazza d'Oro suggests it was made to evoke a billowing tent, perhaps in imitation of the canopies used by Hellenistic kings.

In the middle of the 2nd century, some of the largest domes were built near present-day Naples, as part of large bath complexes taking advantage of the volcanic hot springs in the area. At the bath complex at Baiae, there are remains of a collapsed dome spanning 26.3 meters (86 ft), called the "Temple of Venus", and a larger half-collapsed dome spanning 29.5 meters (97 ft) called the "Temple of Diana".

After the second half of the 2nd century, oculus openings became less of a practical feature in domes than a design element.

In the second half of the 2nd century in North Africa, a distinctive type of nozzle tube shape was developed in the tradition of the terracotta tube dome at the Hellenistic era baths of Morgantina, an idea that had been preserved in the use of interlocking terracotta pots for kiln roofs. This tube could be mass-produced on potter's wheels and interlocked to form a permanent centering for concrete domes, avoiding the use of wooden centering altogether. This spread mainly in the western Mediterranean.

Although rarely used, the pendentive dome was known in 2nd century Roman architecture and possibly earlier, in funerary monuments such as the Sedia dei Diavolo and the Torracio della Secchina on the Via Nomentana. Pendentive domes would be used much more widely in the Byzantine period.

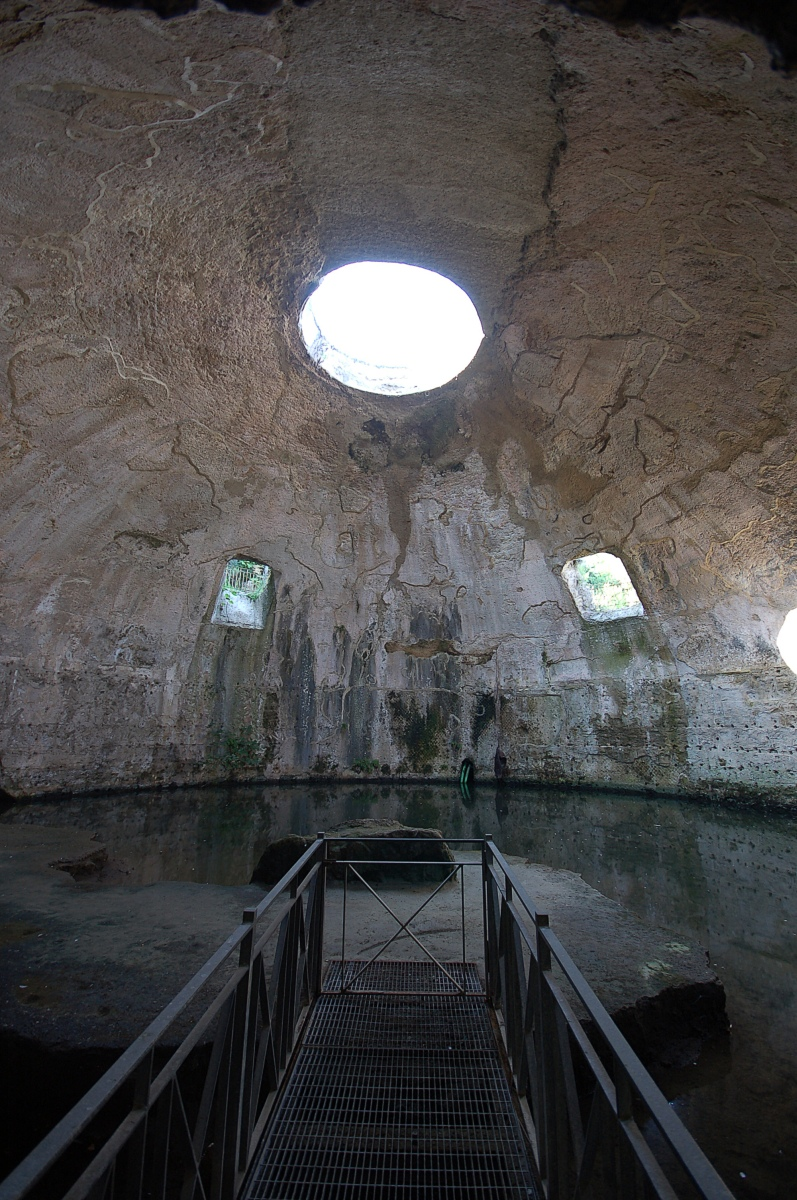
Flooded ruins of the so-called "Temple of Mercury" in Baiae

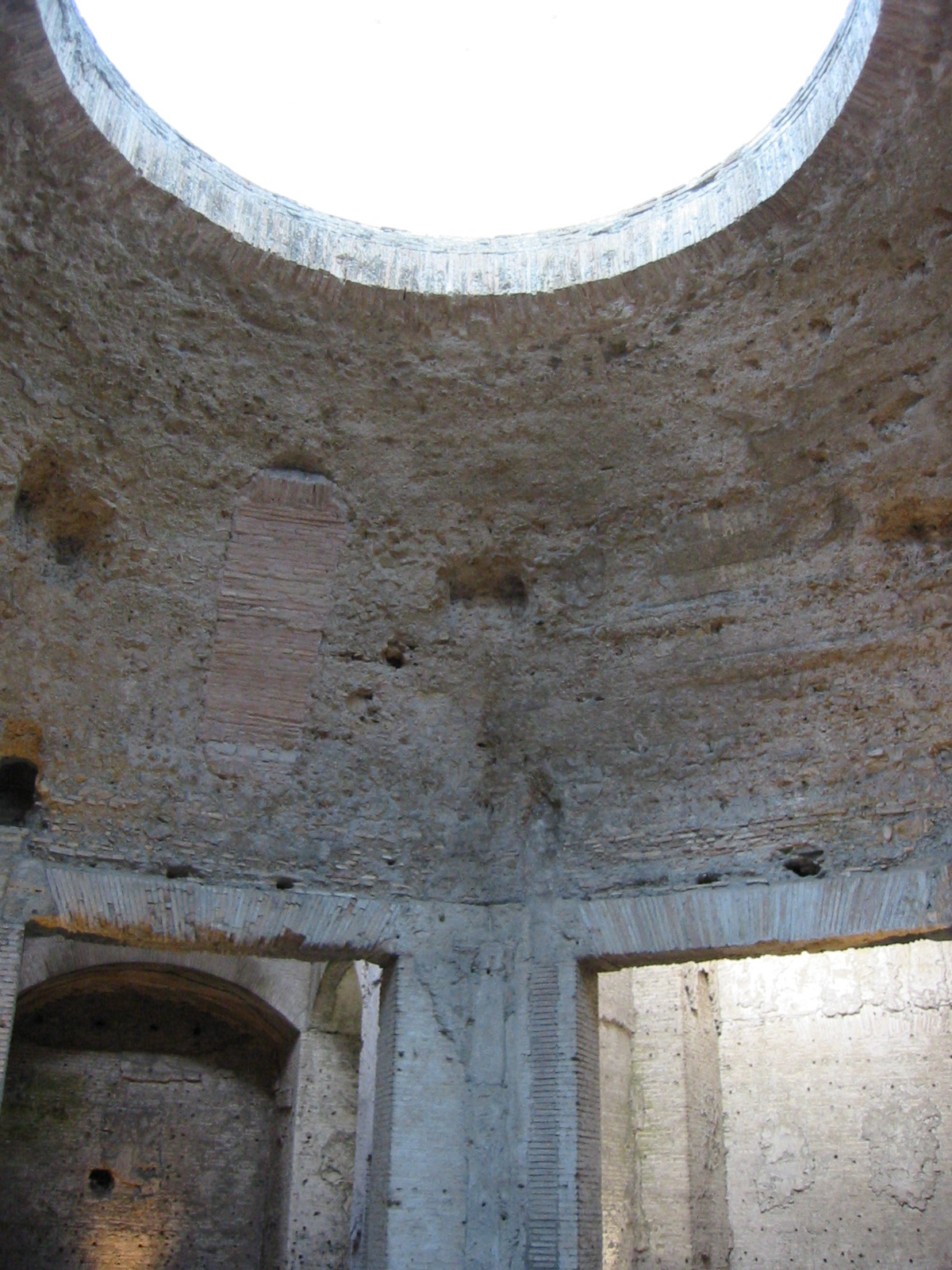
The octagonal domed hall found in Nero's Domus Aurea

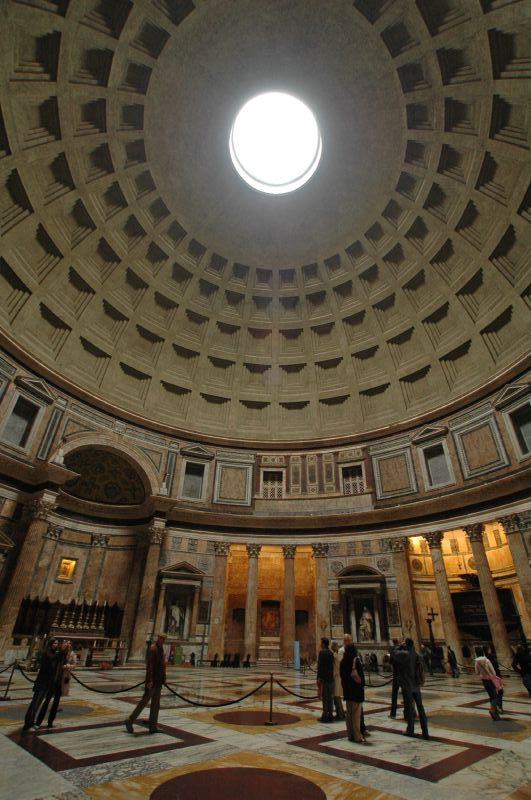
The Pantheon in Rome

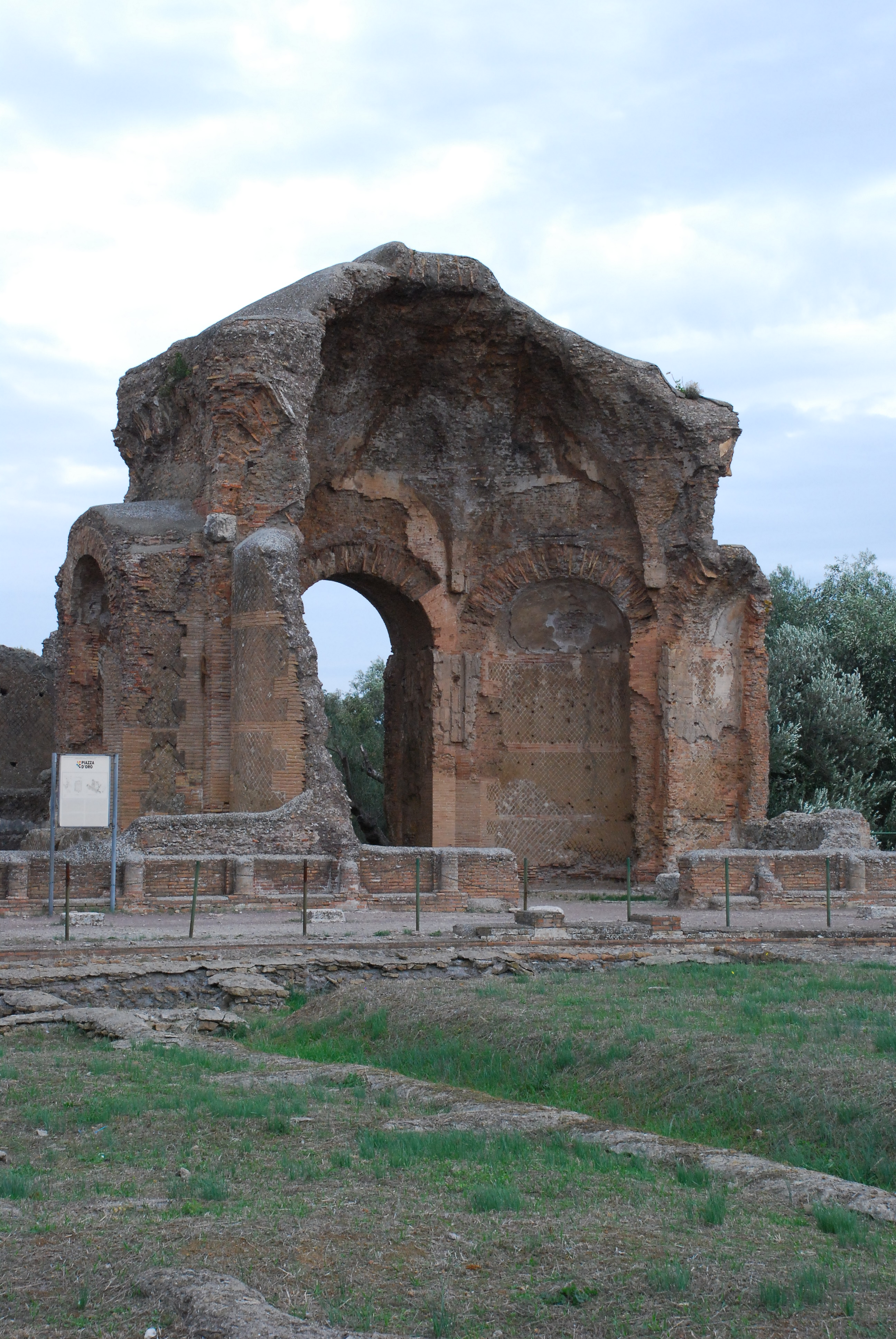
Piazza d'Oro vestibule ruins at Hadrian's Villa

=== Third century ===
In the 3rd century, imperial mausolea began to be built as domed rotundas rather than tumulus structures or other types, following similar monuments by private citizens. Pagan and Christian domed mausolea from this time can be differentiated in that the structures of the buildings also reflect their religious functions. The pagan buildings are typically two story, dimly lit, free-standing structures with a lower crypt area for the remains and an upper area for devotional sacrifice. Christian domed mausolea contain a single well-lit space and are usually attached to a church. The use of the circular or octagonal domed rotunda for imperial mausolea began with Emperor Gallienus in the 260s and the type would be used throughout the late-antique period.

The technique of building lightweight domes with interlocking hollow ceramic tubes further developed in North Africa and Italy in the late 3rd and early 4th centuries. By the 4th century, the thin and lightweight tubed vaulting had become a vaulting technique in its own right, rather than simply serving as a permanent centering for concrete. It was used in early Christian buildings in Italy. Arranging these terracotta tubes in a continuous spiral created a dome that was not strong enough for very large spans, but required only minimal centering and formwork.

=== Fourth century ===
In the 4th century, Roman domes proliferated due to changes in the way domes were constructed, including advances in centering techniques and the use of brick ribbing. The so-called "Temple of Minerva Medica", for example, used brick ribs along with step-rings and lightweight pumice aggregate concrete to form a decagonal dome. The material of choice in construction gradually transitioned during the 4th and 5th centuries from stone or concrete to lighter brick in thin shells. The use of ribs stiffened the structure, allowing domes to be thinner with less massive supporting walls. Windows were often used in these walls and replaced the oculus as a source of light, although buttressing was sometimes necessary to compensate for large openings. The Mausoleum of Santa Costanza has windows beneath the dome and nothing but paired columns beneath that, using a surrounding barrel vault to buttress the structure.

The octagonal "Domus Aurea", or "Golden Octagon", built by Emperor Constantine in 327 at the imperial palace of Antioch likewise had a domical roof, presumably of wood and covered with gilded lead.

Centralized buildings of circular or octagonal plan also became used for baptistries and reliquaries due to the suitability of those shapes for assembly around a single object. Baptisteries began to be built in the manner of domed mausolea during the 4th century in Italy. The octagonal Lateran Baptistery or the baptistery of the Holy Sepulchre may have been the first, and the style spread during the 5th century. In the second half of the fourth century, domed octagonal baptisteries similar to the form of contemporary imperial mausolea developed in the region of North Italy near Milan.

Between the second half of the 4th century and the middle of the 5th century, domed mausolea for wealthy families were built attached to a new type of martyrial basilica before burials within the basilica itself, closer to the martyr's remains, made such attached buildings obsolete.

Christian mausolea and shrines developed into the "centralized church" type, often with a dome over a raised central space. The Church of the Holy Sepulchre in Jerusalem was likely built with a wooden dome over the shrine by the end of the 4th century. It may have had a stone dome.

Fluted or coffered domed structures appear in art with greater frequency from the late 4th century.

=== Fifth century ===
The largest centrally planned Early Christian church, the Basilica of San Lorenzo Maggiore, was built in Milan while that city served as the capital of the Western Empire and may have been domed with a light material, such as timber or cane. Thermoluminescence and radiocarbon dating indicate construction began sometime between 390 and 410, using a significant proportion of recycled bricks.

By the 5th century, structures with small-scale domed cross plans existed across the Christian world. Examples include the Mausoleum of Galla Placidia, the martyrium attached to the Basilica of San Simpliciano, and churches in Macedonia and on the coast of Asia Minor. The square bay with an overhead sail vault or dome on pendentives became the basic unit of architecture in the early Byzantine centuries, found in a variety of combinations.

In the city of Rome, at least 58 domes in 44 buildings are known to have been built before domed construction ended in the middle of the 5th century. Although they continued to be built elsewhere in Italy, domes would not be built again within Rome until 1453. The last imperial domed mausoleum in the city was that of Emperor Honorius, built in 415 next to St. Peter's Basilica. The last domed church in the city of Rome for centuries was Santo Stefano al Monte Celio around 460. It had an unusual centralized plan and a 22 meter wide dome made with vaulting tubes, a technique that may have been imported from the new western capital of Ravenna.

There were a half dozen tetraconch-plan buildings built in important cities from Syria to northern Mesopotamia in a 75 year period beginning around 460, with their 10-13 meter central space covered either by a pyramidal roof or a dome made of timber or another light material.

With the end of the Western Roman Empire, domes became a signature feature of the church architecture of the surviving Eastern Roman Empire. A transition from timber-roofed basilicas to vaulted churches seems to have occurred there between the late 5th century and the 7th century, with early examples in Constantinople, Asia Minor, and Cilicia. The first known domed basilica may have been a church at Meriamlik in southern Turkey, dated to between 471 and 494, although the ruins do not provide a definitive answer. It is possible earlier examples existed in Constantinople, where it has been suggested that the plan for the Meriamlik church itself was designed, but no domed basilica has been found there before the 6th century.

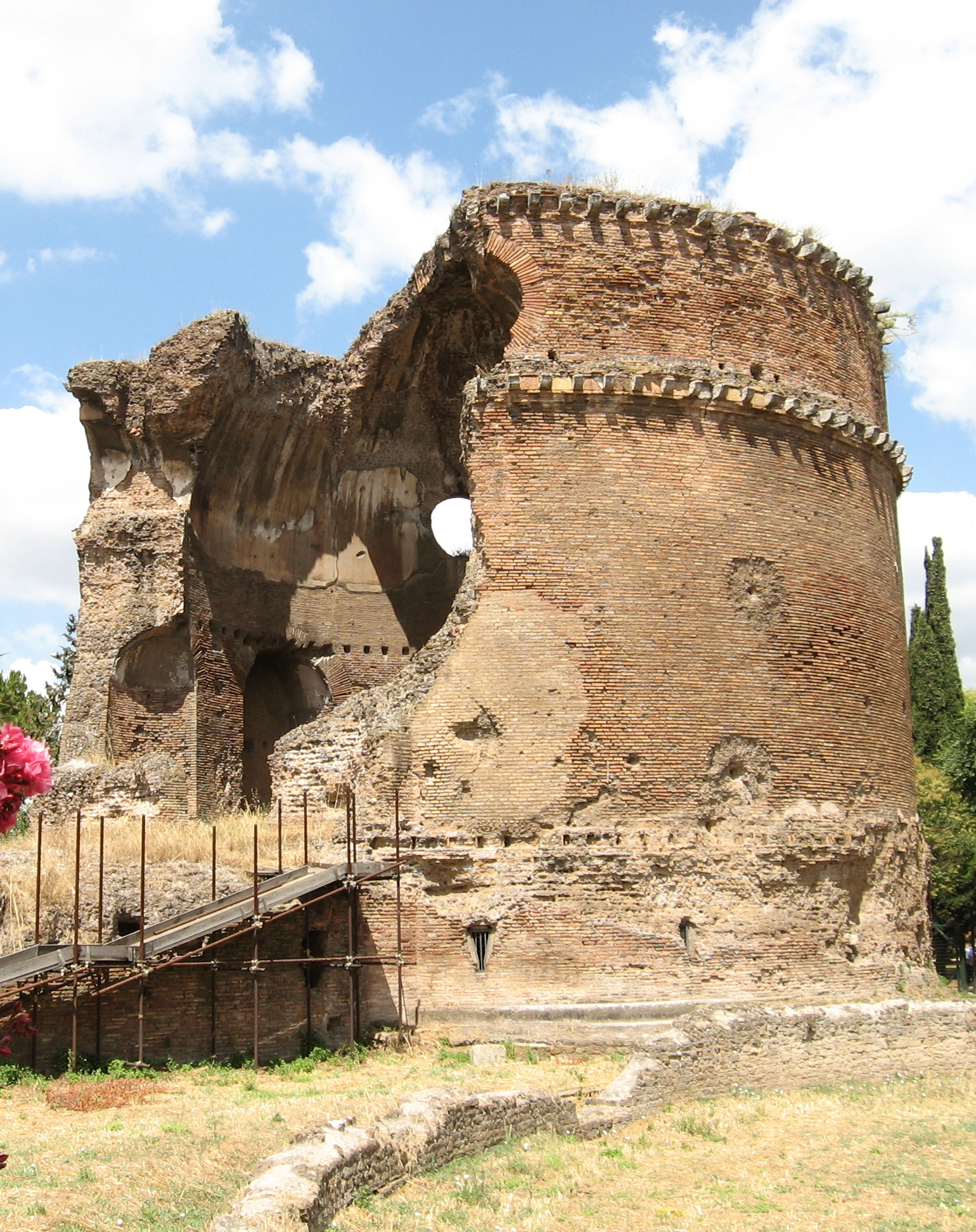
Ruins at Villa Gordiani

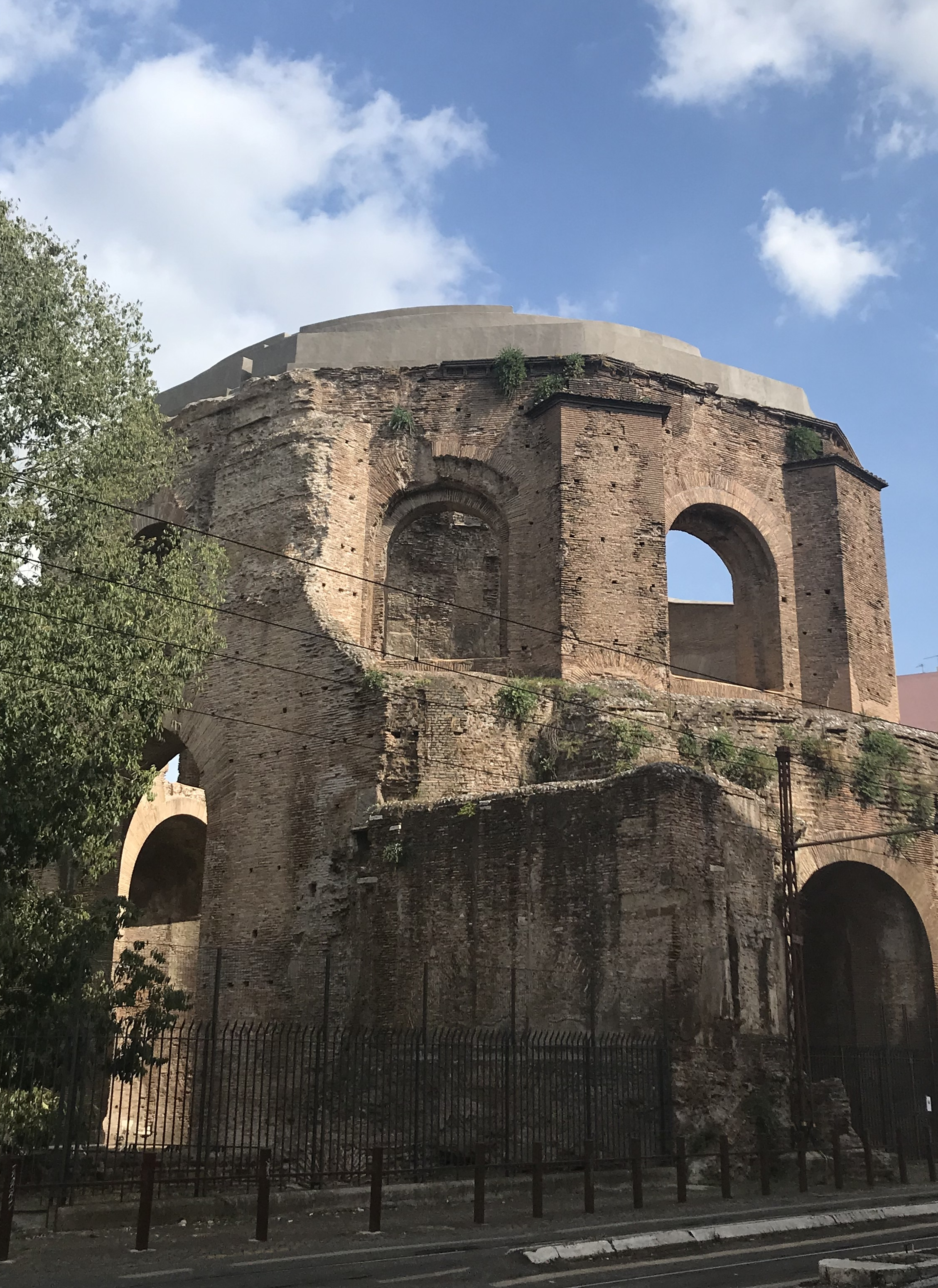
The so-called "Temple of Minerva Medica" in Rome

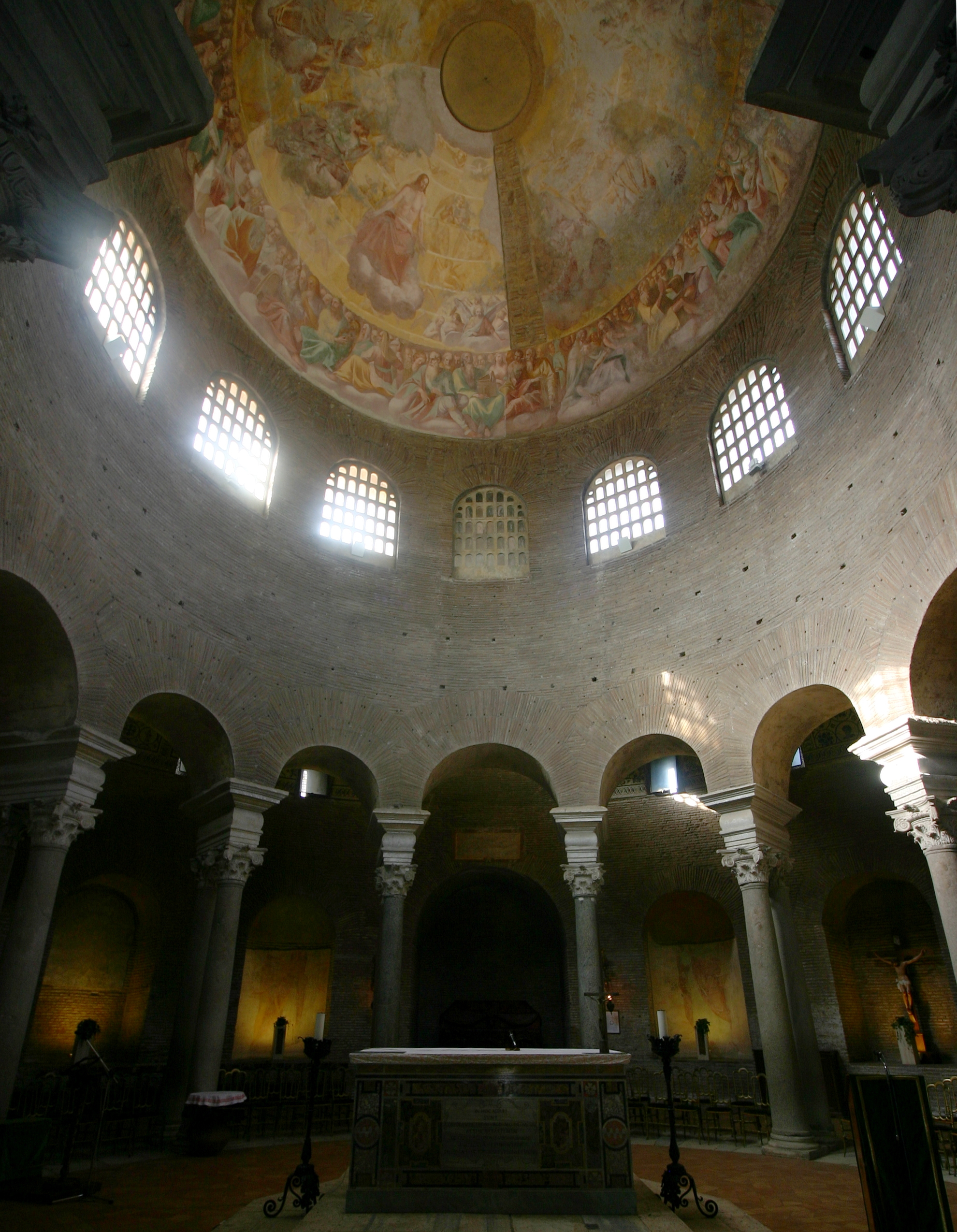
The Mausoleum of Santa Costanza

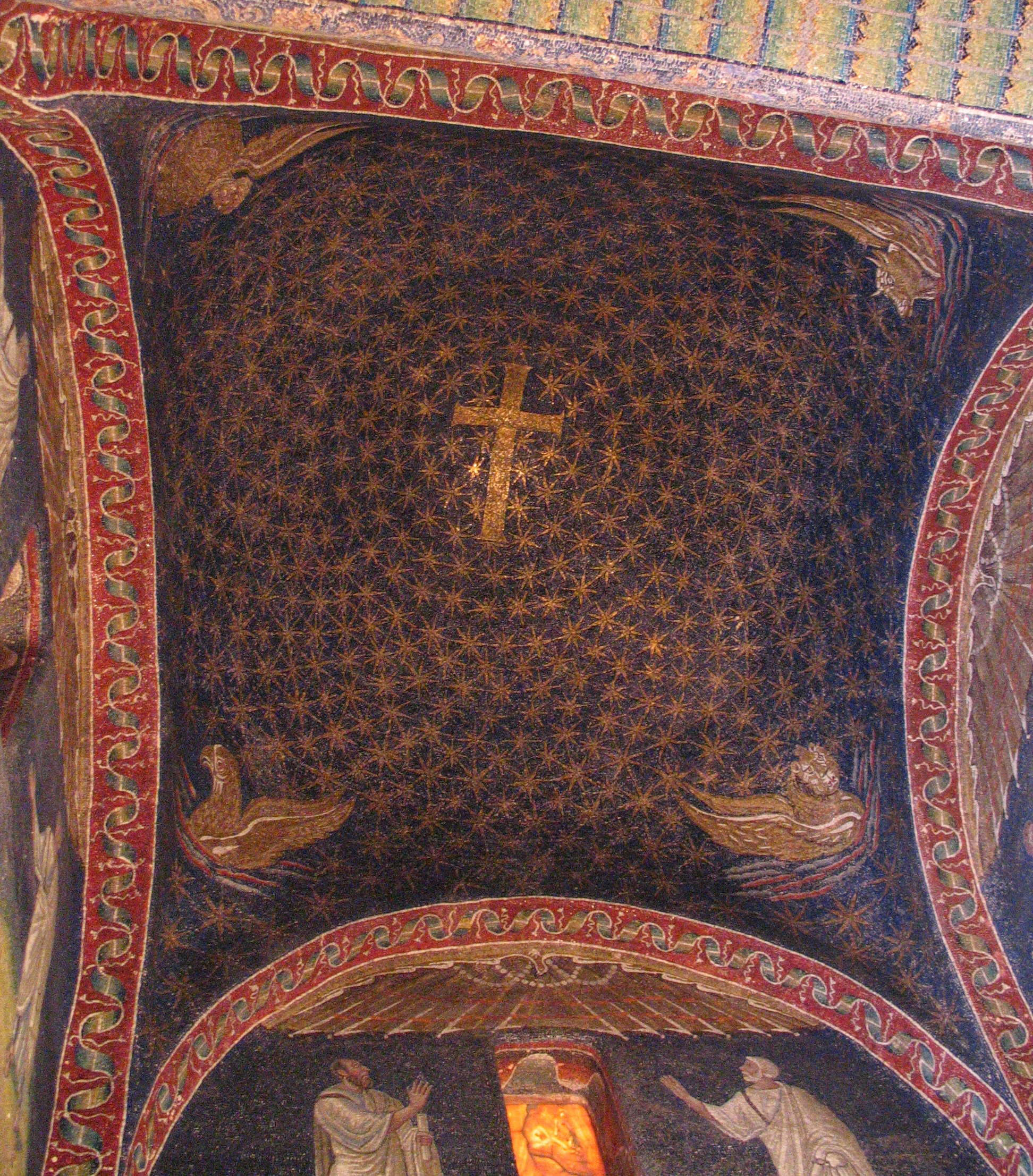
The Mausoleum of Galla Placidia in Ravenna

=== Sixth century ===
The 6th century marks a turning point for domed church architecture. Centrally planned domed churches had been built since the 4th century for very particular functions, such as palace churches or martyria, with a slight widening of use around 500 AD, but most church buildings were timber-roofed halls on the basilica plan.

Under Justin I in the 520s, Justinian seems to have razed the Basilica of St. John in Ephesus and replaced it with a Greek cross cruciform building with five domes similar to his later Church of the Holy Apostles in Constantinople.

In the second third of the 6th century, church building by the Emperor Justinian used the domed cross unit on a monumental scale, in keeping with Justinian's emphasis on bold architectural innovation. His church architecture emphasized the central dome and his architects made the domed brick-vaulted central plan standard throughout the Roman east. This divergence with the Roman west from the second third of the 6th century may be considered the beginning of a "Byzantine" architecture. Timber-roofed basilicas, which had previously been the standard church form, would continue to be so in the medieval west. The earliest existing of Justinian's domed buildings may be the central plan Church of Saints Sergius and Bacchus in Constantinople, completed by 536.

After the Nika Revolt destroyed much of the city of Constantinople in 532, including the churches of Hagia Sophia ("Holy Wisdom") and Hagia Irene ("Holy Peace"), Justinian had the opportunity to rebuild. Both had been basilica plan churches and both were rebuilt as domed basilicas, although the Hagia Sophia was rebuilt on a much grander scale. Built by Anthemius of Tralles and Isidore of Miletus in Constantinople between 532 and 537, the Hagia Sophia's original central dome completed in 537 was significantly different from the current one and, according to contemporary accounts, much bolder. This first dome partially collapsed in 558 due to an earthquake and the design was then revised to the present profile.

An octagonal building in Ravenna, begun under Theodoric in 525, was completed under the Byzantines in 547 as the Basilica of San Vitale and contains a terracotta dome. It may belong to a school of architecture from 4th and 5th century Milan. The building is similar to the Byzantine Church of Saints Sergius and Bacchus and the later Chrysotriklinos, or throne hall and palace church of Constantinople, and it would be used as the model for Charlemagne's palace chapel at Aix-la-Chapelle.

In Constantinople, Justinian also tore down the aging Church of the Holy Apostles and rebuilt it on a grander scale between 536 and 550. The original building was a cruciform basilica with a central domed mausoleum. Justinian's replacement was apparently likewise cruciform but with a central dome and four flanking domes.

Italian church architecture from the late sixth century to the end of the eighth century was influenced less by the trends of Constantinople than by a variety of Byzantine provincial plans.

=== Seventh century ===
The period of Iconoclasm, roughly corresponding to the 7th to 9th centuries, is poorly documented but can be considered a transitional period. The cathedral of Sofia has an unsettled date of construction, ranging from the last years of Justinian to the middle of the 7th century, as the Balkans were lost to the Slavs and Bulgars. It combines a barrel-vaulted cruciform basilica plan with a crossing dome hidden externally by the drum. It resembles some Romanesque churches of later centuries, although the type would not be popular in later Byzantine architecture.

Destruction by earthquakes or invaders in the seventh to ninth centuries seems to have encouraged the development of masonry domes and vaulting experimentation over basilicas in Anatolia. The Sivrihisar Kizil Kilise has a dome over an octagonal drum with windows on a square platform and was built around 600, before the battles in the region in the 640s. The domed Church of Mary in Ephesus may have been built in the late sixth or first half of the seventh century with reused bricks. The smaller Church of the Dormition of the Monastery of Hyacinth in Nicaea had a dome supported on four narrow arches and dated prior to 727. The lobed dome of the Church of St. Clement at Ancyra was supported by pendentives that also included squinch-like arches, a possible indication of unfamiliarity with pendentives by the builders. The upper portion of the Church of St. Nicholas at Myra was destroyed, but it had a dome on pendentives over the nave that might have been built between 602 and 655, although it has been attributed to the late eighth or early ninth centuries. The dome over the Dormition church in Nicaea was damaged by an earthquake in 1063 and had to be rebuilt.

=== Eighth century ===
With the decline in the empire's resources following losses in population and territory, domes in Byzantine architecture were used as part of more modest new buildings. The large-scale churches of Byzantium were, however, kept in good repair. The upper portion of the Church of Hagia Irene was thoroughly rebuilt after the 740 Constantinople earthquake. The nave was re-covered with an elliptical domical vault hidden externally by a low cylinder on the roof, in place of the earlier barrel vaulted ceiling, and the original central dome from the Justinian era was replaced with one raised upon a high windowed drum. The barrel vaults supporting these two new domes were also extended out over the side aisles, creating cross-domed units. By bracing the dome with broad arches on all four sides, the cross-domed unit provided a more secure structural system. These units, with most domes raised on drums, became a standard element on a smaller scale in later Byzantine church architecture, and all domes built after the transitional period were braced with bilateral symmetry.

A small, unisex monastic community in Bithynia, near Constantinople, may have developed the cross-in-square plan church during the Iconoclastic period, which would explain the plan's small scale and unified naos. The ruined church of St. John at Pelekete Monastery is an early example. Monks had supported the use of icons, unlike the government-appointed secular clergy, and monasticism would become increasingly popular. A new type of privately funded urban monastery developed from the 9th century on, which may help to explain the small size of subsequent building.

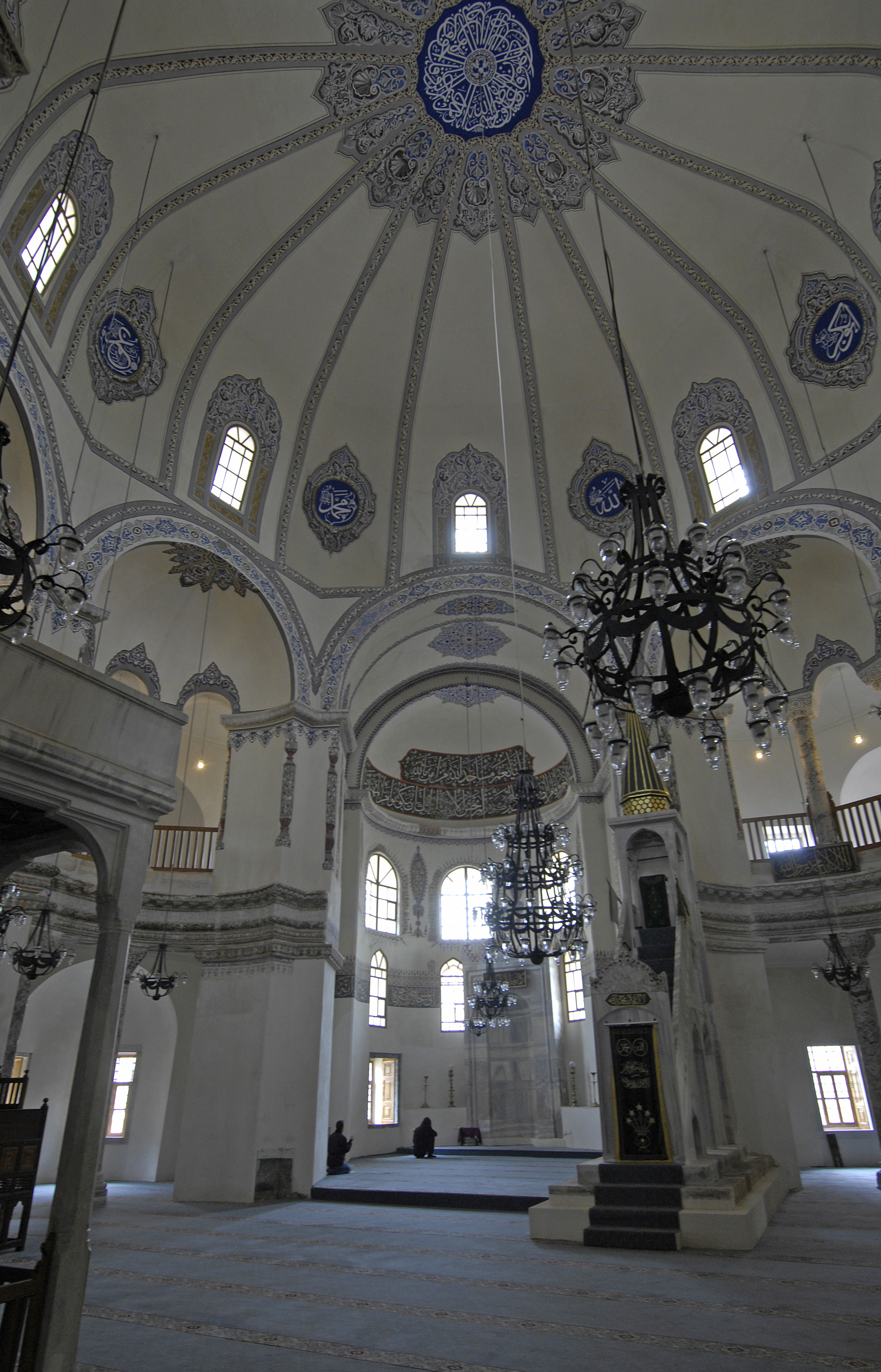
Little Hagia Sophia Mosque, formerly Church of Saints Sergius and Bacchus in Istanbul

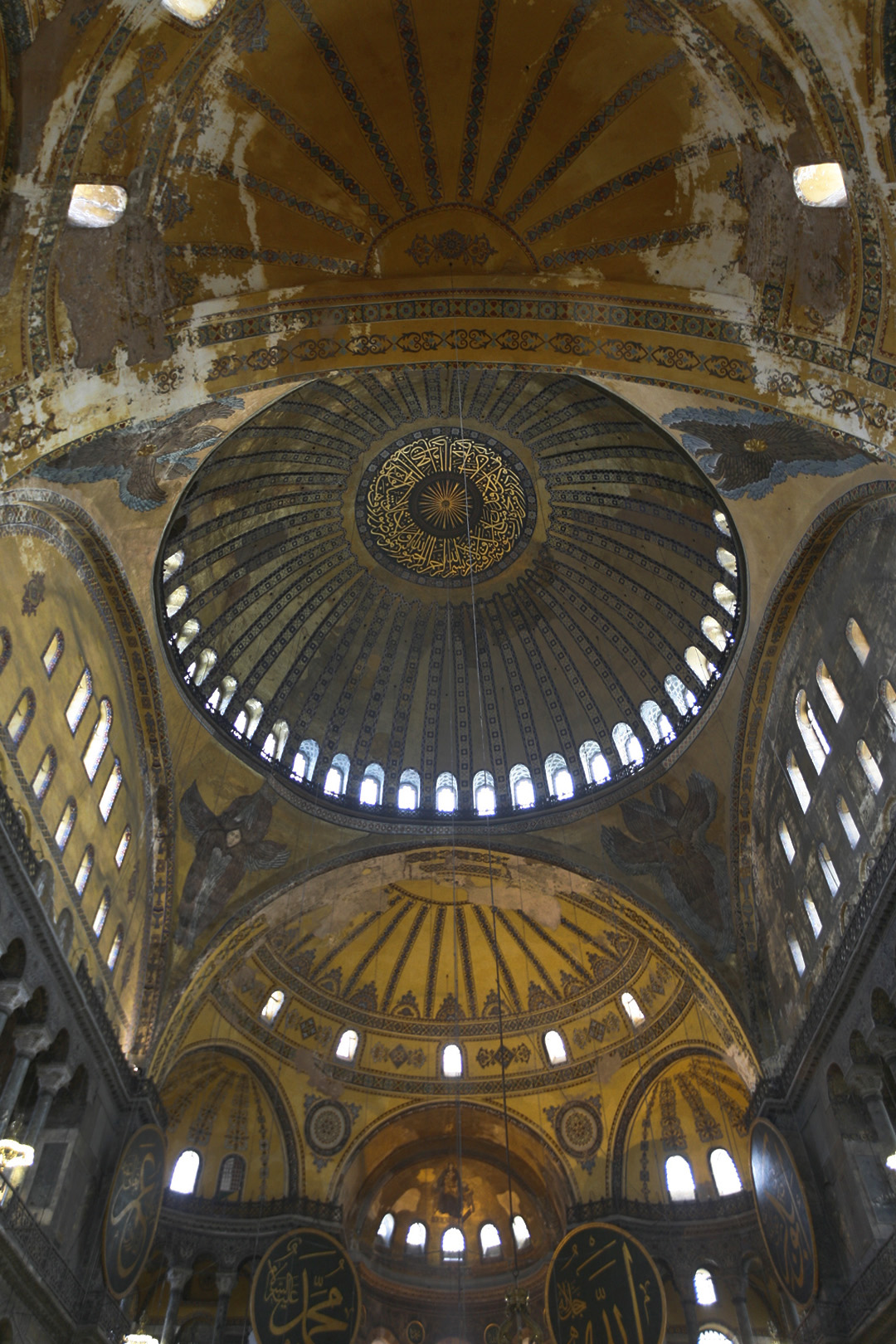
The Hagia Sophia in Istanbul

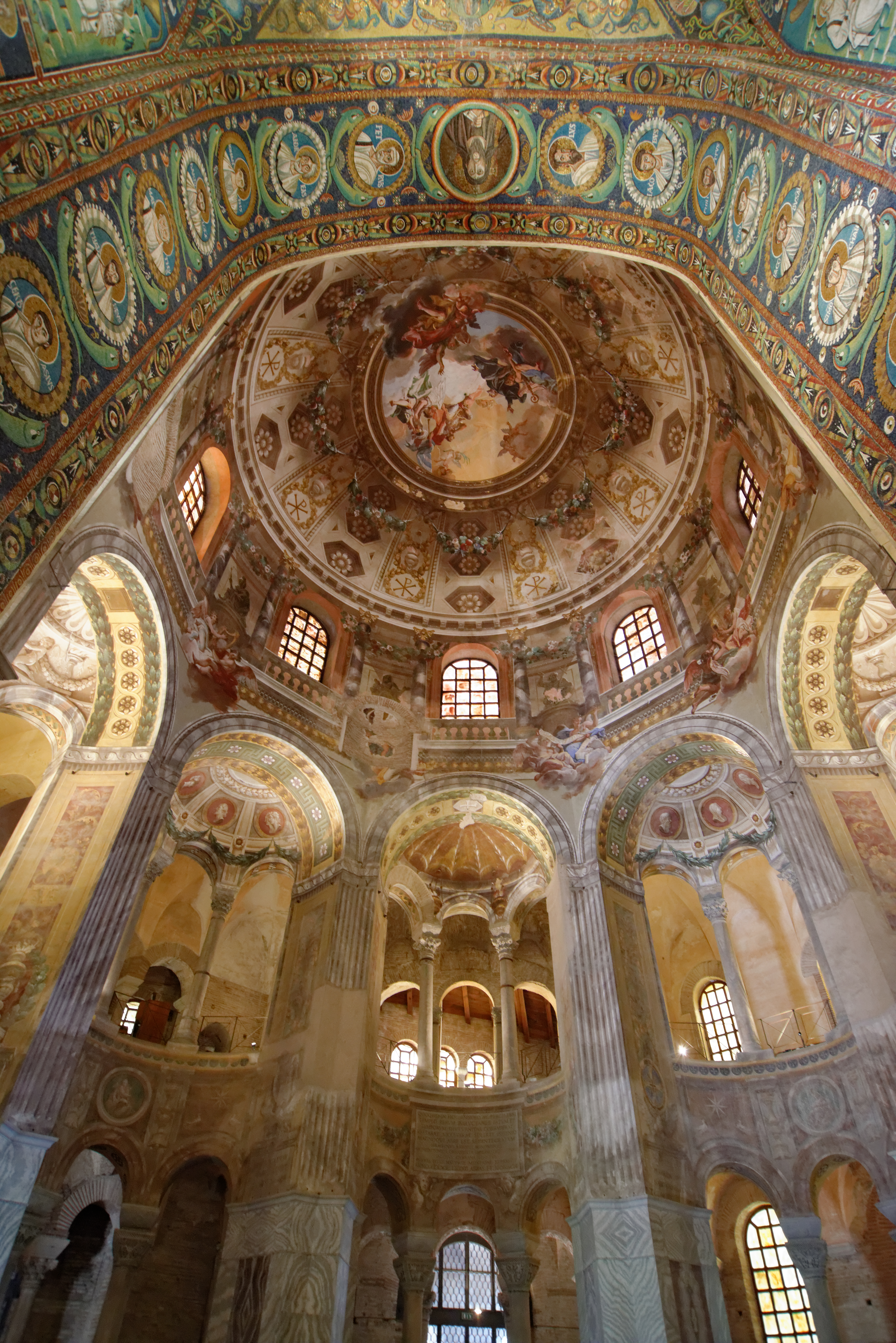
The Basilica of San Vitale in Ravenna

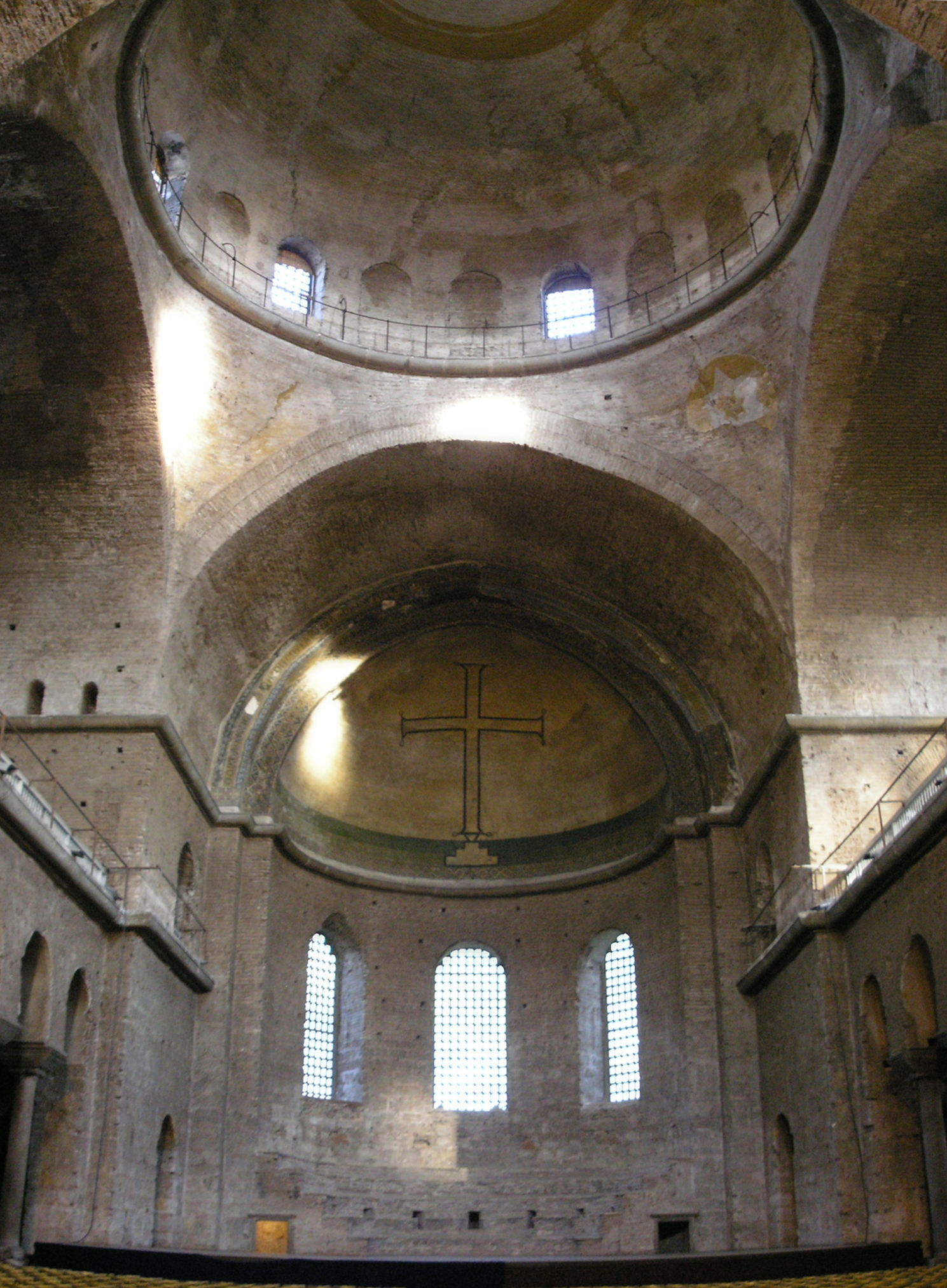
The Hagia Irene in Istanbul

=== Ninth century ===
Timber-roofed basilicas, which had been the standard form until the 6th century, would be displaced by domed churches from the 9th century onward. In the Middle Byzantine period (c. 843 – 1204), domes were normally built to emphasize separate functional spaces, rather than as the modular ceiling units they had been earlier. Resting domes on circular or polygonal drums pierced with windows eventually became the standard style, with regional characteristics.

The cross-in-square plan, with a single dome at the crossing or five domes in a quincunx pattern, became widely popular in the Middle Byzantine period. A number of sub-types emerged over the centuries that have been variously classified by floor plan and dome support system.

The Nea Ekklesia of Emperor Basil I was built in Constantinople around 880 as part of a substantial building renovation and construction program during his reign. It had five domes, which are known from literary sources, but different arrangements for them have been proposed under at least four different plans.

=== Tenth century ===
The cross-in-square is the most common church plan from the 10th century until the fall of Constantinople in 1453. This type of plan, with four columns supporting the dome at the crossing, was best suited for domes less than 7 meters (23 ft) wide and, from the 10th to the 14th centuries, a typical Byzantine dome measured less than 6 meters (20 ft) in diameter. For domes beyond that width, variations in the plan were required such as using piers in place of the columns and incorporating further buttressing around the core of the building. The distinctive rippling eaves design for the roofs of domes began in the 10th century. In mainland Greece, circular or octagonal drums became the most common.

The earliest cross-in-square in Greece is the Panagia church at the monastery of Hosios Loukas, dated to the late 10th century, but variations of the type can be found from southern Italy to Russia and Anatolia. They served in a wide variety of church roles, including domestic, parish, monastic, palatial, and funerary.

That southern Italy was reconquered and ruled by a Byzantine governor from about 970 to 1071 explains the relatively large number of small and rustic Middle Byzantine-style churches found there, including the Cattolica in Stilo and S. Marco in Rossano. Both are cross-in-square churches with five small domes on drums in a quincunx pattern and date either to the period of Byzantine rule or after.

=== Eleventh century ===
In Constantinople, drums with twelve or fourteen sides were popular beginning in the 11th century. Middle Byzantine architecture in Constantinople put particular emphasis on the design of the dome and apse, beginning in the 11th century.

The 11th century rock-cut churches of Cappadocia, such as Karanlik Kilise and Elmali Kilise in Göreme, have shallow domes without drums due to the dim natural lighting of cave interiors. The rock-cut architecture is characterized by an exaggeration of forms and a multiplication of domes.

The domed-octagon plan is a variant of the cross-in-square plan. The earliest extant example is the katholikon at the monastery of Hosios Loukas, with a 9-meter (30 ft) wide dome built in the first half of the 11th century. The domed octagon church of Nea Moni was reported in a synaxarium of its two founders to have been based on a "small church of the Holy Apostles" in Constantinople, about which little is known.

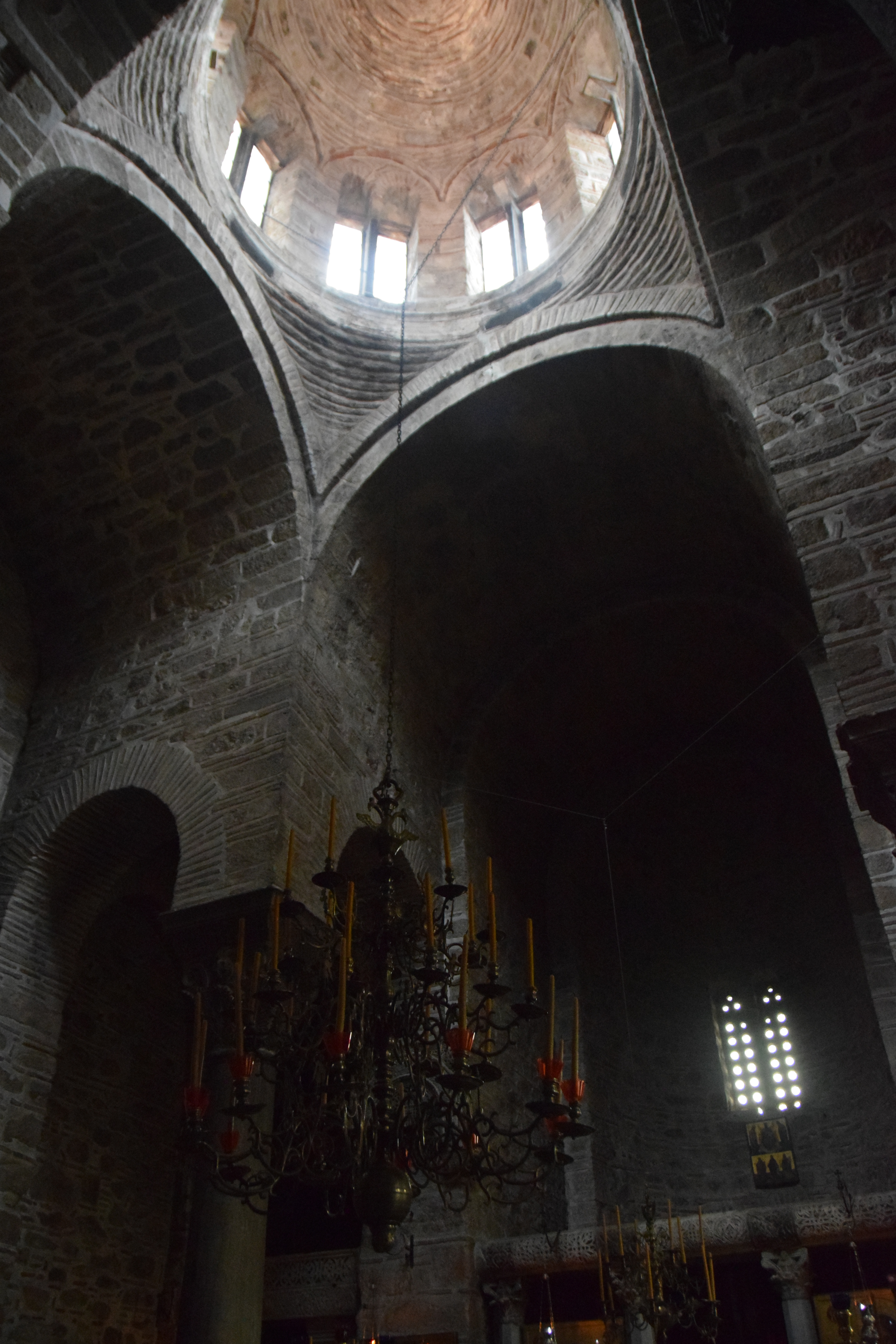
The Hosios Loukas Panagia church near Distomo, Greece

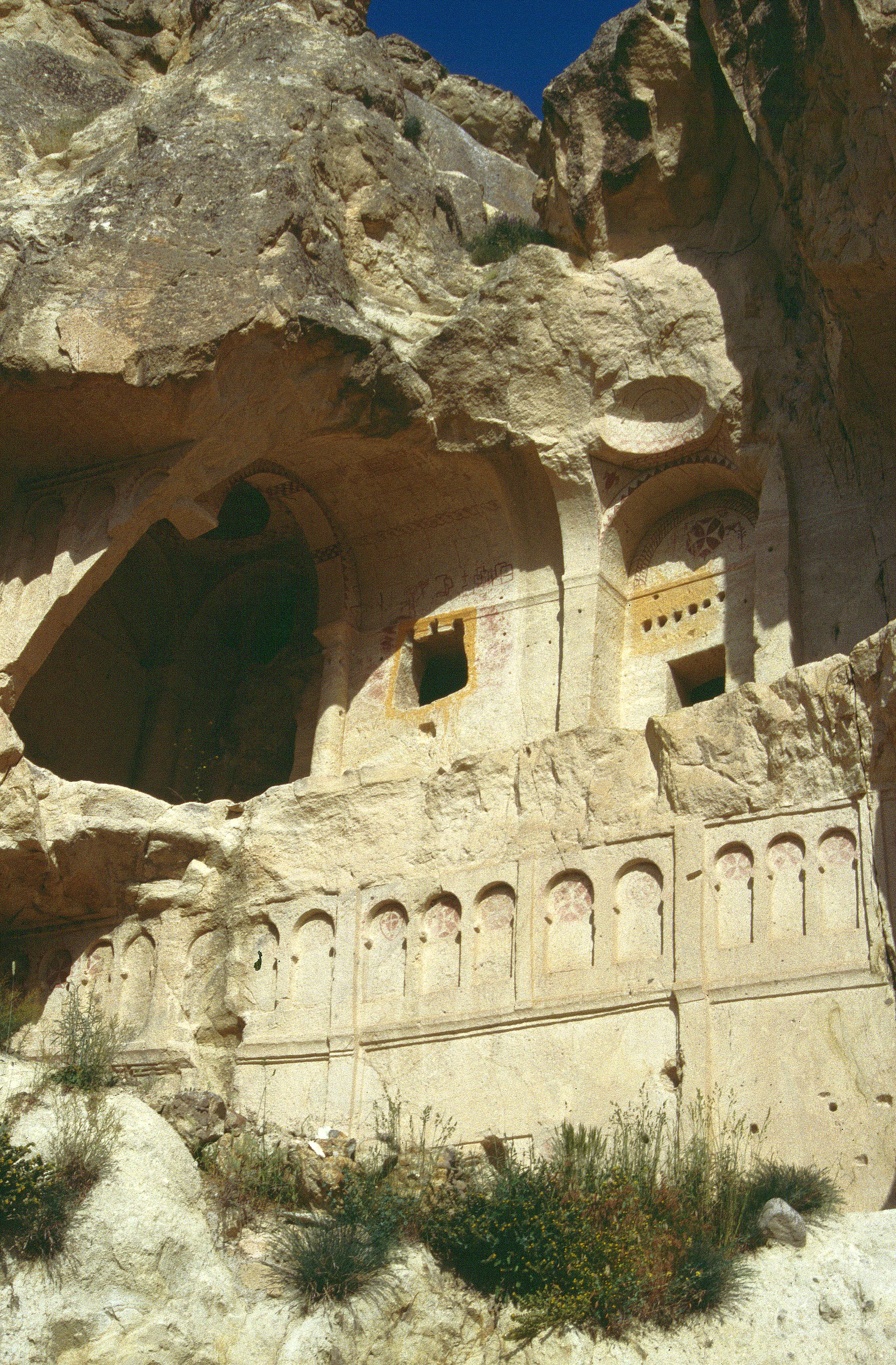
Karanlık Kilise ruins in Göreme, Turkey

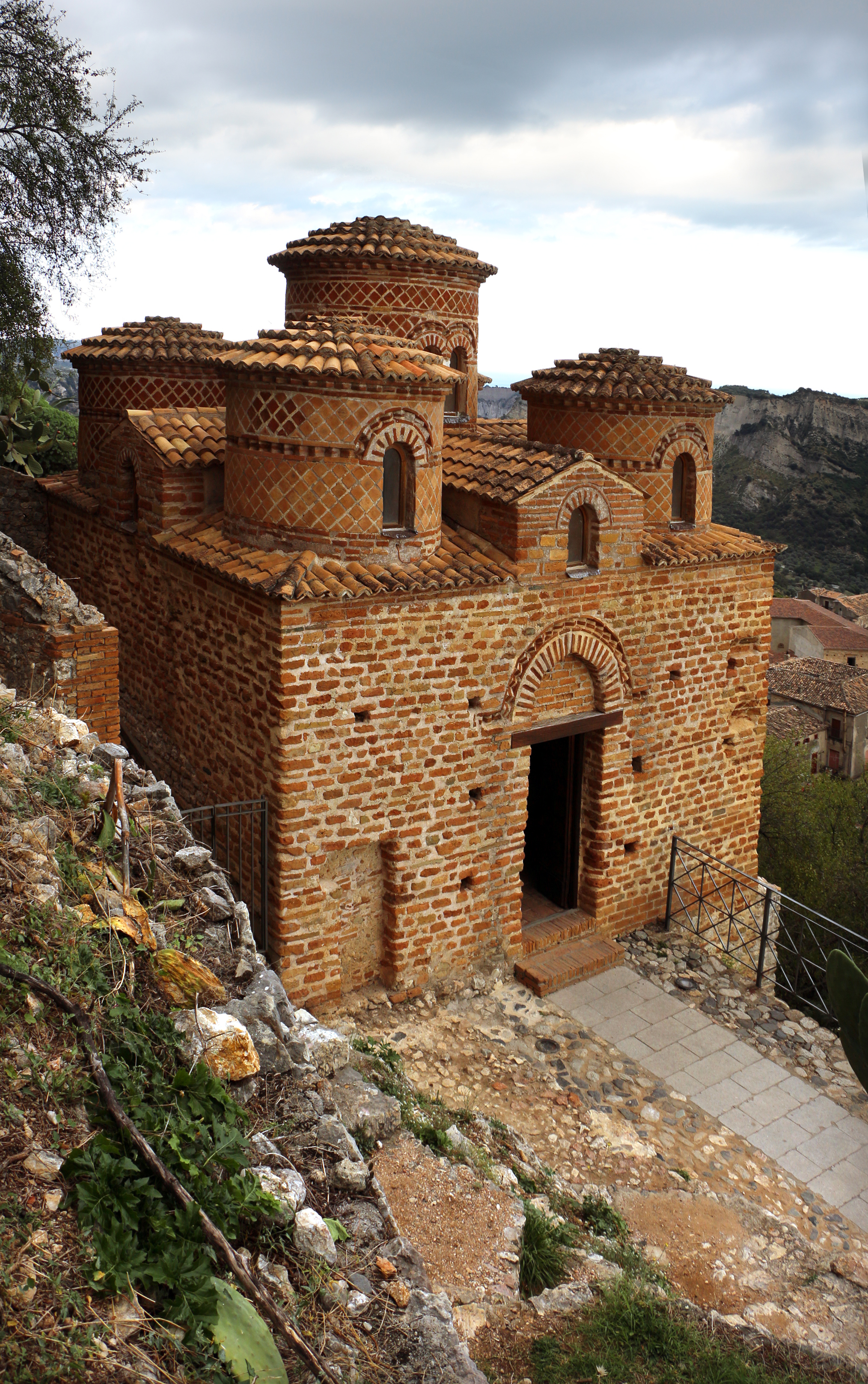
Cattolica di Stilo in Stilo, Italy

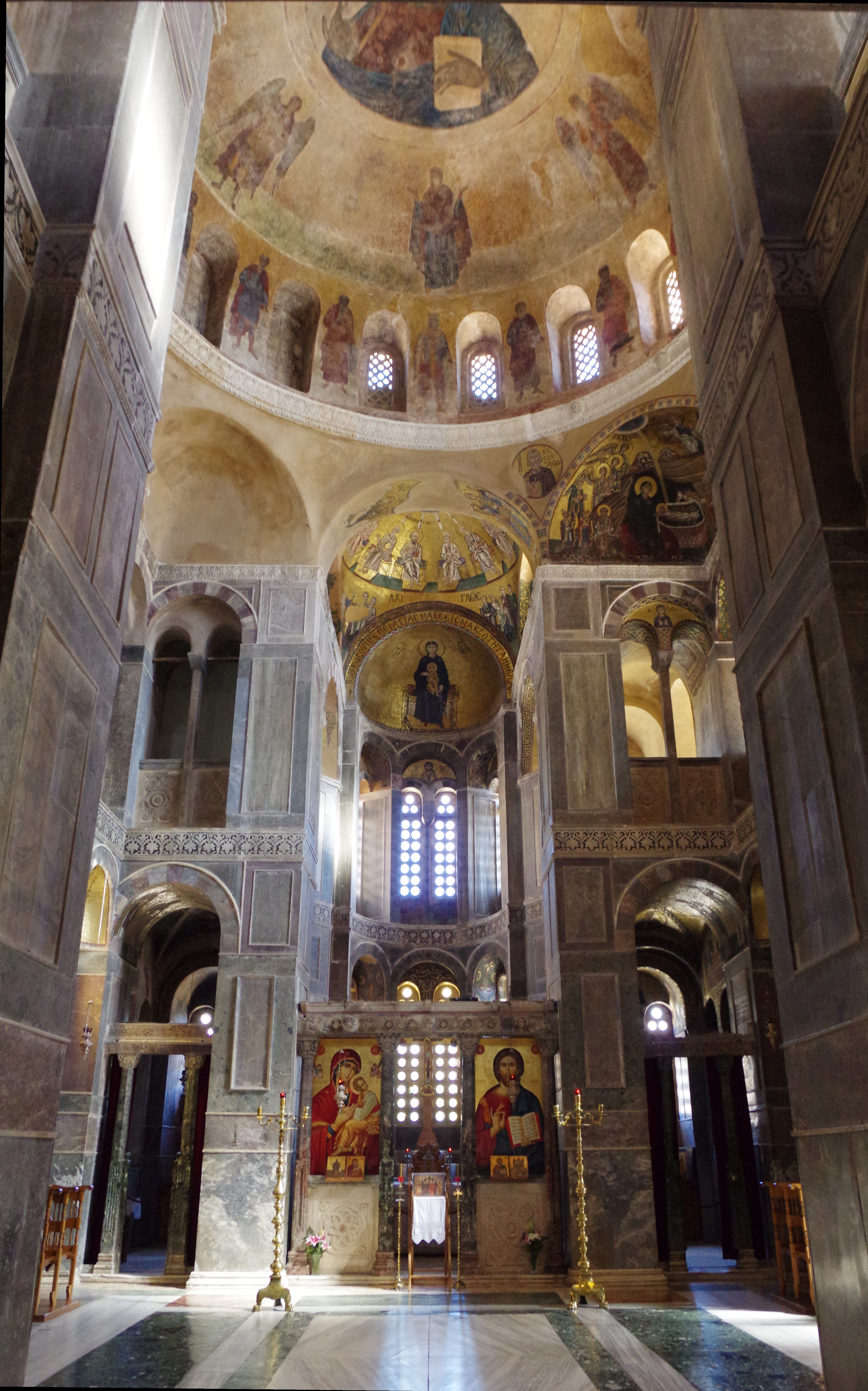
The katholikon of the monastery of Hosios Loukas near Distomo, Greece

=== Twelfth century ===
The larger scale of some Byzantine buildings of the 12th century required a more stable support structure for domes than the four slender columns of the cross-in-square type could provide. The Byzantine churches today called Kalenderhane Mosque, Gül Mosque, and the Enez Fatih mosque all had domes greater than 7 meters (23 ft) in diameter and used piers as part of large cruciform plans, a practice that had been out of fashion for several centuries. A variant of the cross-in-square, the "so-called atrophied Greek cross plan", also provides greater support for a dome than the typical cross-in-square plan by using four piers projecting from the corners of an otherwise square naos, rather than four columns. This design was used in the Chora Church of Constantinople in the 12th century after the previous cross-in-square structure was destroyed by an earthquake.

=== Thirteenth century ===
The Late Byzantine Period, from 1204 to 1453, has an unsettled chronology of buildings, especially during the Latin Occupation. The fragmentation of the empire, beginning in 1204, is reflected in a fragmentation of church design and regional innovations.

In the Despotate of Epirus, the church of St. Nicholas in Mesopotam (first third of the 13th century) was built with two identical naoi and two apses, like the earlier church of Üçayak. Although it has been called "the finest expression of the regional Epirote architectural paradigm", it has been remodeled over the centuries and is covered by four domes, two over each naos. The two spaces may have been to allow relic visitation by pilgrims to be kept separate from normal liturgical functions.

The church of Hagia Sophia in the Empire of Trebizond dates to between 1238 and 1263 and has a variation on the quincunx plan. Heavy with traditional detailing from Asia Minor, and possibly Armenian or Georgian influence, the brick pendentives and drum of the dome remain Byzantine.

After 1261, new church architecture in Constantinople consisted mainly of additions to existing monastic churches, such as the Monastery of Lips and Pammakaristos Church, and as a result the building complexes are distinguished in part by an asymmetric array of domes on their roofs. This effect may have been in imitation of the earlier triple-church Pantokrator monastic complex.

In the Despotate of Epirus, the Church of the Parigoritissa (1282–9) is the most complex example, with a domed octagon core and domed ambulatory.

=== Fourteenth and fifteenth centuries ===
Churches with domed narthexes include the Holy Trinity in Berat (late 13th to early 14th century), the Church of St. Demetrius in Kypseli (probably after 1306), and the church of St. George in Omorphoklisia (c. 1295–1317). The large domed narthex of Porta Panagia, similar to that of Zoodochos Pigi, was added to a church dated to 1283.

Mistra was ruled from Constantinople after 1262, then was the suzerain of the Despotate of the Morea from 1348 to 1460. In Mistra, there are several basilica plan churches with domed galleries that create a five-domed cross-in-square over a ground-level basilica plan. The Aphentiko at Brontochion Monastery was built c. 1310–22 and the later church of the Pantanassa Monastery (1428) is of the same type. Both churches have domes over their western galleries, suggesting a role for those galleries in appearances by members of the local court. The Aphentiko may have been originally planned as a cross-in-square church, but has a blend of longitudinal and central plan components, with an interior divided into nave and aisles like a basilica. The barrel-vaulted nave and cross arms have a dome at their crossing, and the corner bays of the galleries are also domed to form a quincunx pattern. A remodeling of the Metropolis church in Mistra created an additional example. The Pantanassa incorporates Western elements in that domes in its colonnaded porch are hidden externally, and its domes have ribs of rectangular section similar to those of Salerno, Ravello, and Palermo. The fresco of the dome of Peribleptos Monastery is from about 1370 and features a small Pantokrator image.

In Thessaloniki, a distinctive type of church dome developed in the first two decades of the 14th century. It is characterized by a polygonal drum with rounded colonnettes at the corners, all brick construction, and faces featuring three arches stepped back within one another around a narrow "single-light window". One of the hallmarks of Thessalonian churches was the plan of a domed naos with a peristoon wrapped around three sides. The churches of Hagios Panteleimon, Hagia Aikaterine, and Hagioi Apostoloi have domes on these ambulatory porticoes. The five domes of the Hagioi Apostoloi, or Church of the Holy Apostles, in Thessaloniki (c. 1329) makes it an example of a five-domed cross-in-square church in the Late Byzantine style.

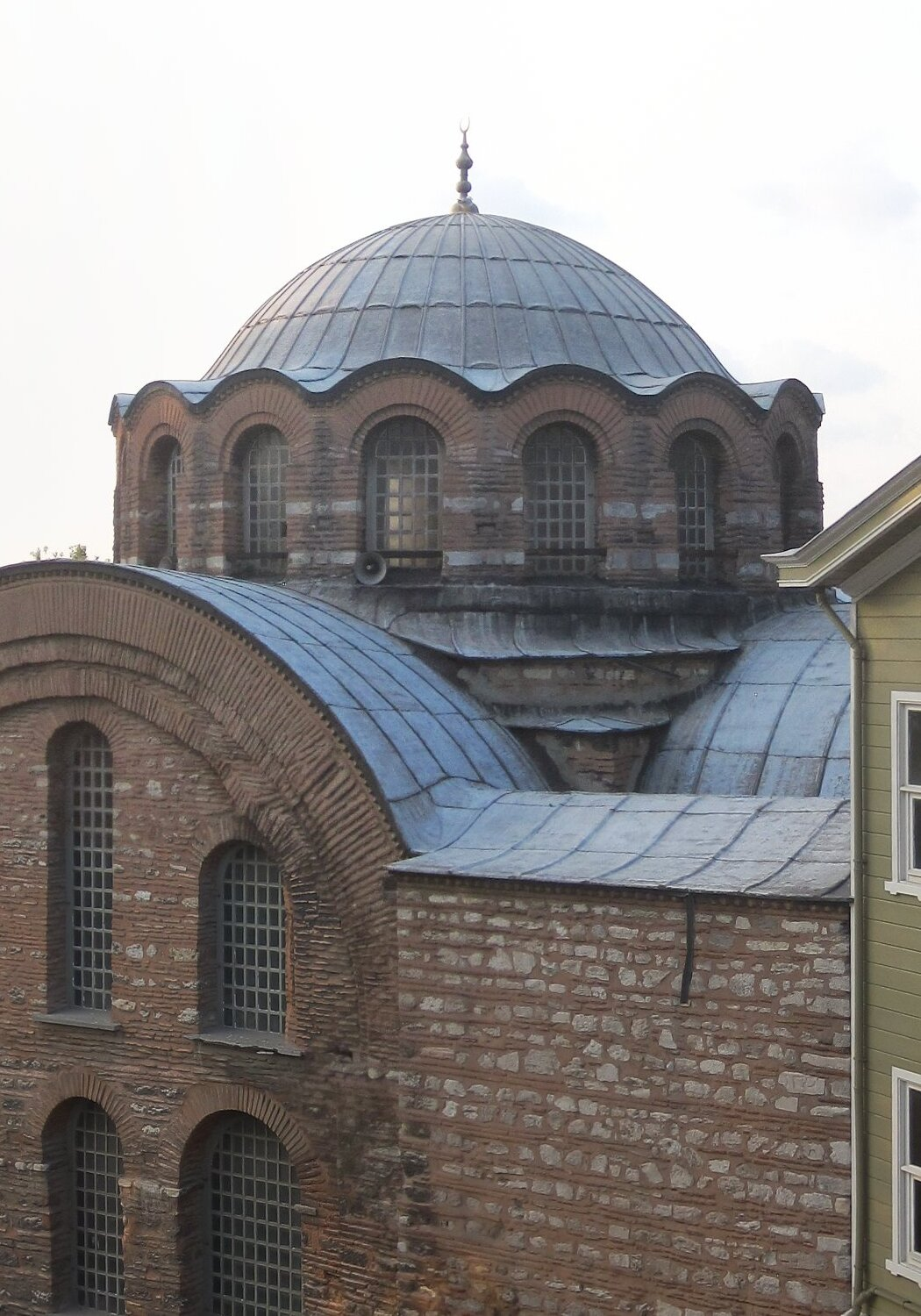
Kalenderhane Mosque in Istanbul

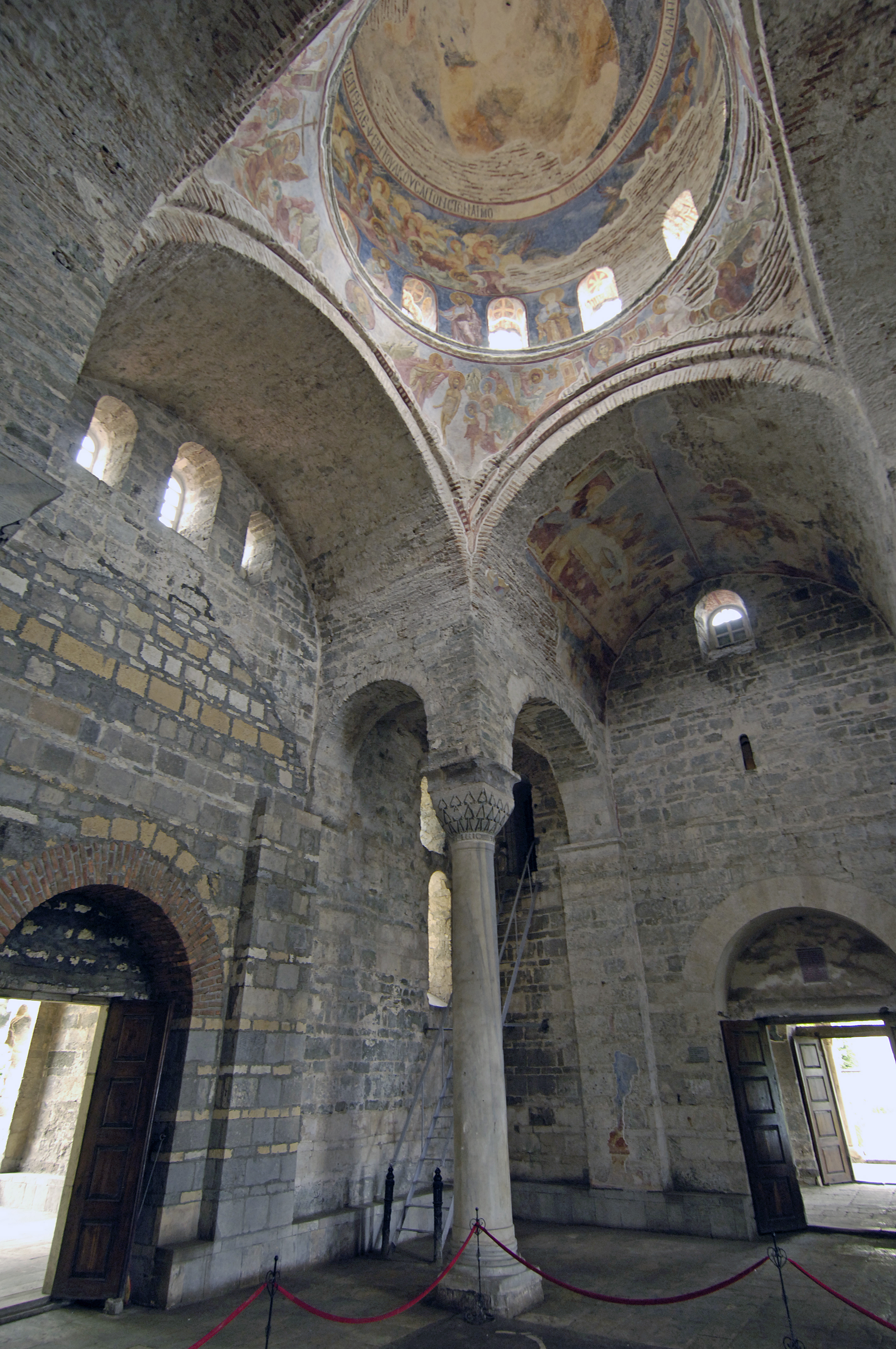
The church of Hagia Sophia in Trabzon, Turkey

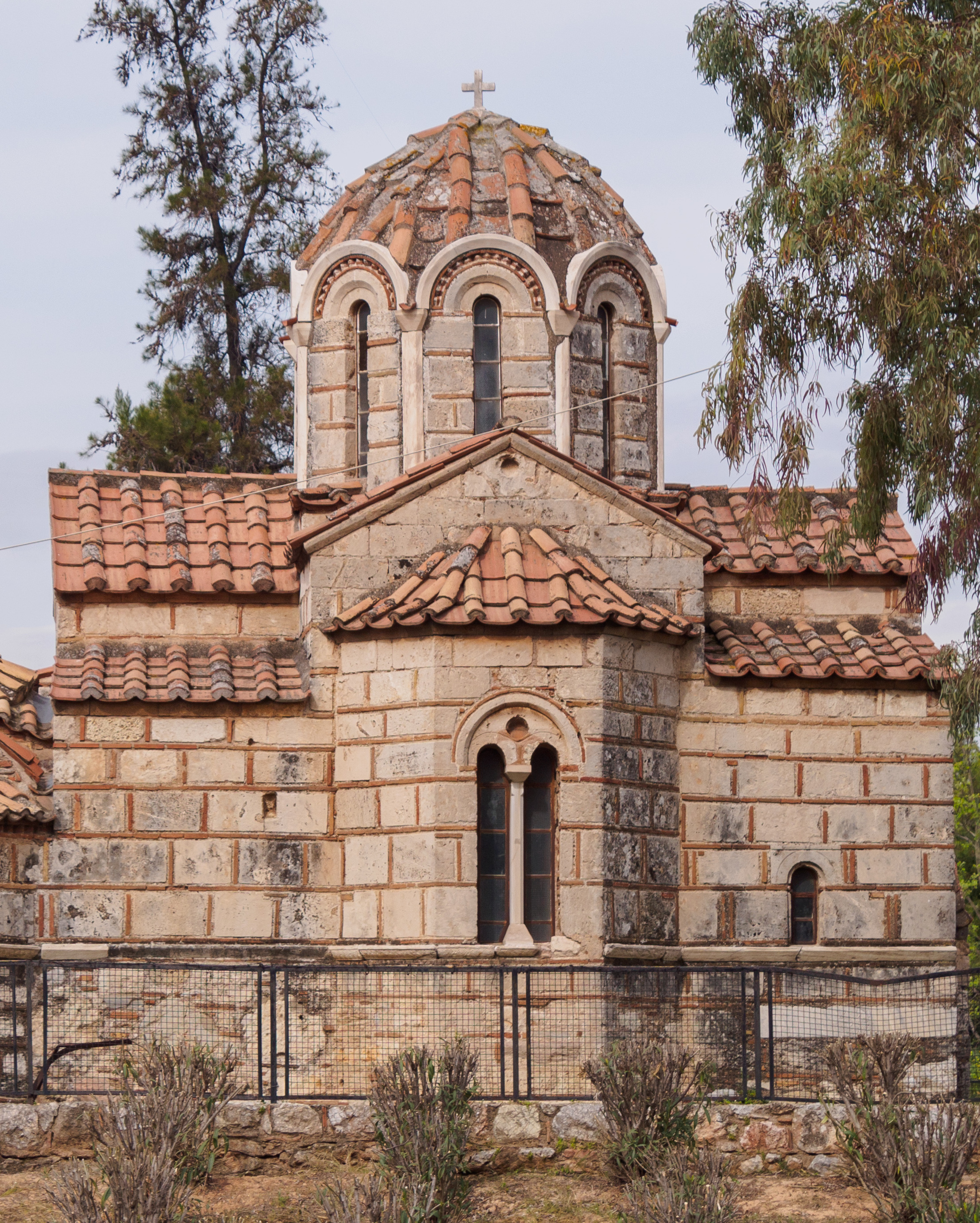
The church of St. George in Omorphoklisia

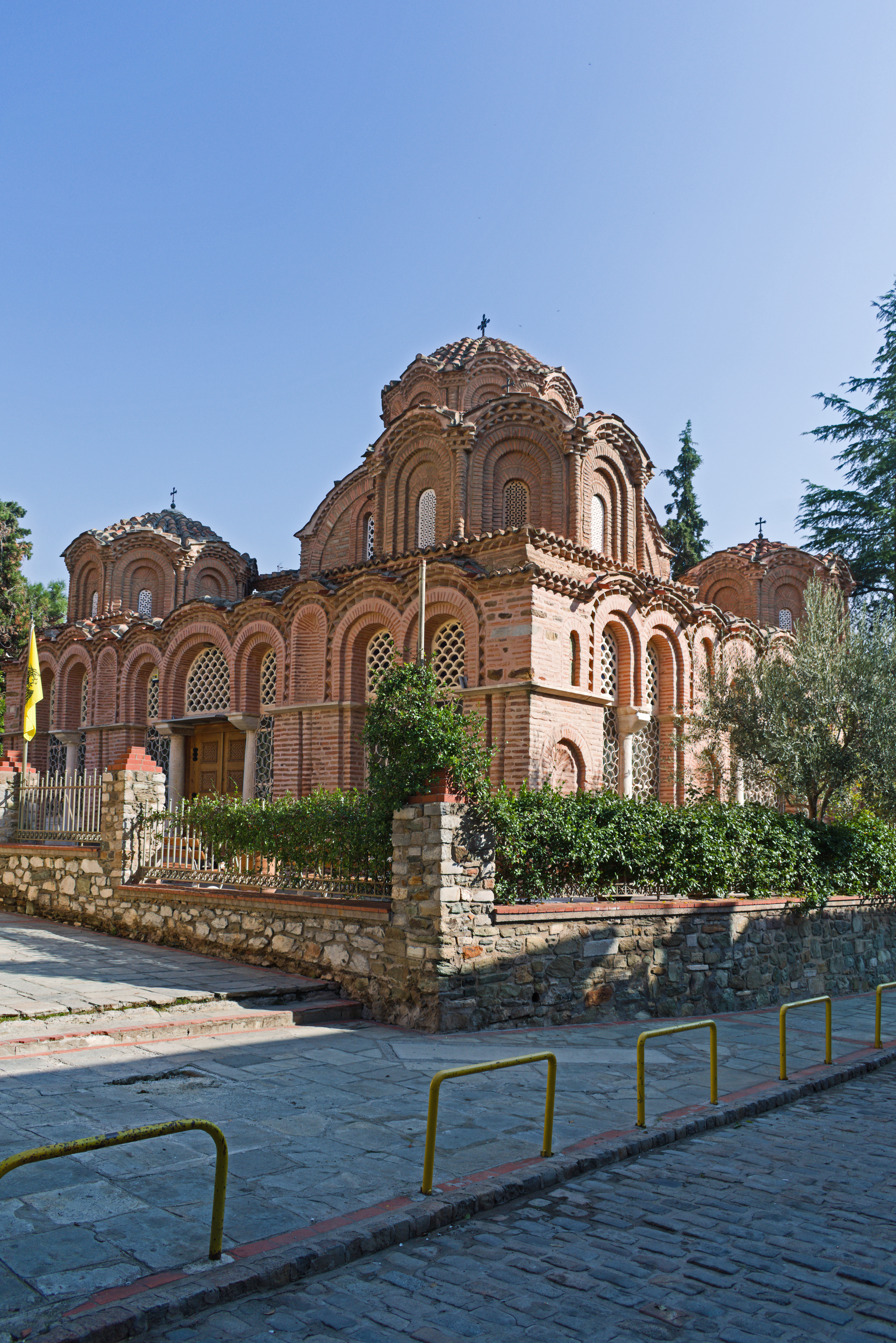
The church of Hagia Aikaterine in Thessaloniki, Greece

== Influence ==
=== Armenia ===
Constantinople's cultural influence extended from Sicily to Russia. Armenia, as a border state between the Roman-Byzantine and Sasanian empires, was influenced by both. The exact relationship between Byzantine architecture and that of the Caucasus is unclear. Georgia and Armenia produced many central planned, domed buildings in the 7th century and, after a lull during the Arab invasions, the architecture flourished again in the Middle Byzantine Period.

Armenian church domes were initially wooden structures. Etchmiadzin Cathedral (c. 483) originally had a wooden dome covered by a wooden pyramidal roof before this was replaced with stone construction in 618. Churches with stone domes became the standard type after the 7th century, perhaps benefiting from a possible exodus of stonecutters from Syria, but the long traditions of wooden construction carried over stylistically. Some examples in stone as late as the 12th century are detailed imitations of clearly wooden prototypes.

Armenian church building was prolific in the late 6th and 7th centuries and, by the 7th century, the churches tend to be either central plans or combinations of central and longitudinal plans. Domes were supported by either squinches (which were used in the Sasanian Empire but rarely in the Byzantine) or pendentives like those of the Byzantine empire, and the combination of domed-cross plan with the hall-church plan could have been influenced by the architecture of Justinian. Domes and cross arms were added to the longitudinal cathedral of Dvin from 608 to 615 and a church in Tekor. Other domed examples include Ptghnavank in Ptghni (c. 600), a church in T'alinn (662-85), the Cathedral of Mren (629-40), and the Mastara Church (9th and 10th centuries).

An 11th-century Armenian source names an Armenian architect, Trdat, as responsible for the rebuilding of the dome of Hagia Sophia in Constantinople after the 989 earthquake caused a partial collapse of the central dome. Although squinches were the more common supporting system used to support Armenian domes, pendentives are always used beneath the domes attributed to Trdat, which include the 10th-century monasteries of Marmasen, Sanahin, and Helpat, as well as the patriarchal cathedral of Argina (c. 985), the Cathedral of Ani (989-1001), and the palace chapel of King Gagik II (c. 1001–1005).

=== Nubia ===
Medieval Nubian church architecture included typically-domed churches with four corner piers surrounded by an ambulacrum corridor, similar to examples from the late antique and early Christian periods. An example was built in Nuri. Some longitudinal churches with emphasized centers may have also included domes, although vaulted longitudinal churches were not normally domed. Nine-bayed hall-church types with a central dome, variants of the contemporary Byzantine cross-in-square type, were built beginning in the medieval period. They were similar to larger examples in Eqypt, most of which are now lost. Examples include the St. Raphael church in Tamit, the River Church of Kāw, the north church of Abdallāh Nirqī, and the west church of Fiğir ʿAntawū. The church at Kāw had a higher central dome on a rounded drum with windows supported by pendentives springing from squared piers of stone masonry. The surrounding bays were of equal heights and covered by mudbrick sail vaults.

A church at Qulb had the largest dome in Christian Nubia, over a 6.7 by 7.4 meter bay. It was supported by eight arches curved to create a circular base. Remains of a circular drum indicate it contained windows. The dome was likely "a rather highly pointed parabaloid shape". The building is similar to Byzantine octagonal domed churches at Daphni, Hosios Loukas, and the church of the Panagia Lycodemou in Athens. The domed churches of Anbā Hadrā monastery and Dayr al-Kubaniyya, in the Aswan region, and the Chalcedonian monastery of St. Arsenius near Tura are similar to Byzantine octagonal domed churches of the three-aisled type.

The Throne Hall of Dongola, built in the 9th century at Old Dongola, was used by the kings of Makuria, the most powerful kingdom in medieval Africa, for 450 years until 1317. The upper floor contained a likely cruciform room with a small dome at the center, in imitation of the audience halls of the Byzantine emperors. Bulgarian tsars had similar halls.

=== The Balkans ===
Similarities to the architecture of Armenia and the "Eastern Christian world" have been noted for the architecture of early Croatia, from about 800 to 1100, along with similarities with western Pre-Romanesque architecture. In the Balkans, where Byzantine rule weakened in the 7th and 8th centuries, domed architecture may represent Byzantine influence or, in the case of the centrally planned churches of 9th-century Dalmatia, the revival of earlier Roman mausoleum types. An interest in Roman models may have been an expression of the religious maneuvering of the region between the Church of Constantinople and that of Rome. Examples include the Church of Sv. Luka in Kotor, the Church of Sv. Trojce near Split, and the early 9th century Church of Sv. Donat in Zadar. The Church of Sv. Donat, originally domed, may have been built next to a palace and resembles palace churches in the Byzantine tradition. The ruins at the church of St. Mary on the Island in Solin (before 976) may have had a dome over its square bay. The Church of St. Peter on Priko (c. 1050-1075) includes a dome on pendentives in its central bay. It is hidden on the exterior by a square turret with a pyramidal roof. The chapel of St. Nicholas (c. 1100) on the island of Lopud is similar to the Church of St. Peter on Priko and includes a dome over its central bay.

The architectural chronology of the central and eastern Balkans is unsettled during the period of the First Bulgarian Empire, in part because of similarity between Justinian-era churches from the 6th century and what may have been a revival of that style in the late 9th and early 10th centuries under the Christianized Bulgarian tsars. Remains of the Round Church in Preslav, a building traditionally associated with the rule of Tsar Simeon (893–927), indicate that it was a domed palace chapel. Its construction features, however, resemble instead 3rd and 4th century Roman mausolea, perhaps due to the association of those structures with the imperial idea.

In Dalmatia, a group of six lobed centralized buildings similar to antique models are known from the 9th to the 11th centuries: in Brnazi, Pridraga, Split, Oslje, Zara, and Trogir.

=== The Rus' ===
Byzantine architecture was introduced to the Rus' people in the 10th century, with churches after the conversion of Prince Vladimir of Kiev being modeled after those of Constantinople, but made of wood. The Russian onion dome was a later development. The earliest architecture of Kiev, the vast majority of which was made of wood, has been lost to fire, but by the 12th century masonry domes on low drums in Kiev and Vladimir-Suzdal were little different than Byzantine domes, although modified toward the "helmet" type with a slight point. The Cathedral of St. Sophia in Kiev (1018–37) was distinctive in having thirteen domes, for Jesus and the Twelve Apostles, but they have since been remodeled in the Baroque style and combined with an additional eight domes. The pyramidal arrangement of the domes was a Byzantine characteristic, although, as the largest and perhaps most important 11th century building in the Byzantine tradition, many of the details of this building have disputed origins.

Bulbous onion domes on tall drums were a development of northern Russia, perhaps due to the demands of heavy ice and snowfall along with the more rapid innovation permitted by the Novgorod region's emphasis on wooden architecture. The central dome of the Cathedral of St. Sophia (1045–62) in Novgorod dates from the 12th century and shows a transitional stage. Other churches built around this time are those of St. Nicholas (1113), the Nativity of the Virgin (1117), and St. George (1119–30).

Eastern European and Orthodox examples

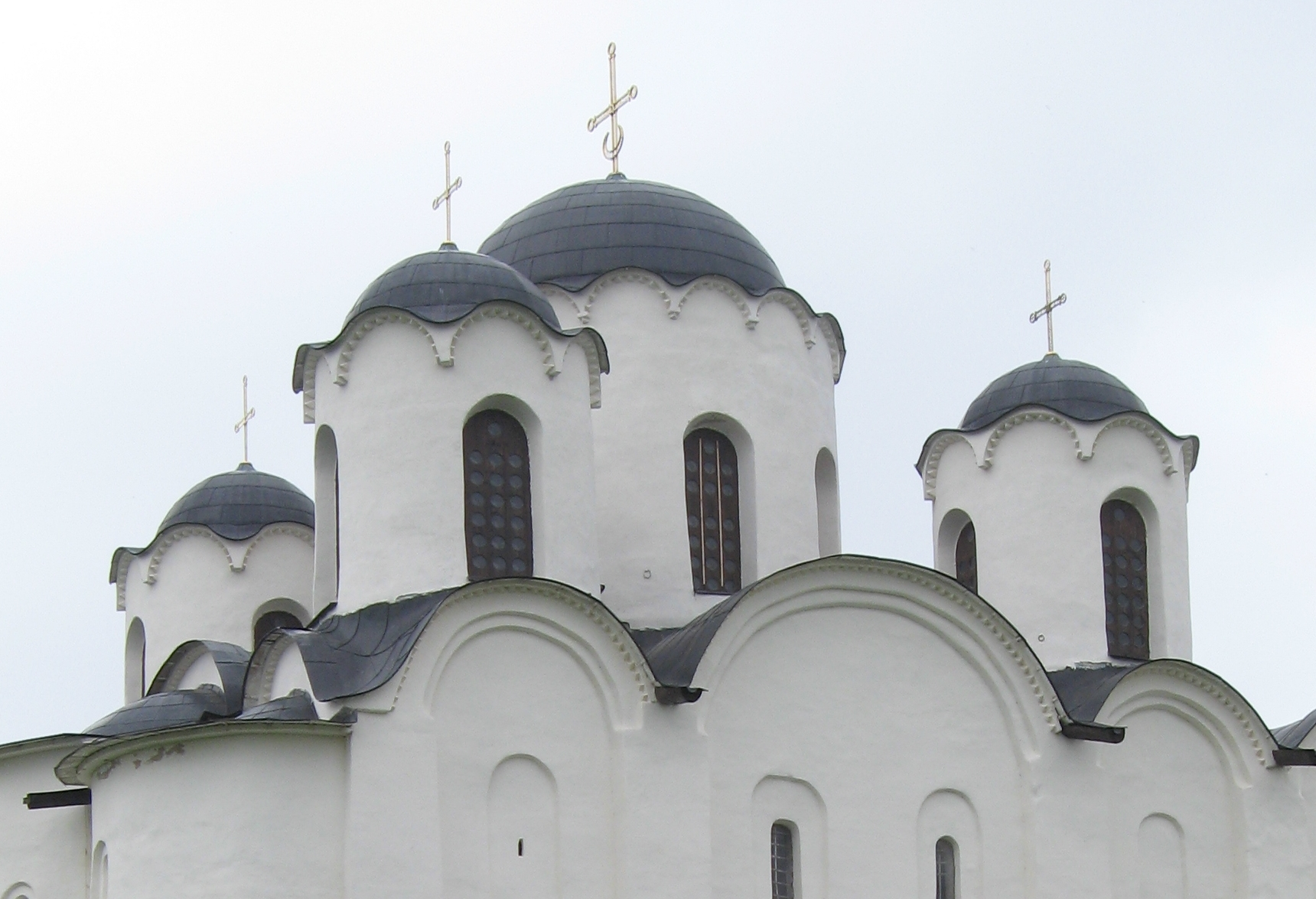
Saint Nicholas Cathedral, Novgorod

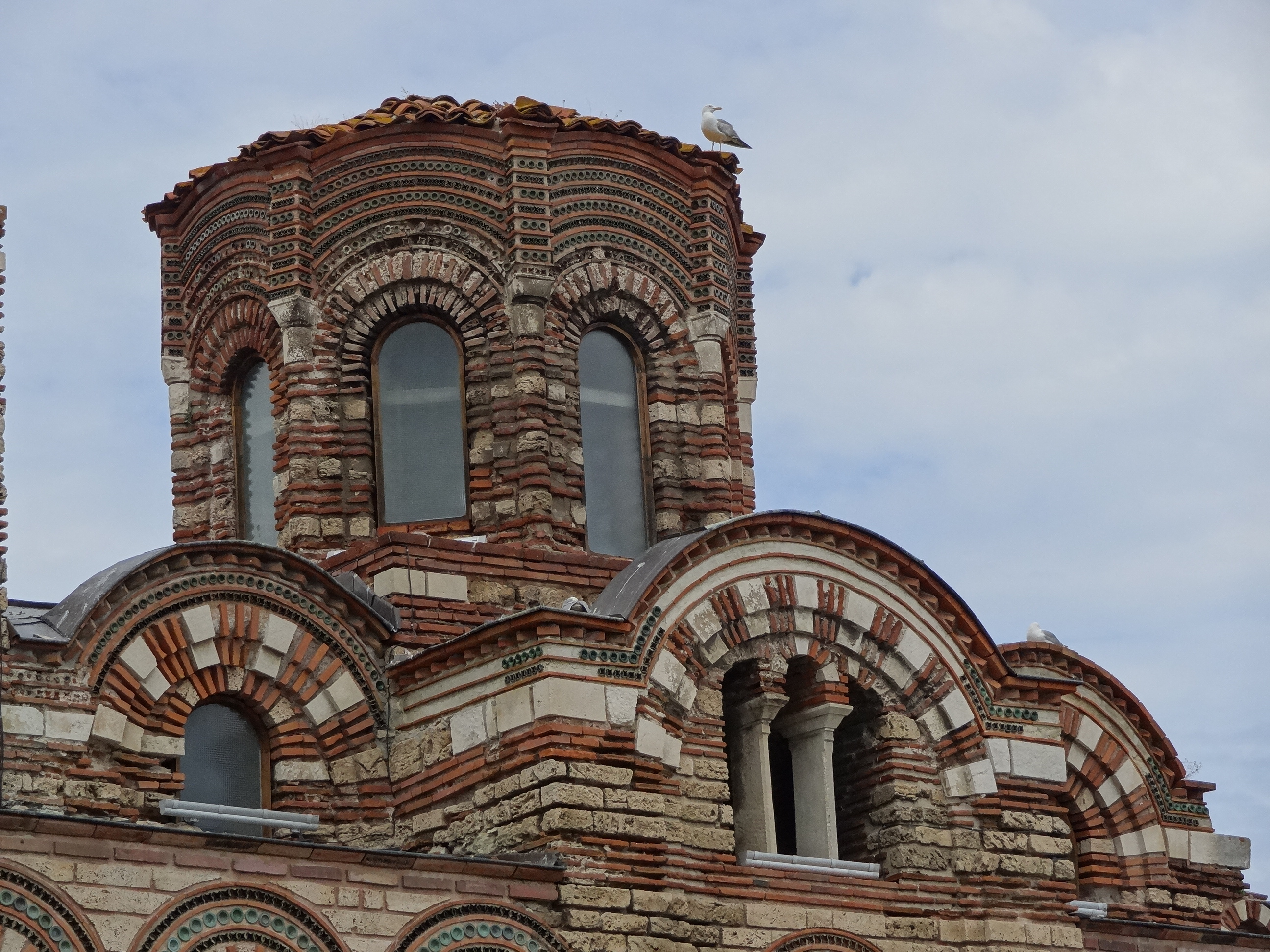
Church of Christ Pantocrator, Nesebar, Bulgaria

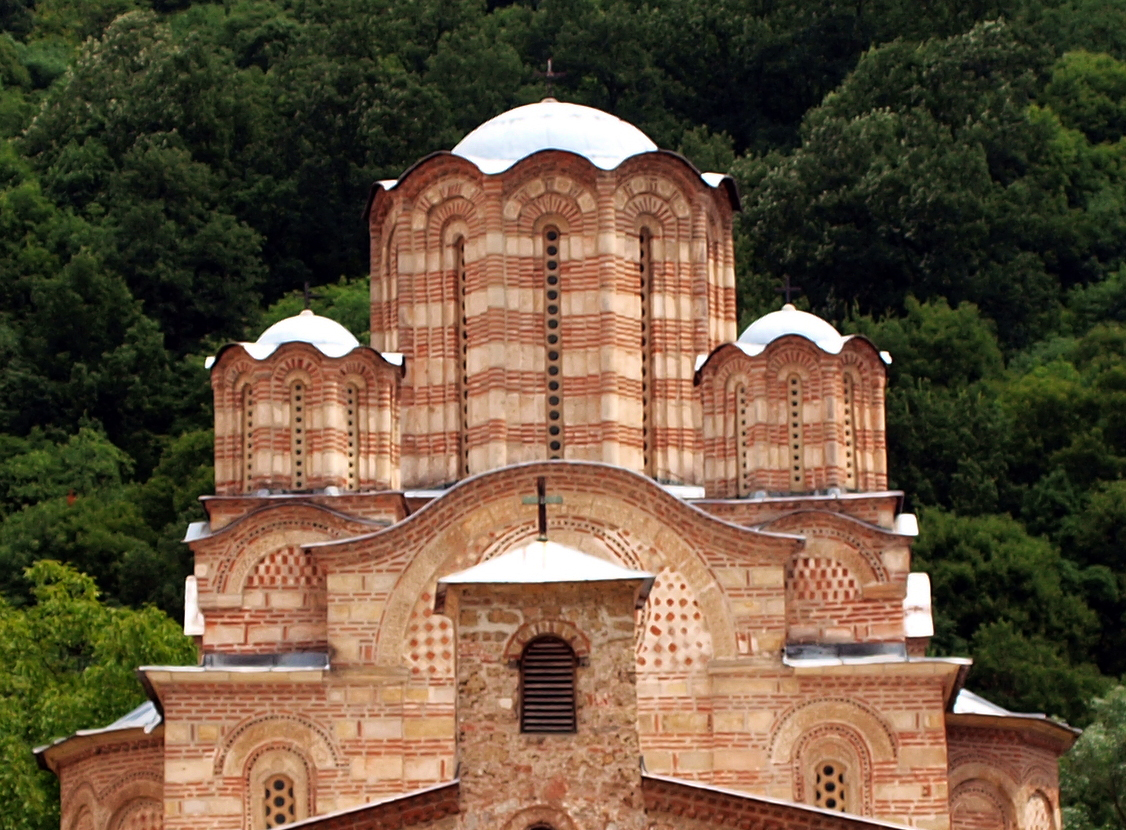
Ravanica Monastery, Serbia

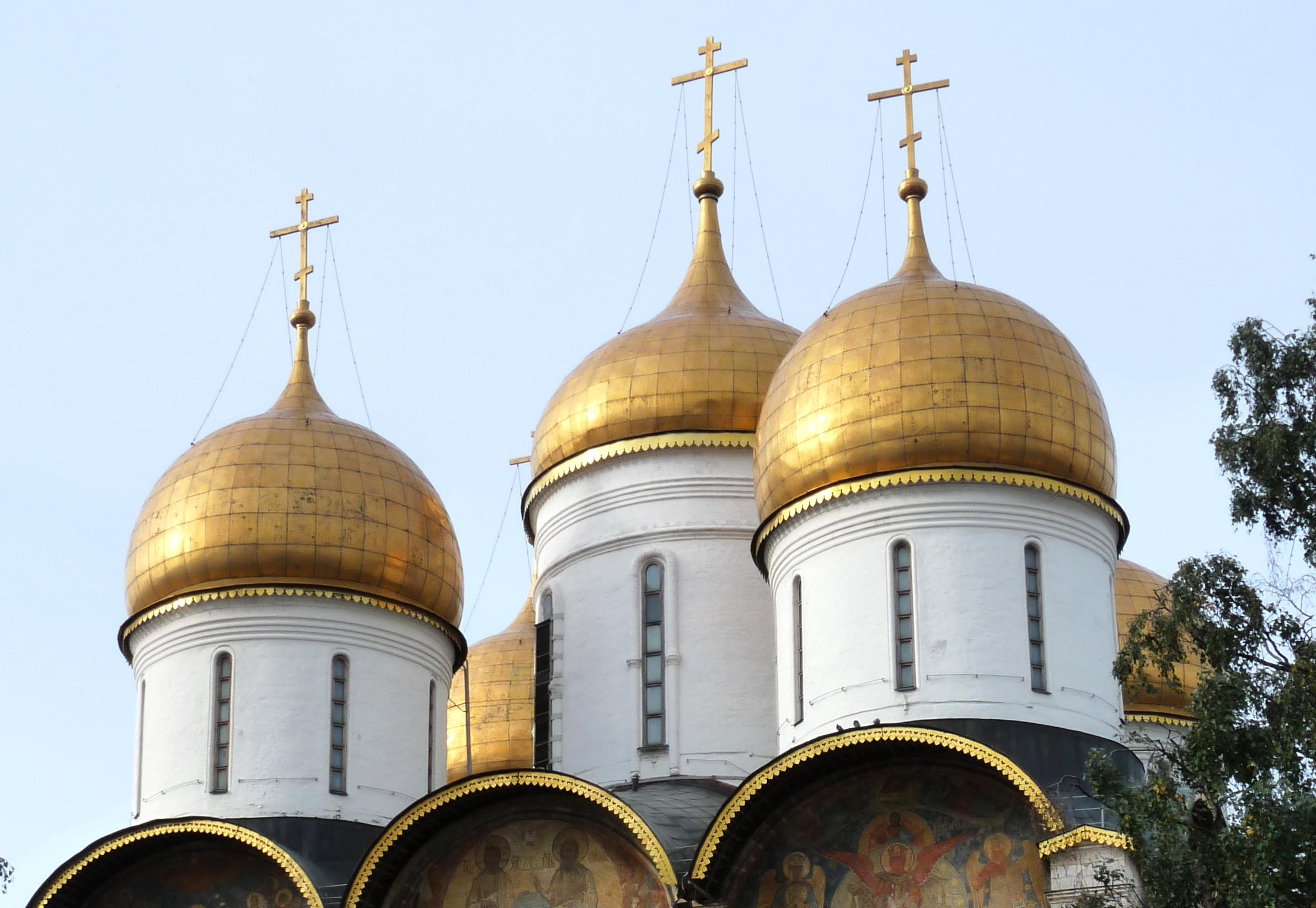
Cathedral of the Assumption, Moscow

=== Romanesque Europe ===
In Romanesque Italy, Byzantine influence can most clearly be seen in Venice's St Mark's Basilica, from about 1063, but also in the domed churches of southern Italy, such as Canosa Cathedral (1071 or 6th century) and the old Cathedral of Molfetta (c. 1160).

In Norman Sicily, architecture was a fusion of Byzantine, Islamic, and Romanesque forms, but the dome of the Palatine Chapel (1132–43) at Palermo was decorated with Byzantine mosaic, as was that of the church of Santa Maria dell'Ammiraglio (1140s).

The unusual use of domes on pendentives in a series of seventy Romanesque churches in the Aquitaine region of France strongly suggests a Byzantine influence. St. Mark's Basilica was modeled on the now-lost Byzantine Church of the Holy Apostles in Constantinople, and Périgueux Cathedral in Aquitaine (c. 1120) likewise has five domes on pendentives in a Greek cross arrangement. Other examples include the domed naves of Angoulême Cathedral (1105–28), Cahors Cathedral (c. 1100–1119), and the Abbey church of Sainte-Marie in Souillac (c. 1130).

=== Orthodox Europe ===
Byzantium's neighboring Orthodox powers in Europe emerged as architectural centers in their own right during the Late Byzantine Period. The Bulgarian churches of Nesebar are similar to those in Constantinople at this time. The style and vaulting in the Nesebar cross-in-square churches of Christ Pantocrator and St John Aliturgetos, for example, are similar to examples in Constantinople.

The Gračanica monastery is an example of a five-domed cross-in-square church in the Late Byzantine style, built around 1311 in Serbia. The architect and artisans of the Gračanica monastery church probably came from Thessaloniki and its style reflects Byzantine cultural influence. The church has been said to represent "the culmination of Late Byzantine architectural design." Following the construction of Gračanica monastery, the architecture of Serbia used the "so-called Athonite plan", for example at Ravanica (1375–7). Domes over an entranceway were royal markers. An example is the Serbian reconstruction of the katholikon of the Monastery of Hilandar (1312-1316), which included a domical vault over the central eastern bay of the narthex. The church of St. Nicholas of Dabar at Banja Monastery (1329) has the earliest example in Serbia of a dome over a narthex, similar to Byzantine examples from the Despotate of Epirus. Serbian churches included domes in the Byzantine style around the 1330s and they increased in use through the period of the Serbian Empire.

In Romania, Wallachia was influenced by Serbian architecture and Moldavia was more original, such as in the Voroneț Monastery with its small dome.

Moscow emerged as the most important center of architecture following the fall of Constantinople in 1453. The Cathedral of the Assumption (1475–79), built in the Kremlin to house the icon of Our Lady of Vladimir, was designed in a traditional Russian style by an Italian architect.

=== Italian Renaissance ===
Italian Renaissance architecture combined Roman and Romanesque practices with Byzantine structures and decorative elements, such as domes with pendentives over square bays. The Cassinese Congregation used windowed domes in the Byzantine style, and often also in a quincunx arrangement, in their churches built between 1490 and 1546, such as the Abbey of Santa Giustina.

The technique of using wooden tension rings at several levels within domes and drums to resist deformation, frequently said to be a later invention of Filippo Brunelleschi, was common practice in Byzantine architecture. The technique of using double shells for domes, although revived in the Renaissance, originated in Byzantine practice.

The dome of the Pantheon, as a symbol of Rome and its monumental past, was particularly celebrated and imitated, although copied only loosely. Studied in detail from the early Renaissance on, it was an explicit point of reference for the dome of St. Peter's Basilica and inspired the construction of domed rotundas with temple-front porches throughout western architecture into the modern era. Examples include Palladio's chapel at Maser (1579–80), Bernini's church of S. Maria dell'Assunzione (1662-4), the Library Rotunda of the University of Virginia (1817–26), and the church of St. Mary in Malta (1833–60). Other examples include the church of San Simeone Piccolo in Venice (1718–38), the church of Gran Madre di Dio in Turin (1818–31), and the church of San Francesco di Paola, Naples in Naples (19th century).

=== Ottoman Empire ===
Ottoman architecture adopted the Byzantine dome form and continued to develop it. One type of mosque was modeled after Justinian's Church of Sergius and Bacchus with a dome over an octagon or hexagon contained within a square, such as the Üç Şerefeli Mosque (1437–47). The dome and semi-domes of the Hagia Sophia, in particular, were replicated and refined. A "universal mosque design" based upon this development spread throughout the world. The first Ottoman mosque to use a dome and semi-dome nave vaulting scheme like that of Hagia Sophia was the mosque of Beyazit II. Only two others were modeled similarly: Kılıç Ali Pasha Mosque and the Süleymaniye Mosque (1550–57). Other Ottoman mosques, although superficially similar to Hagia Sophia, have been described as structural criticisms of it. When Mimar Sinan set out to build a dome larger than that of Hagia Sophia with Selimiye Mosque (1569–74), he used a more stable octagonal supporting structure. The Selimiye Mosque is of the type originating with the Church of Sergius and Bacchus. Three other Imperial mosques in Istanbul built in this "Classical Style" of Hagia Sophia include four large semi-domes around the central dome, rather than two: Şehzade Camii, Sultan Ahmed I Camii (completed in 1616), and the last to be built: Yeni Cami (1597–1663).

Western European and Ottoman examples

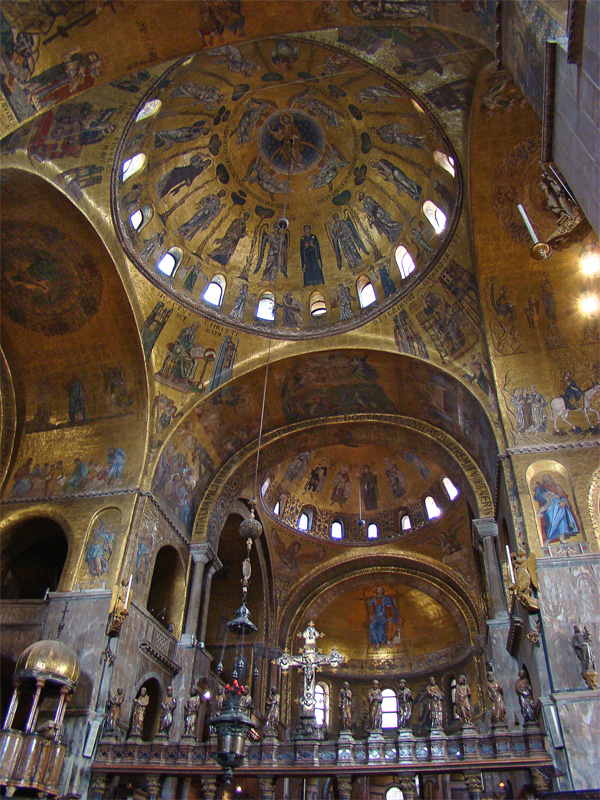
St Mark's Basilica, Venice

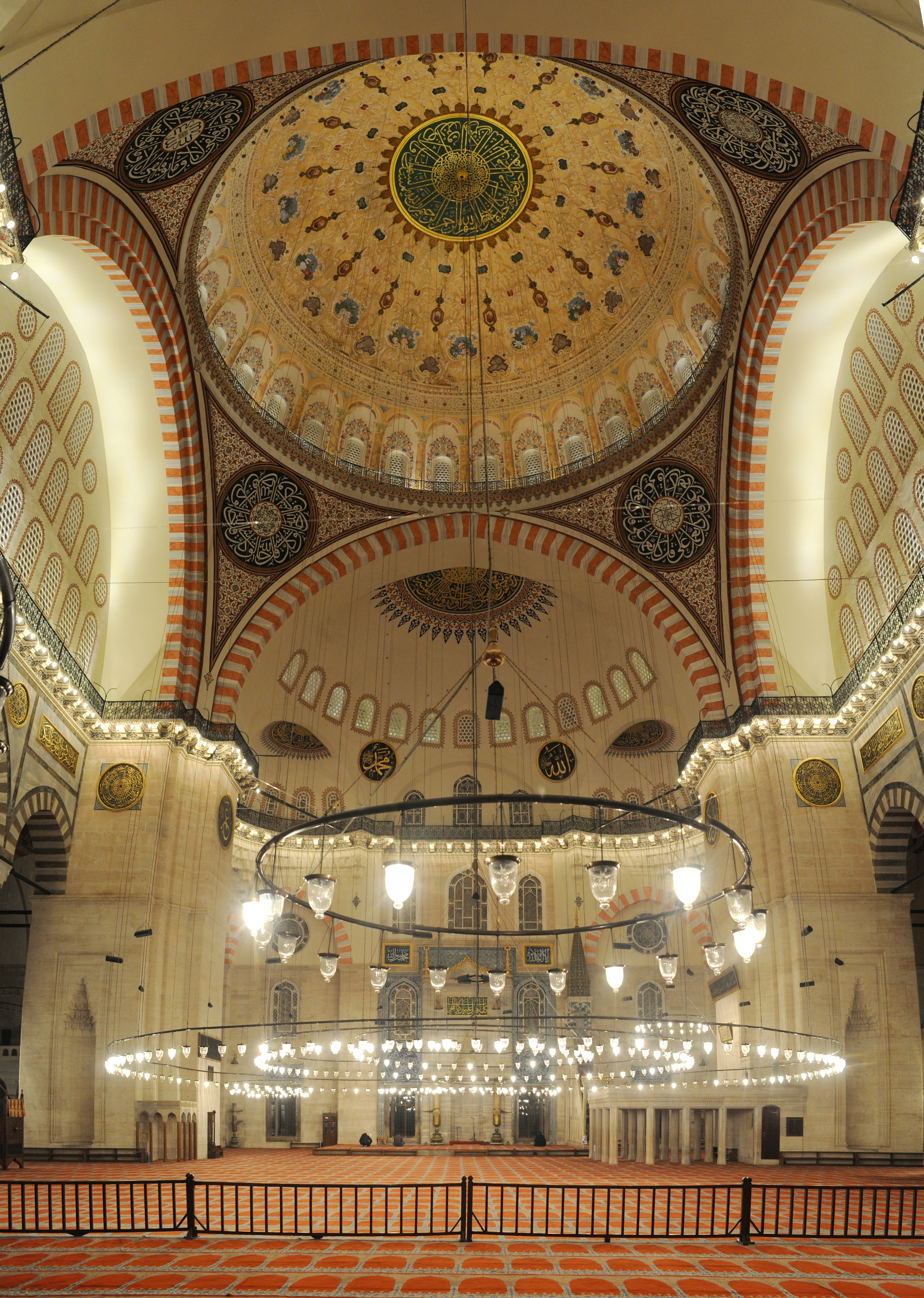
Süleymaniye Mosque, Istanbul

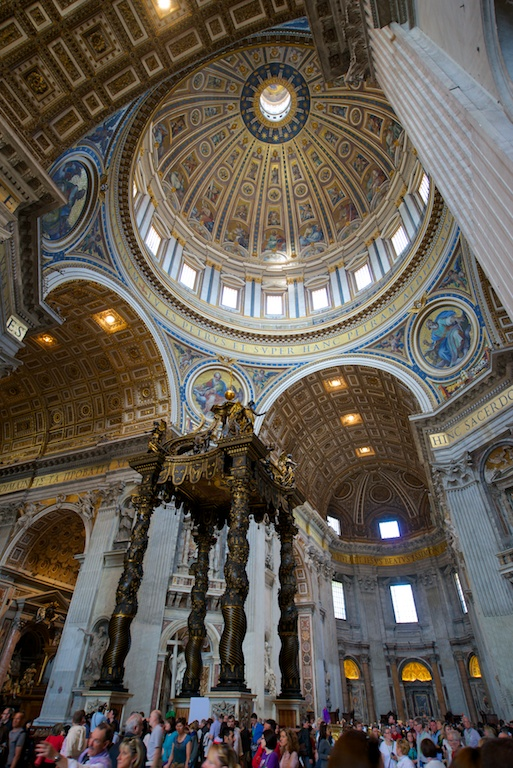
St. Peter's Basilica, Rome

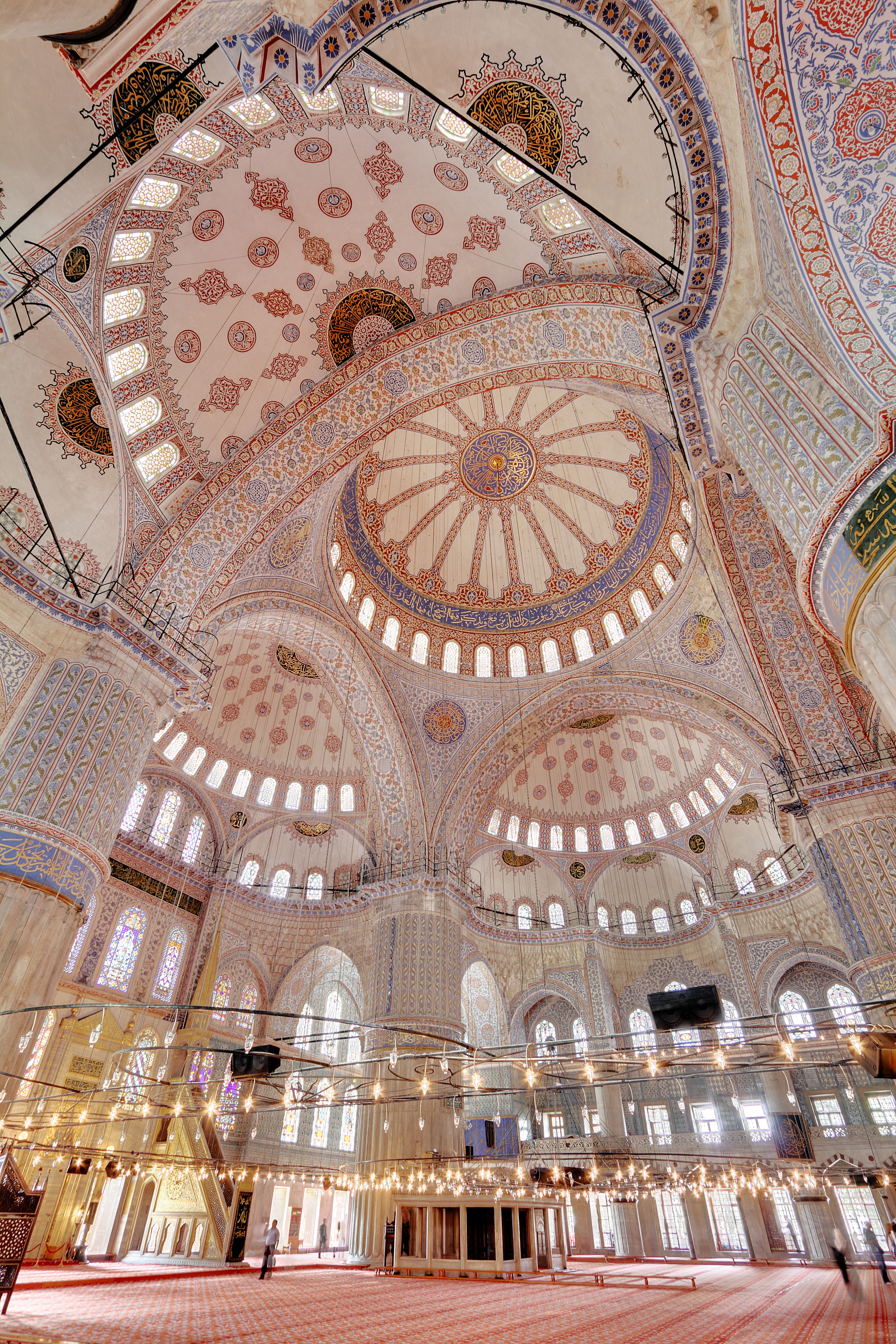
Sultan Ahmed Mosque, Istanbul

=== Modern revival ===
A Byzantine revival style of architecture occurred in the 19th and 20th centuries. An early example of the revival style in Russia was the Cathedral of Christ the Saviour (1839–84), which was approved by the Tsar to be a model for other churches in the empire. The style's popularity spread through scholarly publications produced after the independence of Greece and the Balkans from the Ottoman Empire. It was used throughout Europe and North America, peaking in popularity between 1890 and 1914. The Greek Orthodox St Sophia's Cathedral (1877–79) and Roman Catholic Westminster Cathedral (begun 1895), both in London, are examples. The throne room of Neuschwanstein Castle (1885–86) was built by King Ludwig II in Bavaria. In the late 19th century, the Hagia Sophia became a widespread model for Greek Orthodox churches. In southeastern Europe, monumental national cathedrals built in the capital cities of formerly Ottoman areas used Neo-Classical or Neo-Byzantine styles. Sofia's Alexander Nevsky Cathedral and Belgrade's Church of Saint Sava are examples, and used Hagia Sophia as a model due to their large sizes. Synagogues in the United States were built in a variety of styles, as they had been in Europe (and often with a mixture of elements from different styles), but the Byzantine Revival style was the most popular in the 1920s. Domed examples include The Temple of Cleveland (1924), the synagogue of KAM Isaiah Israel (1924) in Chicago, based upon San Vitale in Ravenna and Hagia Sophia in Istanbul, and the synagogue of Congregation Emanu-El (1926) in San Francisco.

In the United States, Greek Orthodox churches beginning in the 1950s tended to use a large central dome with a ring of windows at its base evocative of the central dome of Hagia Sophia, rather than more recent or more historically common Byzantine types, such as the Greek-cross-octagon or five-domed quincunx plans. Examples include Annunciation Greek Orthodox Church, completed in 1961 but designed by Frank Lloyd Wright in 1957, Ascension Greek Orthodox Cathedral of Oakland (1960), and Annunciation Greek Orthodox Cathedral in Atlanta (1967). The use of a large central dome in American Greek Orthodox churches continued in the 1960s and 1970s before moving toward smaller Middle Byzantine domes, or versions of Early Christian basilicas.

== See also ==
- List of Roman domes
- History of architecture
