= Argina, Armenia =

Village in Armavir, Armenia

Argina Արգինա
- Location within Armenia
- Coordinates: 40°15′N 43°42′E
- Country: Armenia
- Marz (Province): Armavir

Population (2011)
  - Total: 534
- Time zone: UTC+4 ( )

Argina (Armenian: Արգինա) is a village in the Armavir Province of Armenia. The town was named after the Argina Monastery, which is across the border in Turkey.

== See also ==
- Armavir Province
