= Byzantine Bath (Thessaloniki) =

UNESCO World Heritage Site
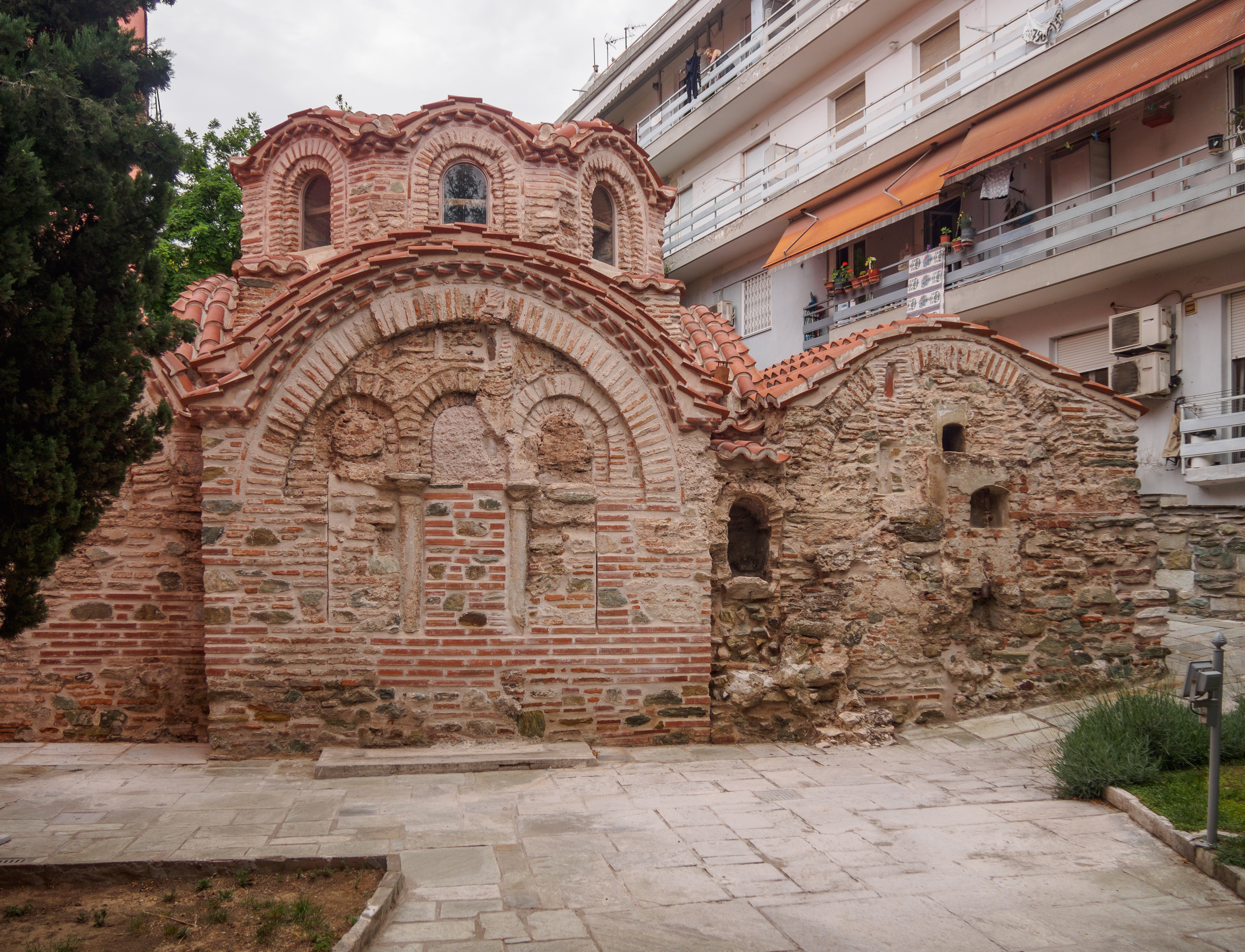
- The bath after its restoration

- Location within Greece
- Location: Thessaloniki, Macedonia, Greece
- Part of: Paleochristian and Byzantine monuments of Thessaloniki
- Criteria: Cultural: (i), (ii), (iv)
- Reference: 456-015
- Inscription: 1988 (12th Session)
- Area: 0.049 ha (0.12 acres)
- Coordinates: 40°38′22.5″N 22°57′9.5″E

The Byzantine Bath of the Upper City (Greek: Βυζαντινά Λουτρά Άνω Πόλης, Vyzantiná Loutrá Áno Pólis) in Thessaloniki is one of the few and best preserved of the Byzantine baths that have survived from the Byzantine period in Greece. It is located on the Theotokopoulou Street in the Upper Old Town of Thessaloniki.

The baths date to the late 12th/early 13th century, and functioned continuously until 1940, when they shut down probably due to World War II and the German occupation of Greece. The Byzantine sources do not mention it, hence it is likely that it originally belonged to a monastery complex. In Ottoman times, it was known as Kule Hammam, i.e. "bath of the tower".

The bath's long use led to numerous alterations of the original structure over time. The original architecture follows the typical conventions of Roman baths. The original entrance in the south leads to the rectangular frigidarium rooms, which were used as dressing rooms. Then came two vaulted tepidarium rooms and finally two caldarium rooms. The latter were square in shape and featured hypocausts below the floor. One was covered by a dome supported by an octagonal base with eight windows, the other had a domed ceiling. To the north of the baths was the cistern that provided it with water, with a hearth beneath to warm it. In Byzantine times the building was alternately used by men and women, but in the Ottoman period the bath was divided into exclusively male and female sections, by blocking off each pair of rooms from each other.

The bath was one of several in the city—the 14th-century writer Nikephoros Choumnos claims that Thessaloniki had more baths than inhabitants—but is the only surviving in Thessaloniki and the largest and most complete of the handful of Byzantine baths surviving elsewhere in Greece: five ruined public baths—two in Corinth, one in Sparta, one in Paramythia, one in Ioannina Castle—and one each in the monasteries of Kaisariani and Zoodochos Pigi.

Although closed since 1940, the bath was subject to neglect and damage during the 1978 earthquakes, and only survived standing through heavy propping up by the 9th Ephorate of Byzantine Antiquities and the protection offered by an external metal sheet covering. In 1988, it was included among the Paleochristian and Byzantine monuments of Thessaloniki on the list of World Heritage Sites by UNESCO.

Following four years of restoration work, the bath was re-opened to the public as a museum and cultural space in June 2015.

== Sources ==
- Kourkoutidou-Nikolaidou, E.; Tourta, A. (1997), Wandering in Byzantine Thessaloniki, Kapon Editions, ISBN 960-7254-47-3
