= Church of St. Panteleimon, Thessaloniki =

Church and heritage site in Thessaloniki, Greece

Church of Saint Panteleimon
- Holy Church of Saint Panteleimon
- Ναός Αγίου Παντελεήμονα
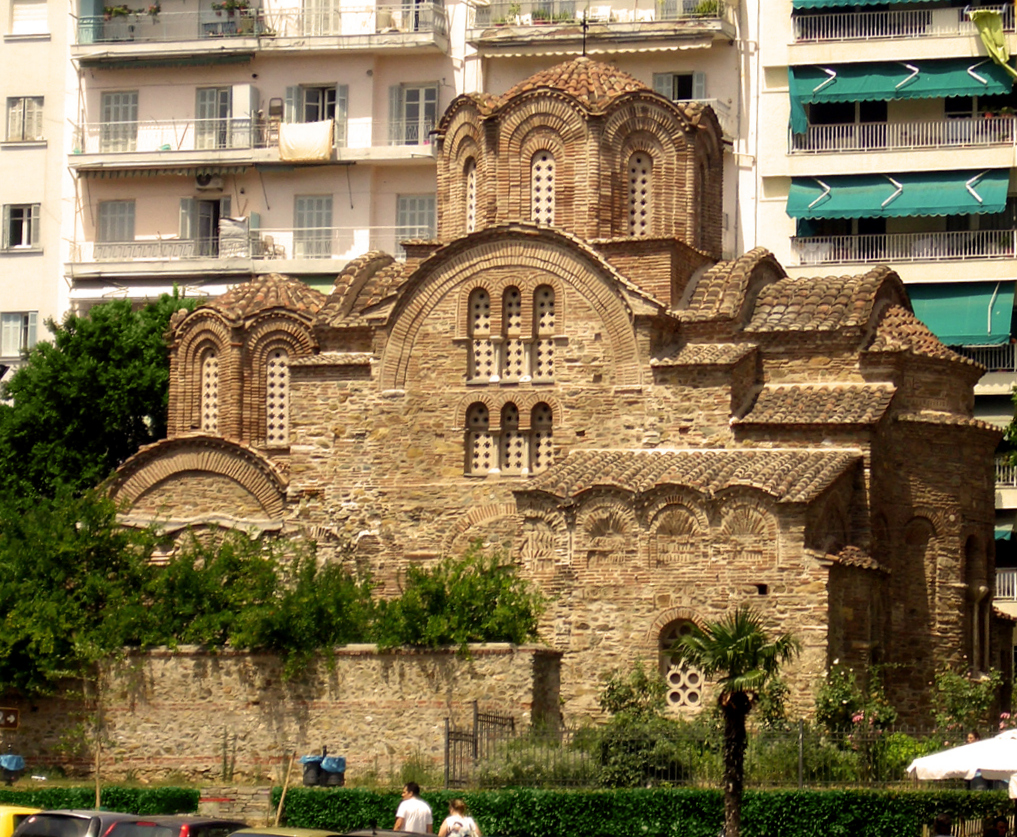

- Location of the church in Greece
- Church of Saint Panteleimon
- 40°37′59″N 22°57′4″E
- Location: Corner of Arrianou and Iasonidou Streets, Thessaloniki, Central Macedonia
- Country: Greece
- Language: Greek
- Denomination: Greek Orthodox
- Previous denomination: Islam (1548–1912)

History
- Former names: Monastery of the Virgin Peribleptos; Monastery of Kyr Isaac; Turkish: İshakiye Camii (as a mosque)
- Status: Church (14th century–1548); Mosque (1548–1912); Church (since 1912– )
- Dedication: Saint Panteleimon
- Dedicated: 1912

Architecture
- Functional status: Active
- Architectural type: Church
- Style: Byzantine
- Completed: 14th century

Administration
- Metropolis: Thessaloniki

Clergy
- Priest: Archim. Vakalakis Euthimios
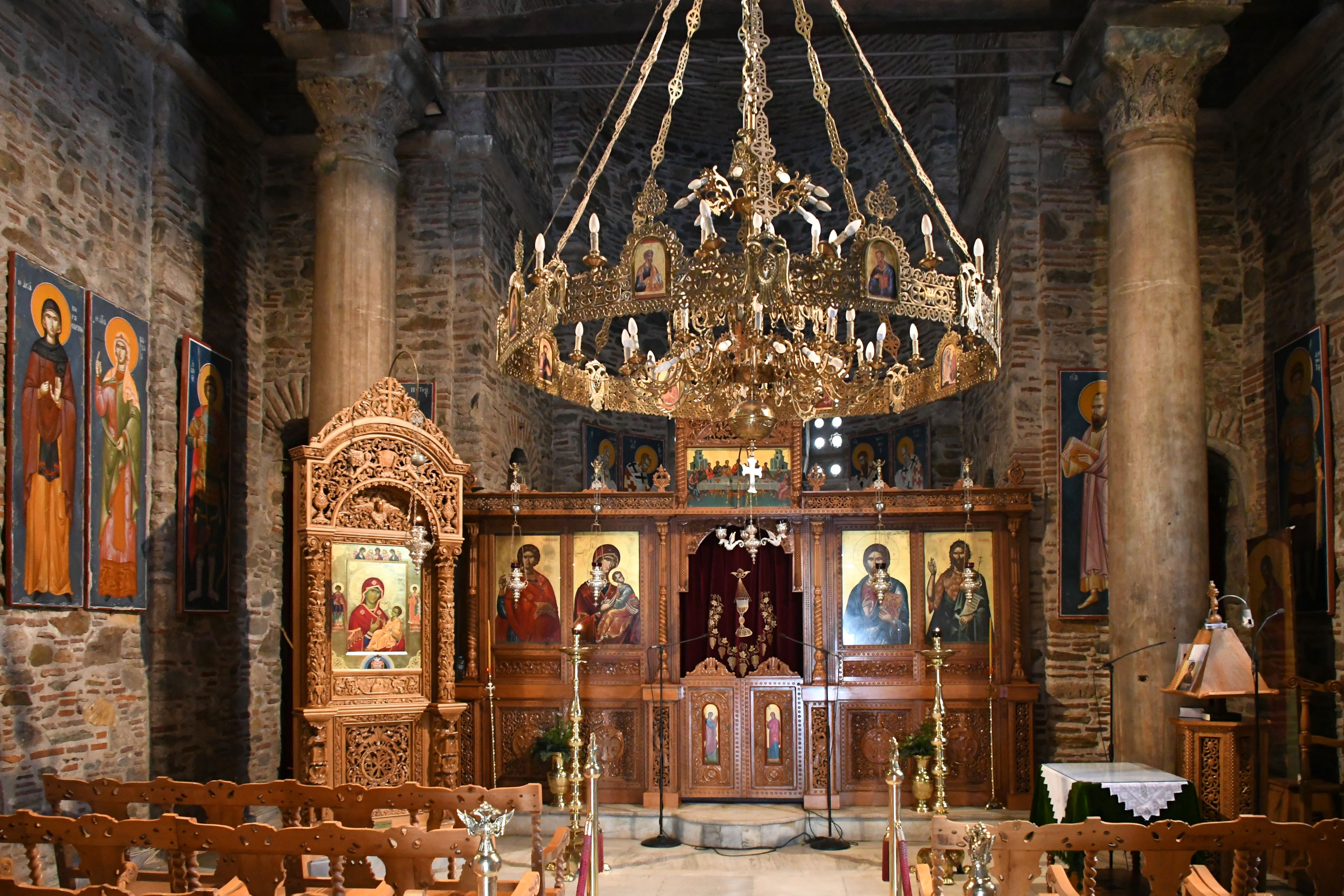
- The church interior

UNESCO World Heritage Site
- Part of: Paleochristian and Byzantine monuments of Thessaloniki
- Criteria: Cultural: (i), (ii), (iv)
- Inscription: 1988 (12th Session)
- Area: 0.174 ha (0.43 acres)

The Church of Saint Panteleimon (Greek: Ναός Αγίου Παντελεήμονα, romanized: Naós Agíou Panteleímona), officially the Holy Church of Saint Panteleimon (Ιερός Ναός Αγίου Παντελεήμονος), is a Greek Orthodox church located in Thessaloniki, in the Central Macedonia region of Greece. The Byzantine-era church was built in the 14th century. Because of its well-preserved Byzantine architecture and its testimony to the importance of Thessaloniki to early and medieval Christianity, the church was inscribed on the UNESCO World Heritage List in 1988 along with fourteen other Paleochristian and Byzantine monuments of Thessaloniki.

== History ==
The church lies in the eastern part of the old city, near the Tomb of Galerius (the "Rotunda"), at the intersection of Iasonidou and Arrianou streets. Its current dedication to Saint Panteleimon was given to the church after the end of Ottoman rule in 1912, and its original dedication is therefore disputed. In 1548, during the Ottoman era, it was converted into a mosque and became known as Turkish: İshakiye Camii, lit. 'Mosque of Ishak (Isaac)', which in the prevailing scholarly interpretation points to an identification with the late-Byzantine-era Monastery of the Virgin Peribleptos, also known as the Monastery of Kyr Isaac after its founder Jacob, who was the city's metropolitan bishop in 1295–1315 and became a monk with the monastic name of Isaac. A counter-argument however supports the theory that the present church is unrelated to the Peribleptos Monastery, and that it was converted into a mosque c. 1500, when the city's kadı (judge), was Ishak Çelebi, whom the mosque was named after. However, the church's architecture and decoration, which date to the late 13th/early 14th centuries, appear to support the former view.

The church is of the tetrastyle cross-in-square type, with a narthex and a (now destroyed) ambulatory that is connected to two chapels (still extant). Very few of the building's original wall paintings survive. Ottoman remains include the base of the demolished minaret and a marble fountain.

== See also ==
- Ancient Roman and Byzantine domes
- Islam in Greece
- List of Eastern Orthodox church buildings in Greece
- List of former mosques in Greece
- Ottoman Greece
