= Church of St. Catherine, Thessaloniki =

Church and heritage site in Thessaloniki, Greece

Church of Saint Catherine
- Αγία Αικατερίνη
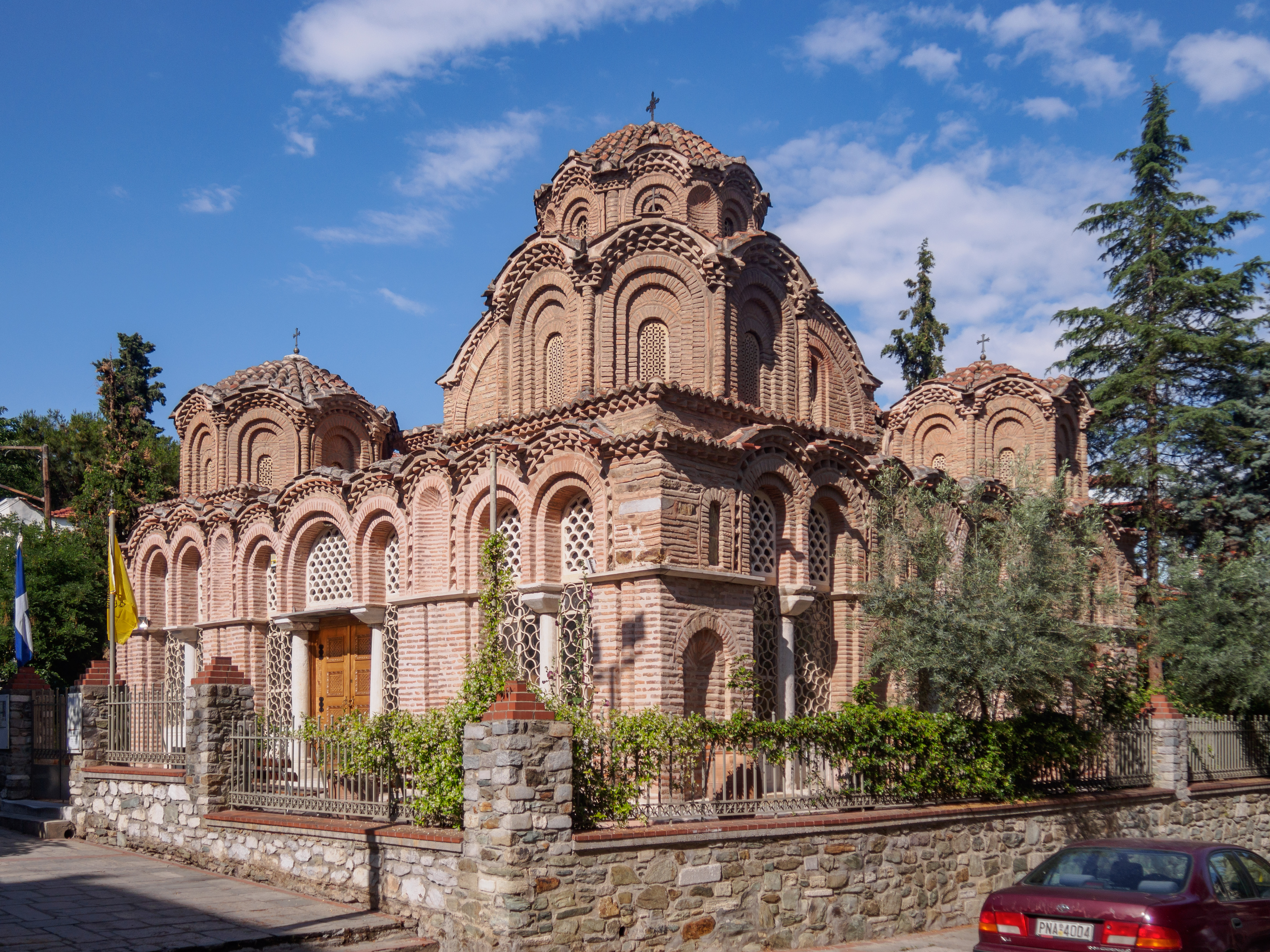
- Exterior of the church in 2019

- Location of the church in Greece
- Church of Saint Catherine
- 40°38′36″N 22°56′40″E
- Location: Thessaloniki, Central Macedonia
- Country: Greece
- Language: Greek
- Denomination: Greek Orthodox
- Previous denomination: Islam (c. 16th century–1921)

History
- Former names: Monastery of the Almighty; Yakup Pasha Mosque
- Status: Katholikon (14th–16th centuries); Mosque (c. 16th century–1921); Church (since 1921– )
- Dedication: The great martyr Saint Catherine of Alexandria

Architecture
- Functional status: Active
- Architectural type: Monastery
- Style: Byzantine
- Completed: 14th century

Administration
- Metropolis: Thessaloniki

Clergy
- Priest: Fr. Eythimios Mertzanis
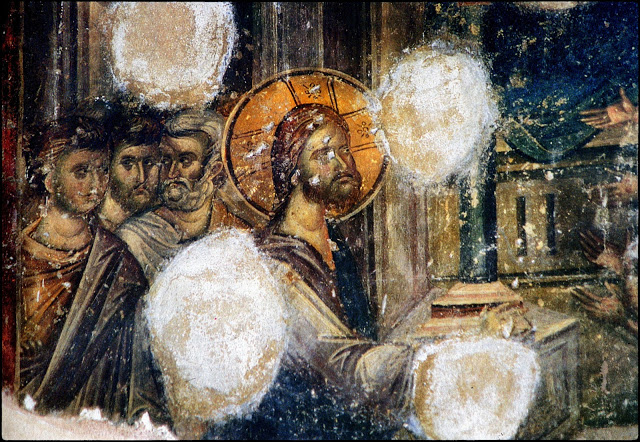
- A fresco inside the church

UNESCO World Heritage Site
- Part of: Paleochristian and Byzantine monuments of Thessaloniki
- Criteria: Cultural: (i), (ii), (iv)
- Reference: 456-011
- Inscription: 1988 (12th Session)
- Area: 0.083 ha (0.21 acres)

The Church of Saint Catherine (Greek: Αγία Αικατερίνη) is a late Byzantine-era Greek Orthodox church in the northwestern corner of the Ano Poli, Thessaloniki, in the Central Macedonia region of Greece. In 1988, it was one of fifteen structures inscribed on the UNESCO World Heritage List as the Paleochristian and Byzantine monuments of Thessaloniki.

== History ==
The church dates to the Palaiologan period, but its exact dating and original dedication are unknown. From its interior decoration, which survives in fragments and is dated to c. 1315, it has been suggested that it was the katholikon of the Monastery of the Almighty. It was converted to a mosque by Yakup Pasha in the reign of the Ottoman sultan Bayezid II (r. 1481–1512) and named after him Yakup Pasha Mosque (Turkish: Yakup Paşa Camii).

== See also ==
- Ancient Roman and Byzantine domes
- Islam in Greece
- List of Eastern Orthodox church buildings in Greece
- List of former mosques in Greece
- Ottoman Greece – Period of Ottoman rule of Greece
