= Paleochristian and Byzantine monuments of Thessaloniki =

UNESCO World Heritage Site
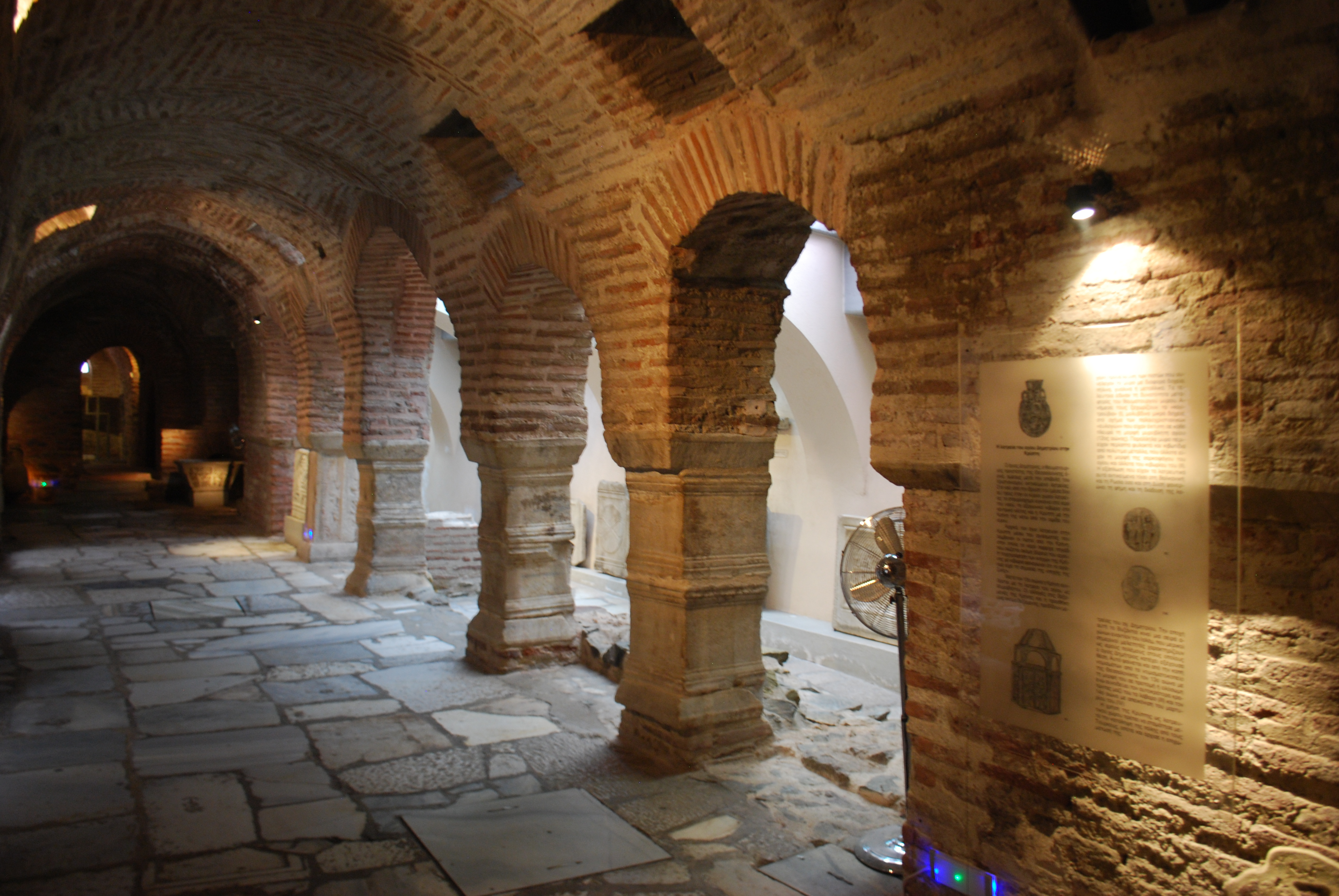
- Inside the crypt of Hagios Demetrios

- Location within Greece
- Location: Thessaloniki, Macedonia, Greece
- Criteria: Cultural: (i), (ii), (iv)
- Reference: 456
- Inscription: 1988 (12th Session)
- Area: 5.327 ha (13.16 acres)
- Coordinates: 40°38′18″N 22°57′54″E

The city of Thessaloniki in Macedonia, Greece, for several centuries the second-most important city of the Byzantine Empire, played an important role for Christianity during the Middle Ages and was decorated by impressive buildings. Because of Thessaloniki's importance during the early Christian and Byzantine periods, the city contains several Paleochristian monuments that have significantly contributed to the development of Byzantine art and architecture throughout the Byzantine Empire and Serbia. The evolution of Imperial Byzantine architecture and the prosperity of Thessaloniki go hand in hand, especially during the first years of the Empire, when the city continued to flourish. Despite the capture of Thessaloniki by the Ottoman Empire in 1430, the Christian monuments were not destroyed, and travelers such as Paul Lucas and Abdulmejid I document the city's wealth in Christian monuments during the Ottoman control of the city.

In 1988, fifteen monuments of Thessaloniki were listed as UNESCO World Heritage Sites:

1. City Walls (4th/5th centuries)
2. Rotunda of Saint George (4th century)
3. Church of Acheiropoietos (5th century)
4. Church of St. Demetrios (7th century)
5. Latomou Monastery (6th century)
6. Church of St. Sophia (8th century)
7. Church of Panagia Chalkeon (11th century)
8. Church of St. Panteleimon (14th century)
9. Church of the Holy Apostles (14th century)
10. Church of St. Nicholas Orphanos (14th century)
11. Church of St. Catherine (13th century)
12. Church of Christ Saviour (14th century)
13. Blatades Monastery (14th century)
14. Church of Prophet Elijah (14th century)
15. Byzantine Bath (14th century)

== Gallery ==
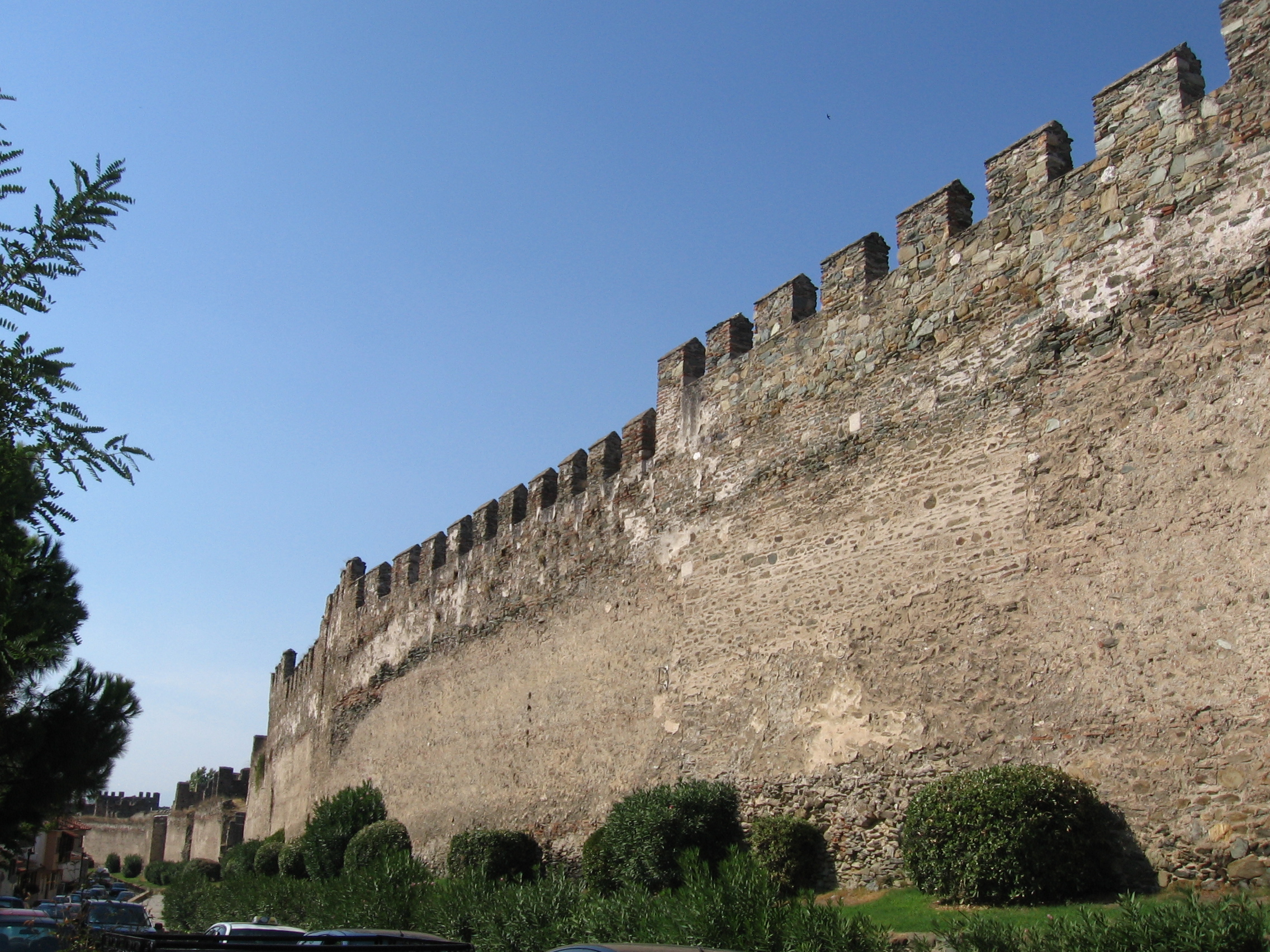
Walls of Thessaloniki

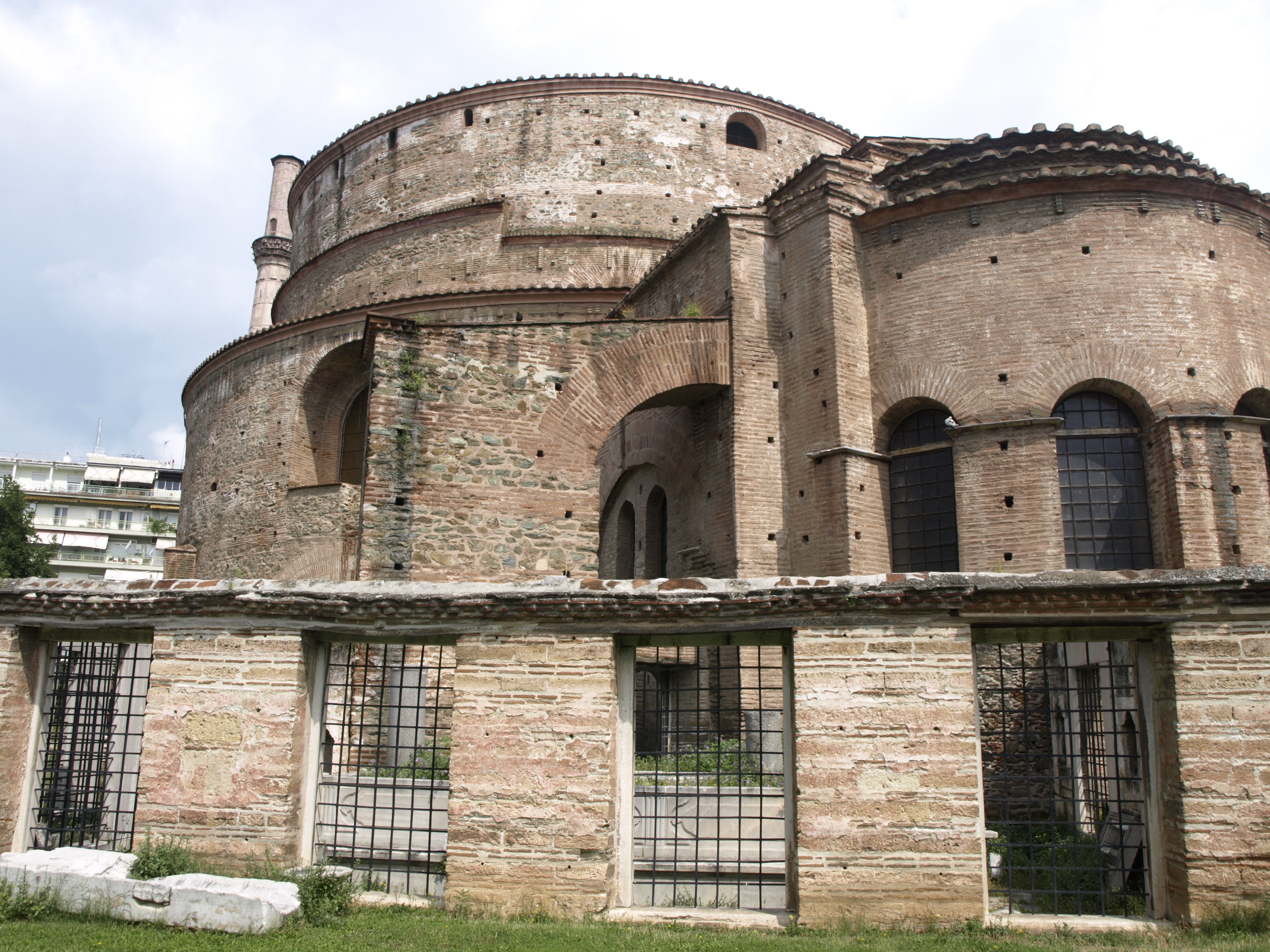
Rotunda of St George

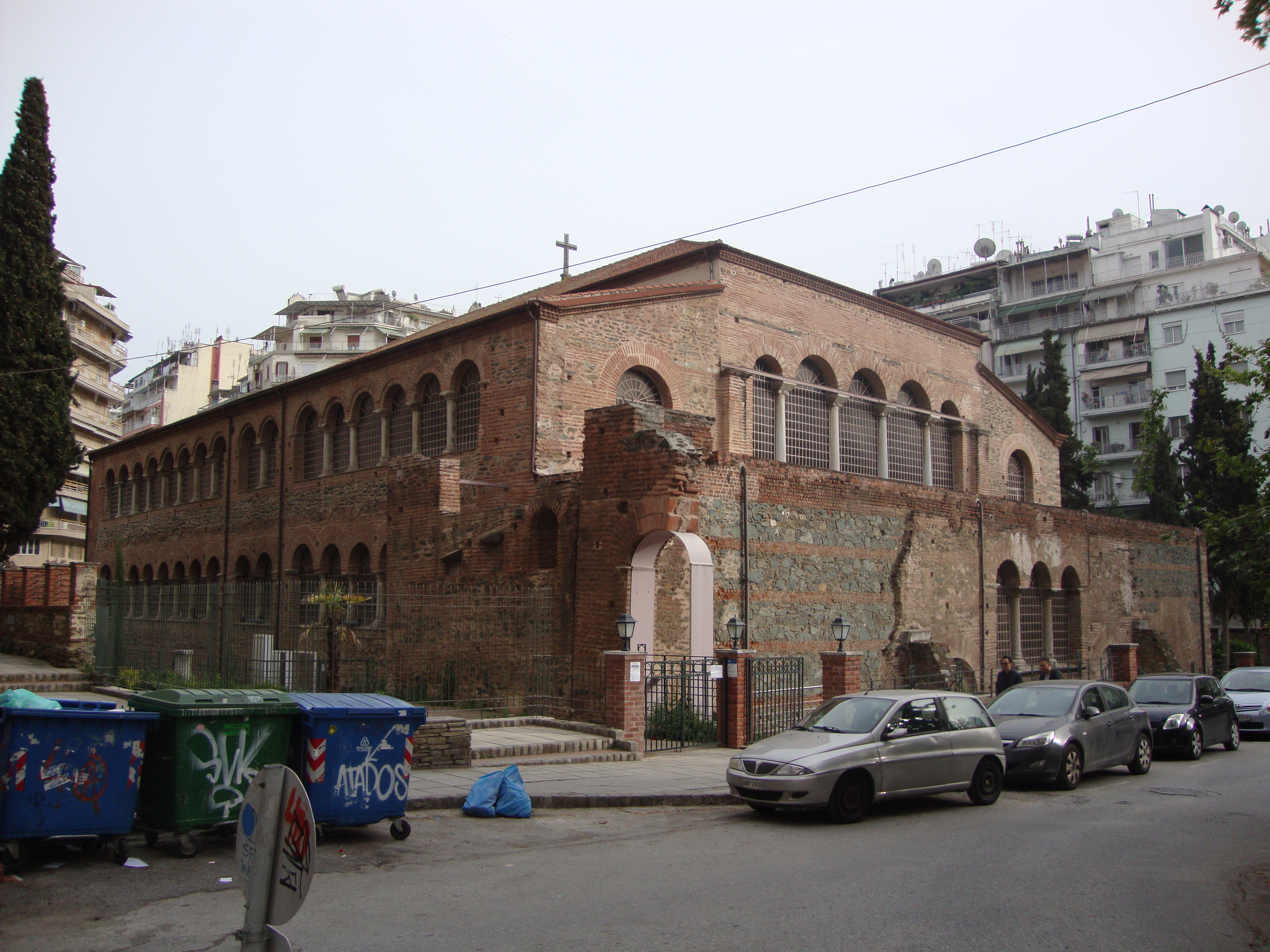
Church of the Acheiropoietos

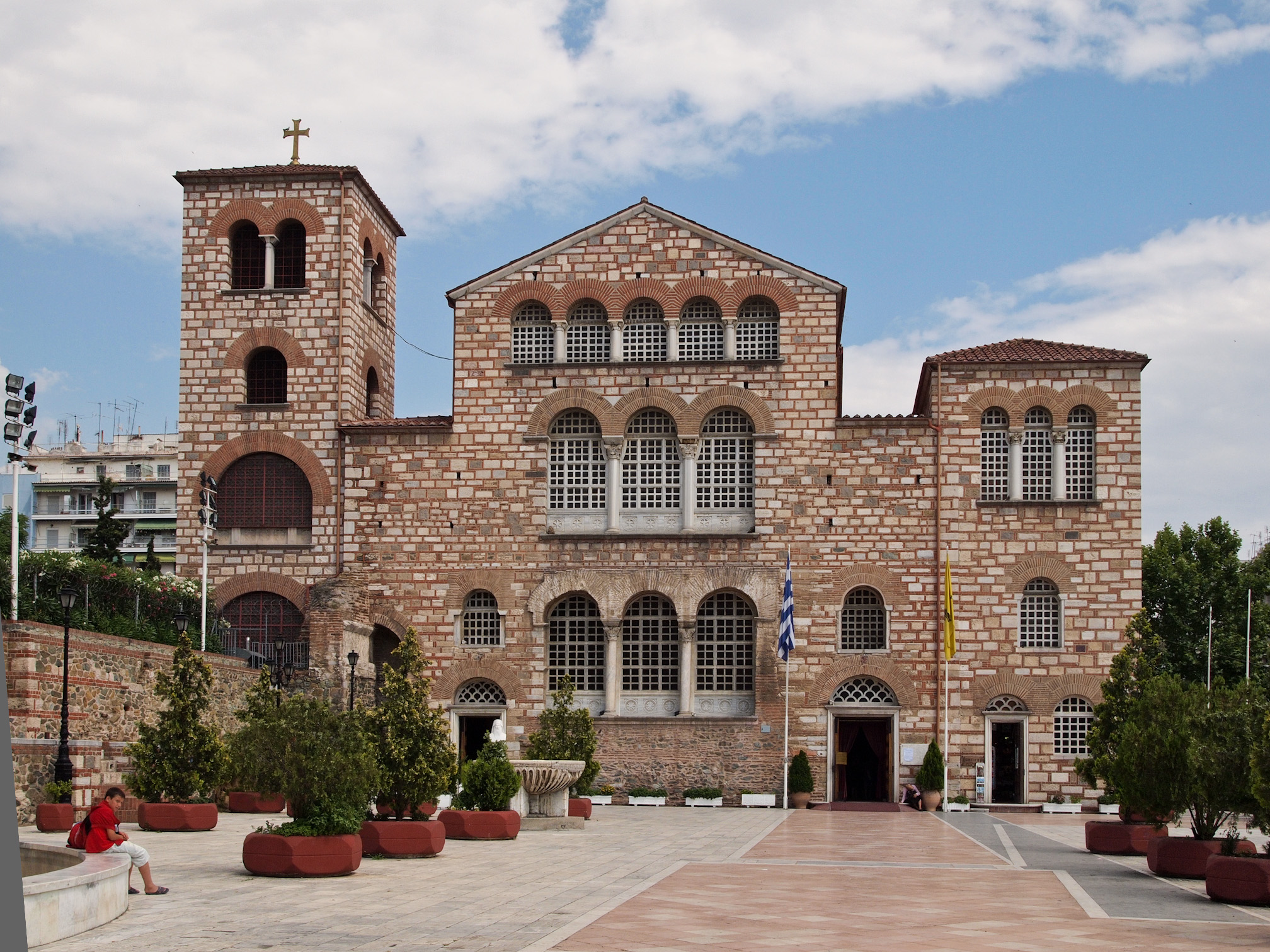
Hagios Demetrios

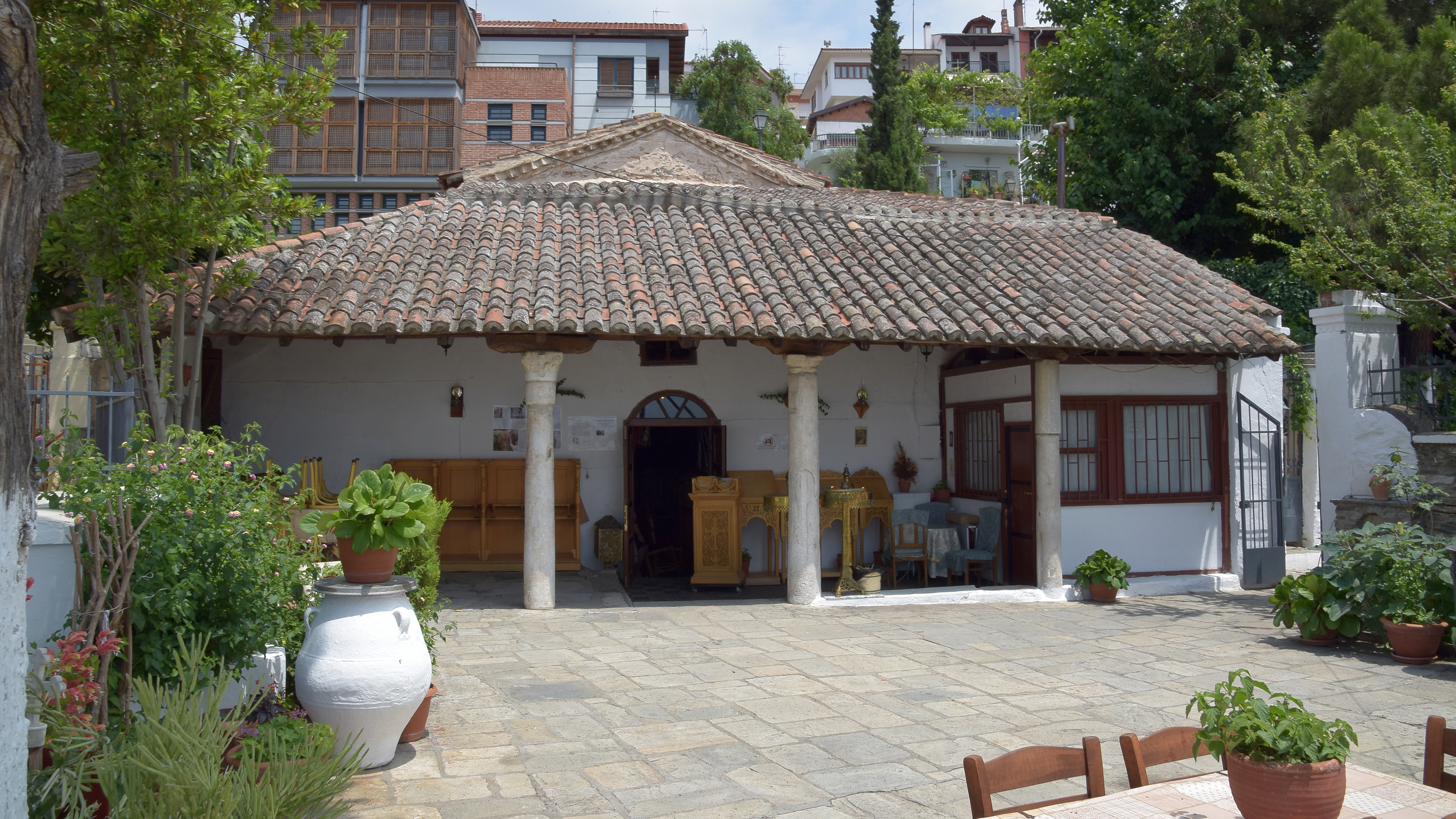
Latomou Monastery

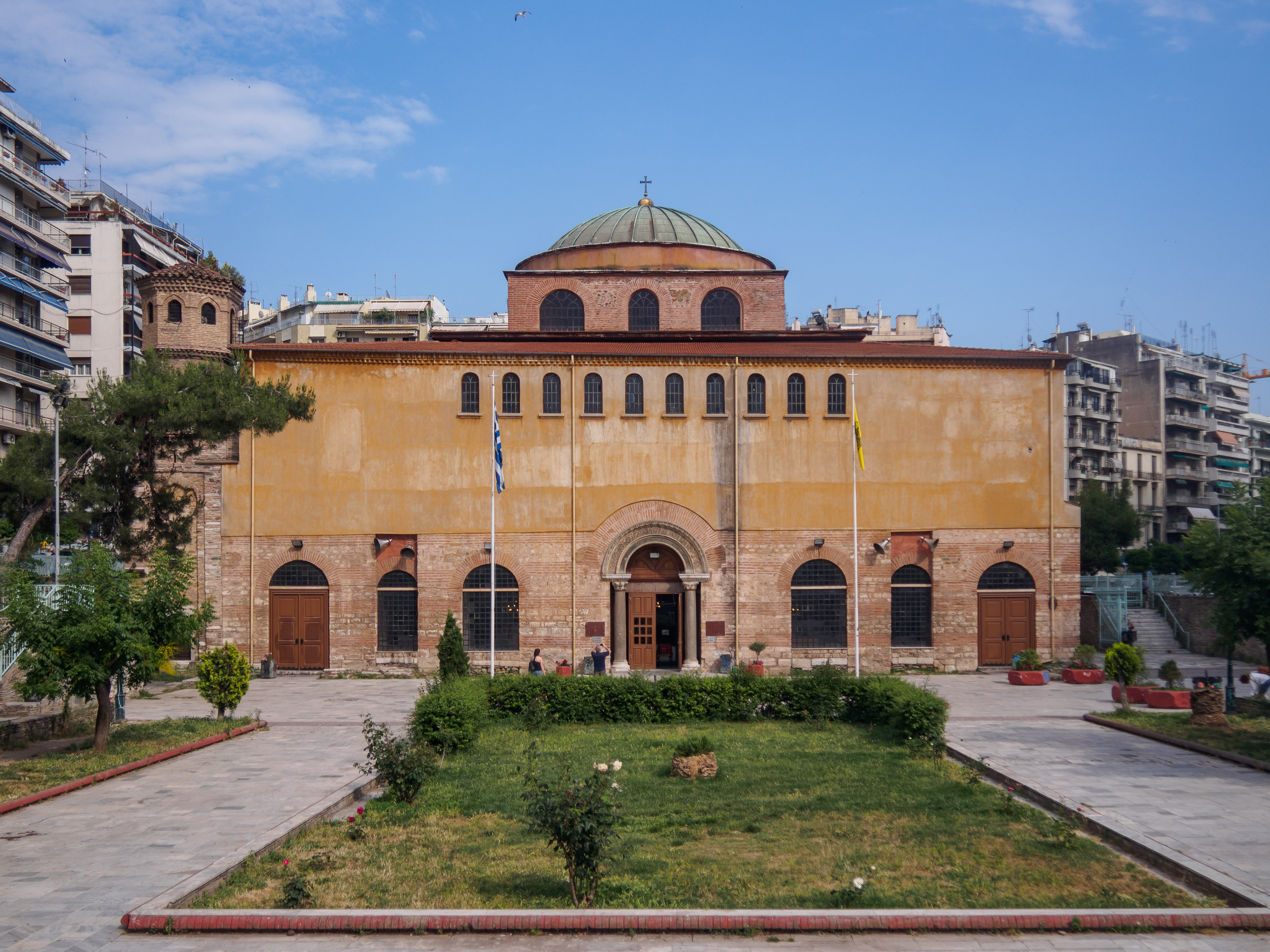
Church of Hagia Sophia

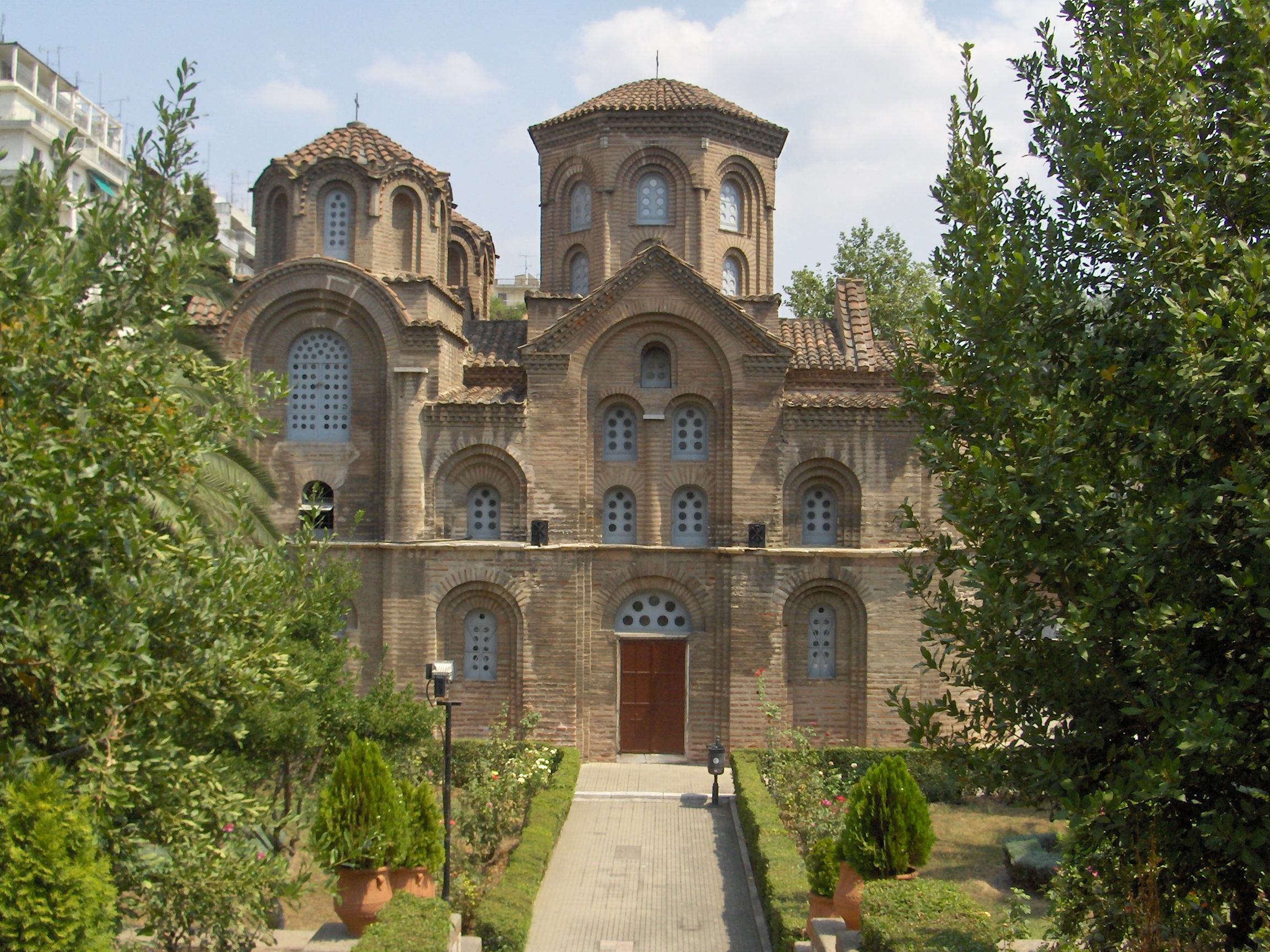
Church of Panagia Chalkeon

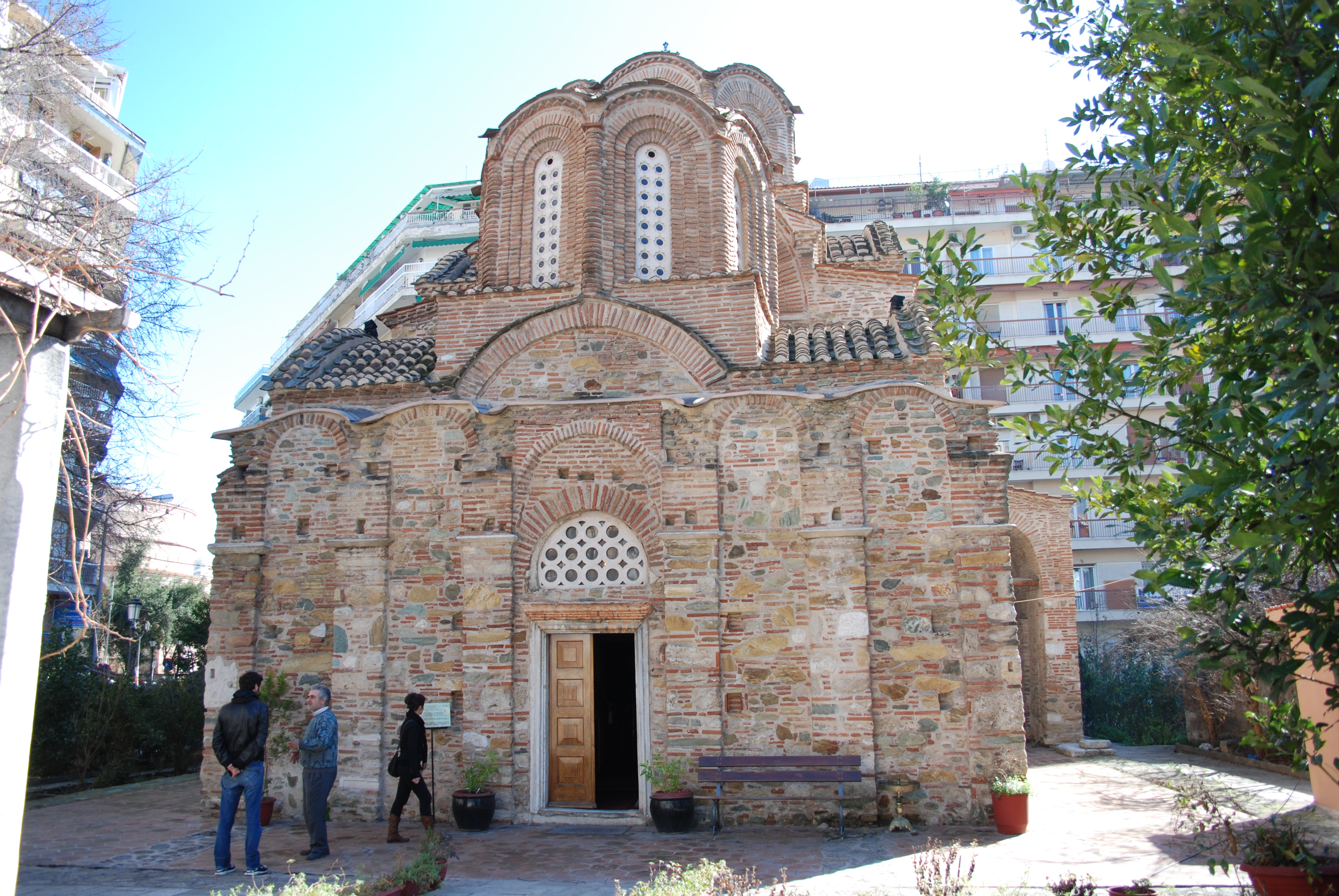
Church of Saint Panteleimon

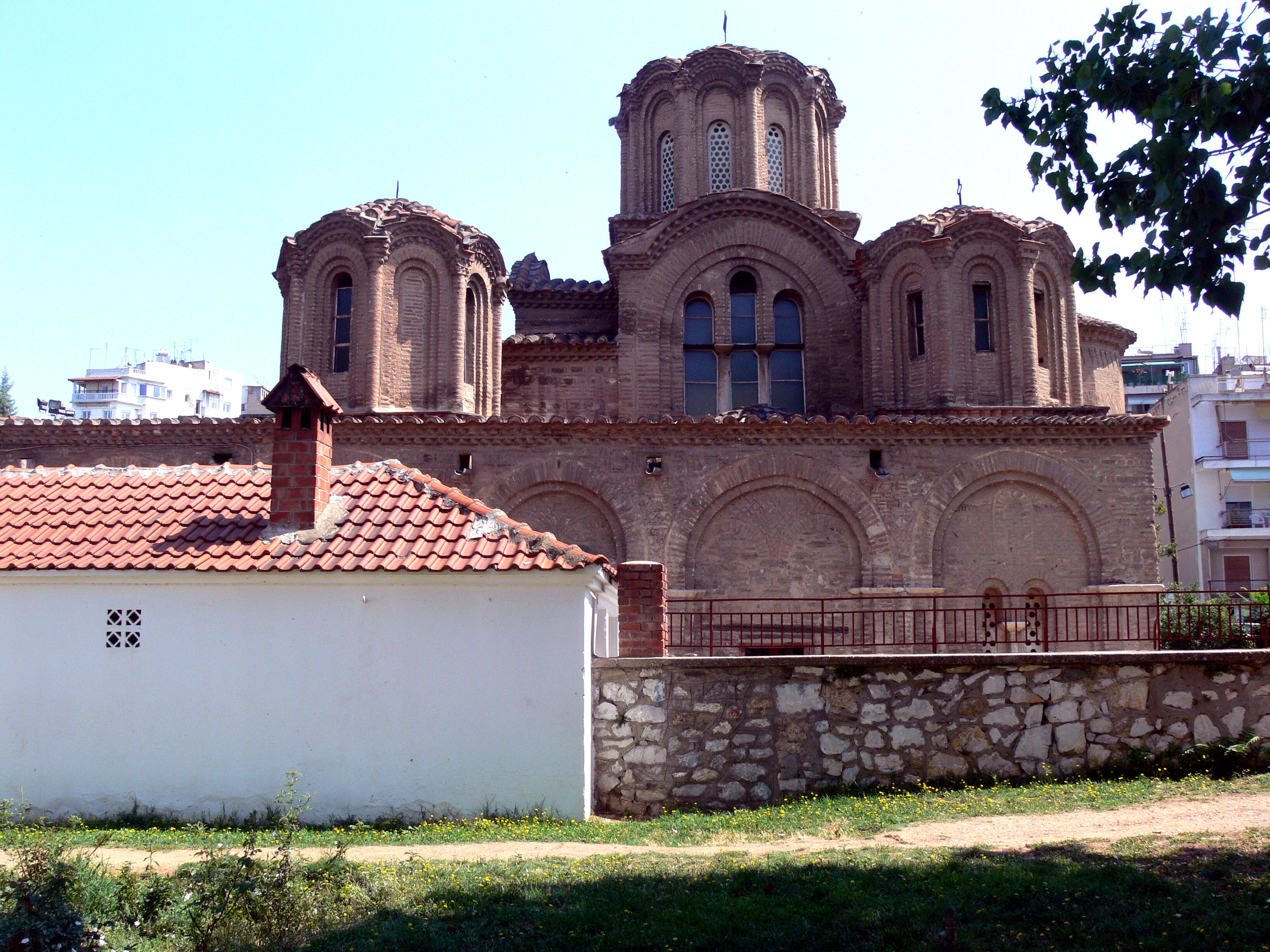
Church of the Holy Apostles

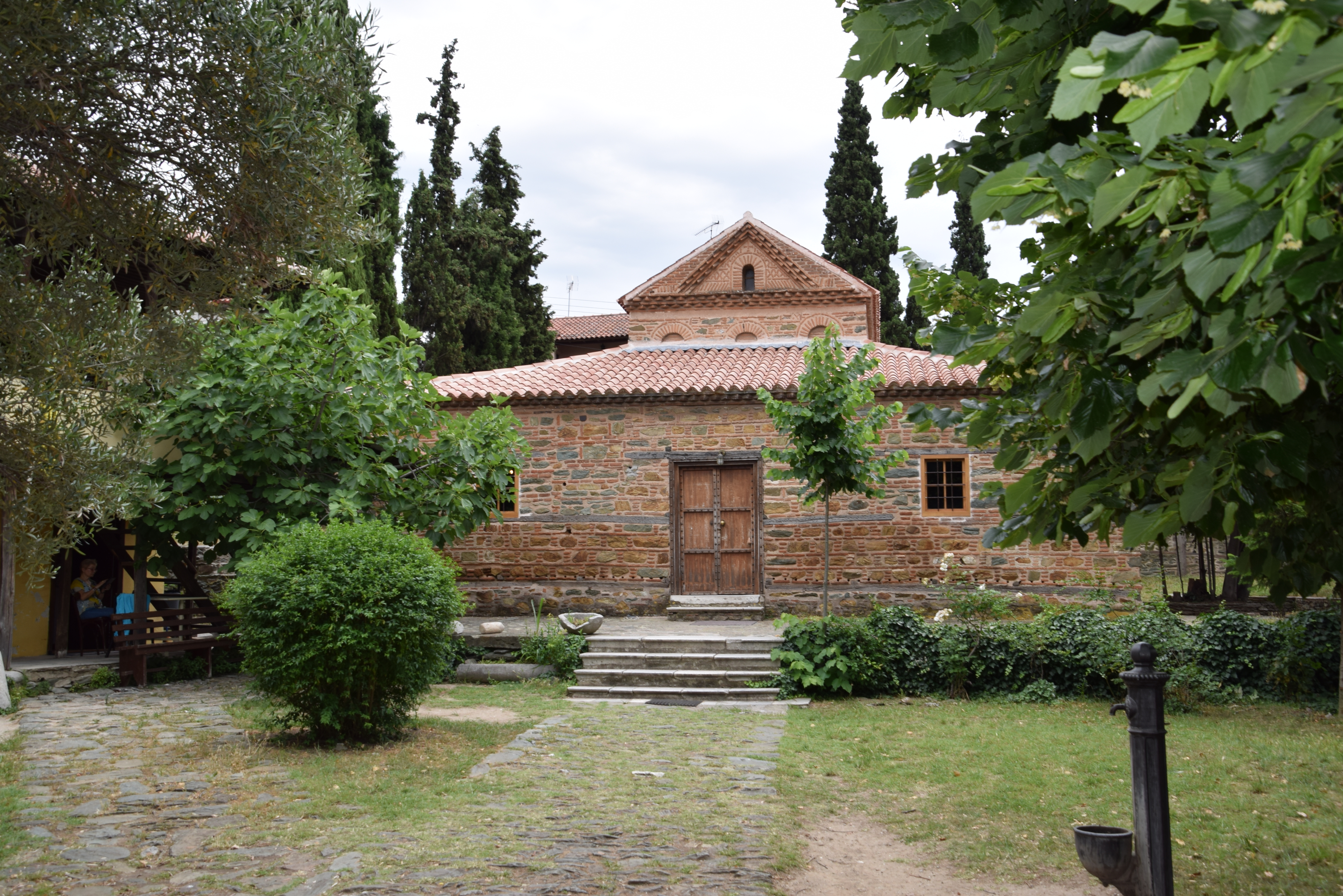
Church of St. Nicholas Orphanos

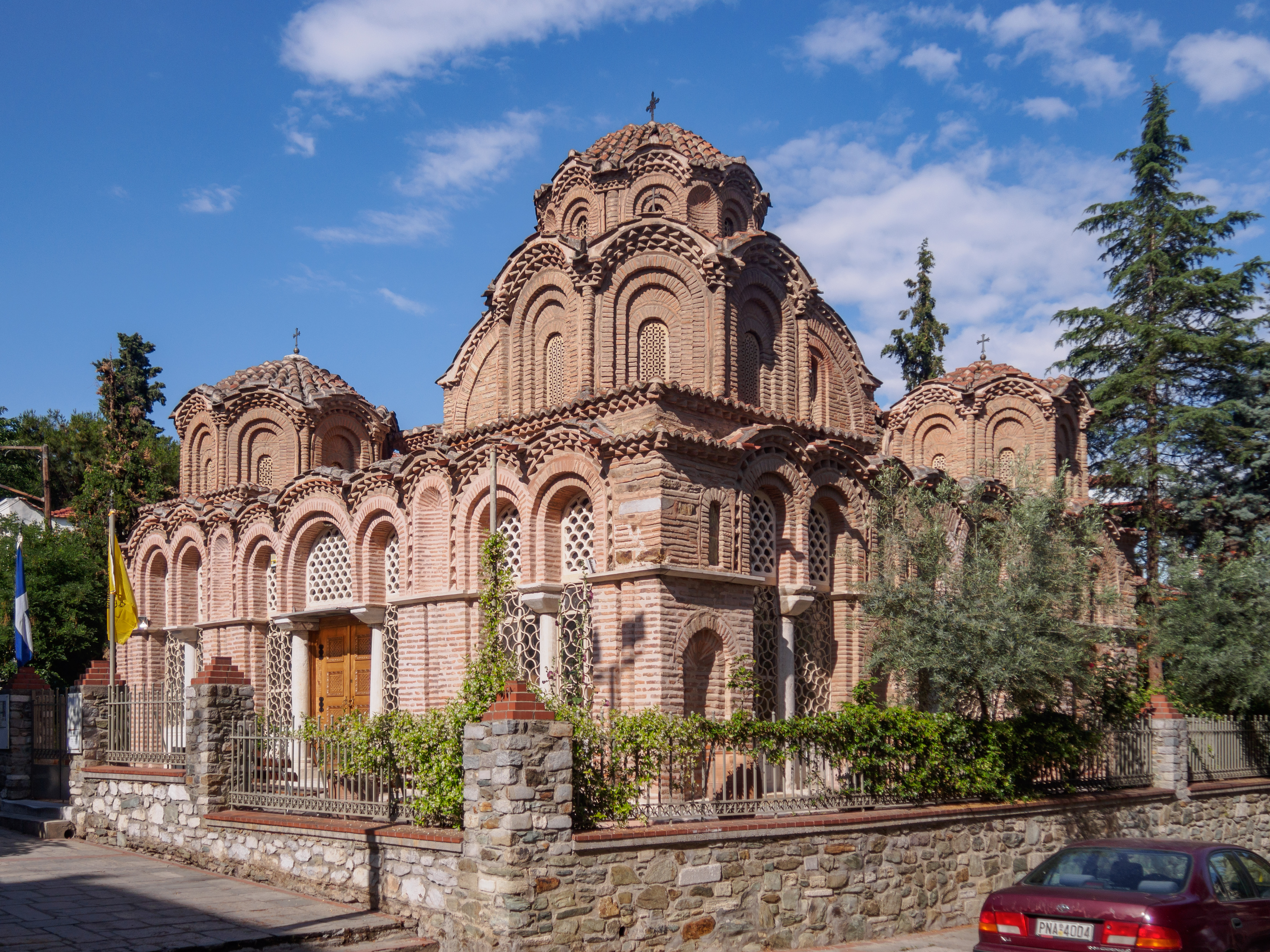
Church of Saint Catherine

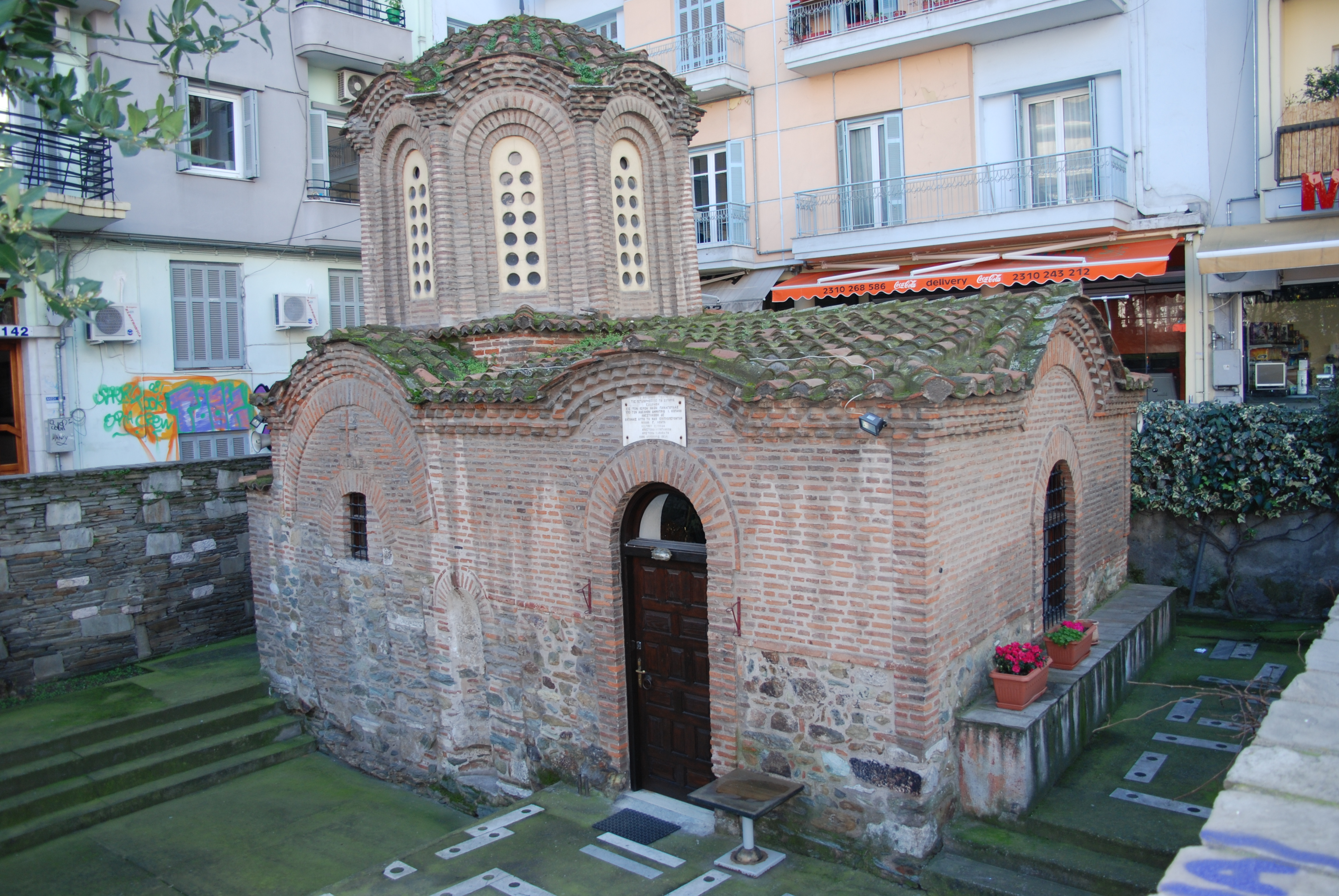
Church of the Saviour, Thessaloniki

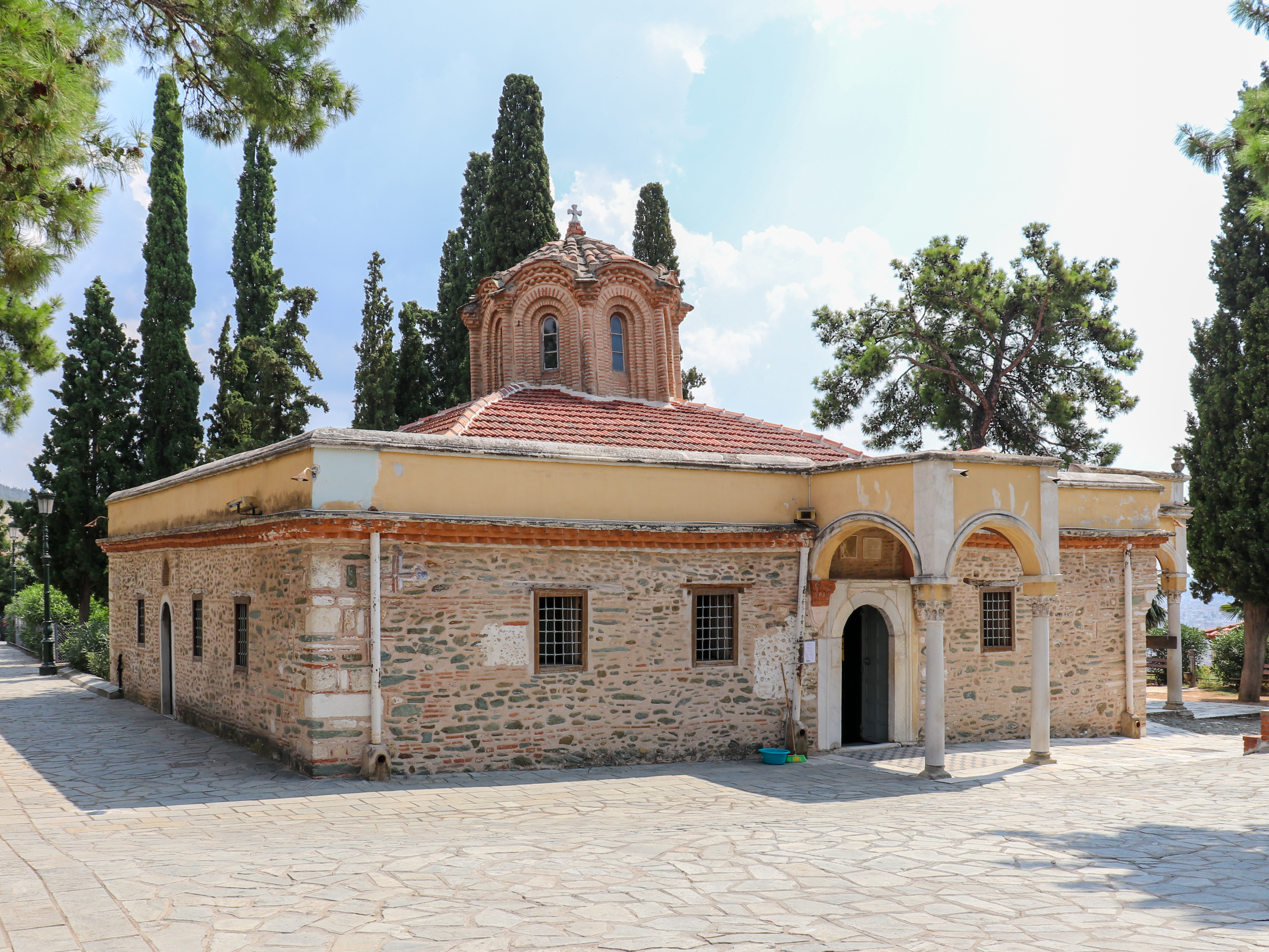
Vlatades Monastery

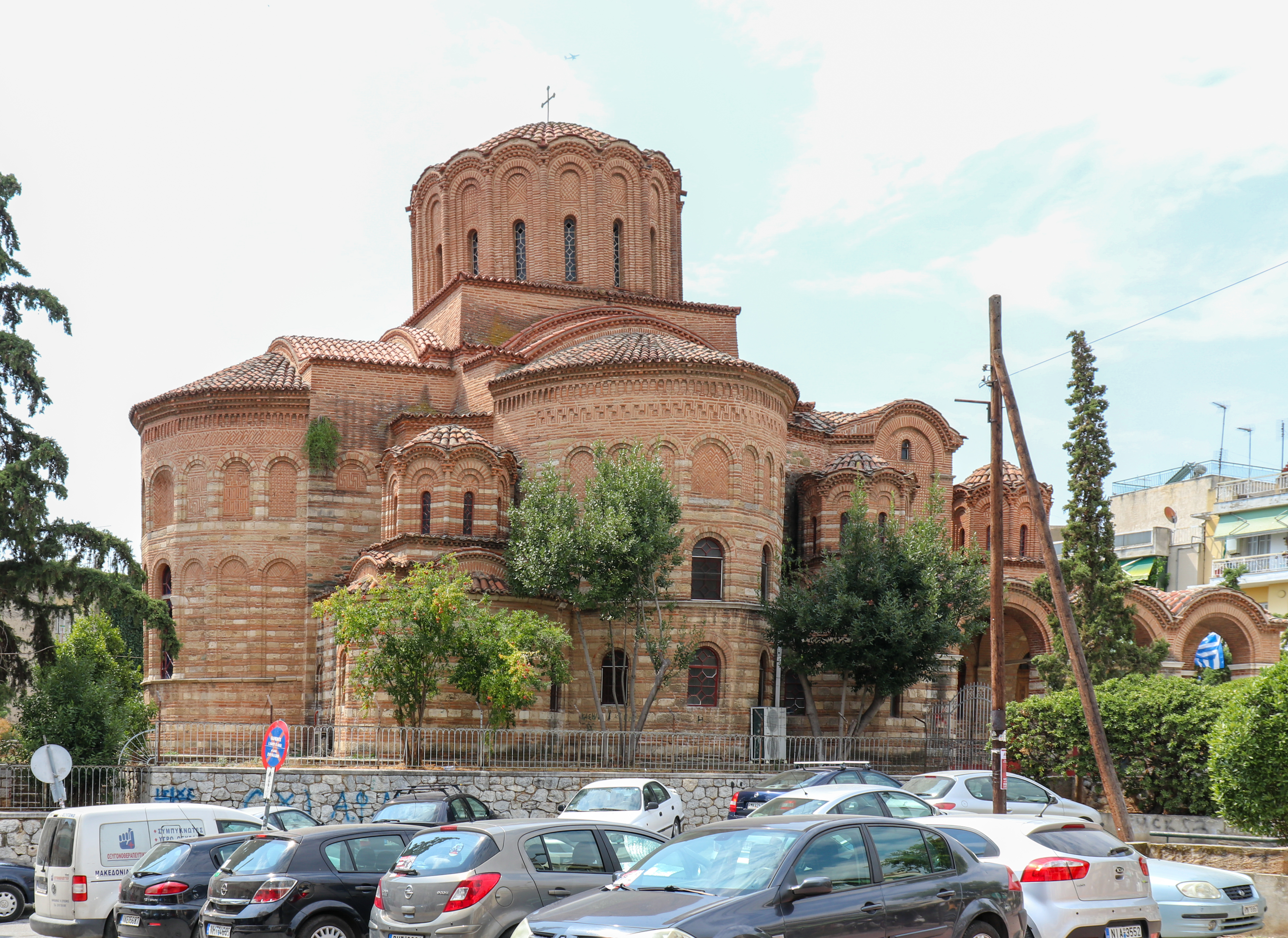
Church of Prophet Elijah

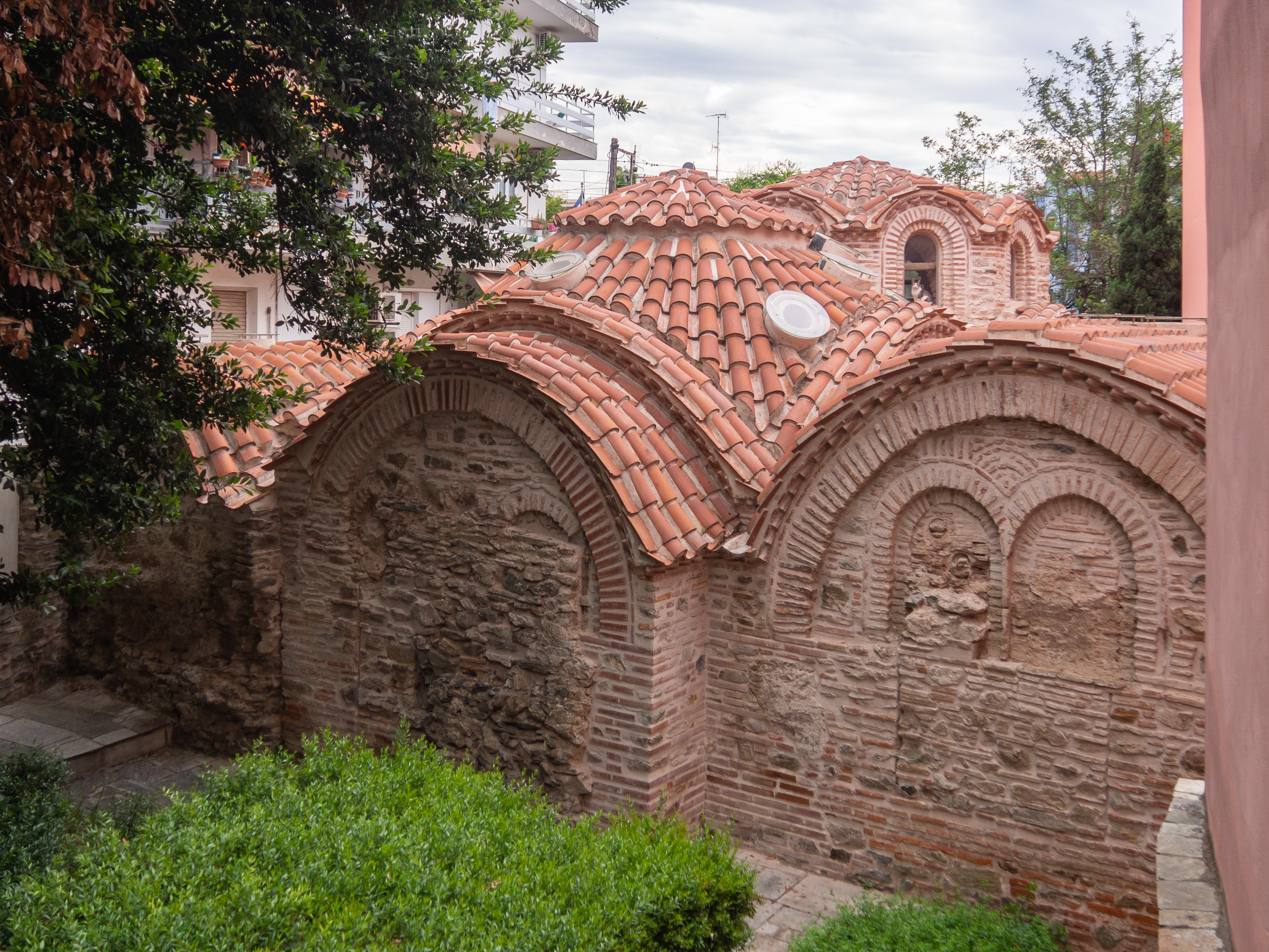
Byzantine Bath
