= Church of the Holy Apostles, Thessaloniki =

Church and heritage site in Thessaloniki, Greece

Church of the Holy Apostles
- Ἅγιοι Ἀπόστολοι
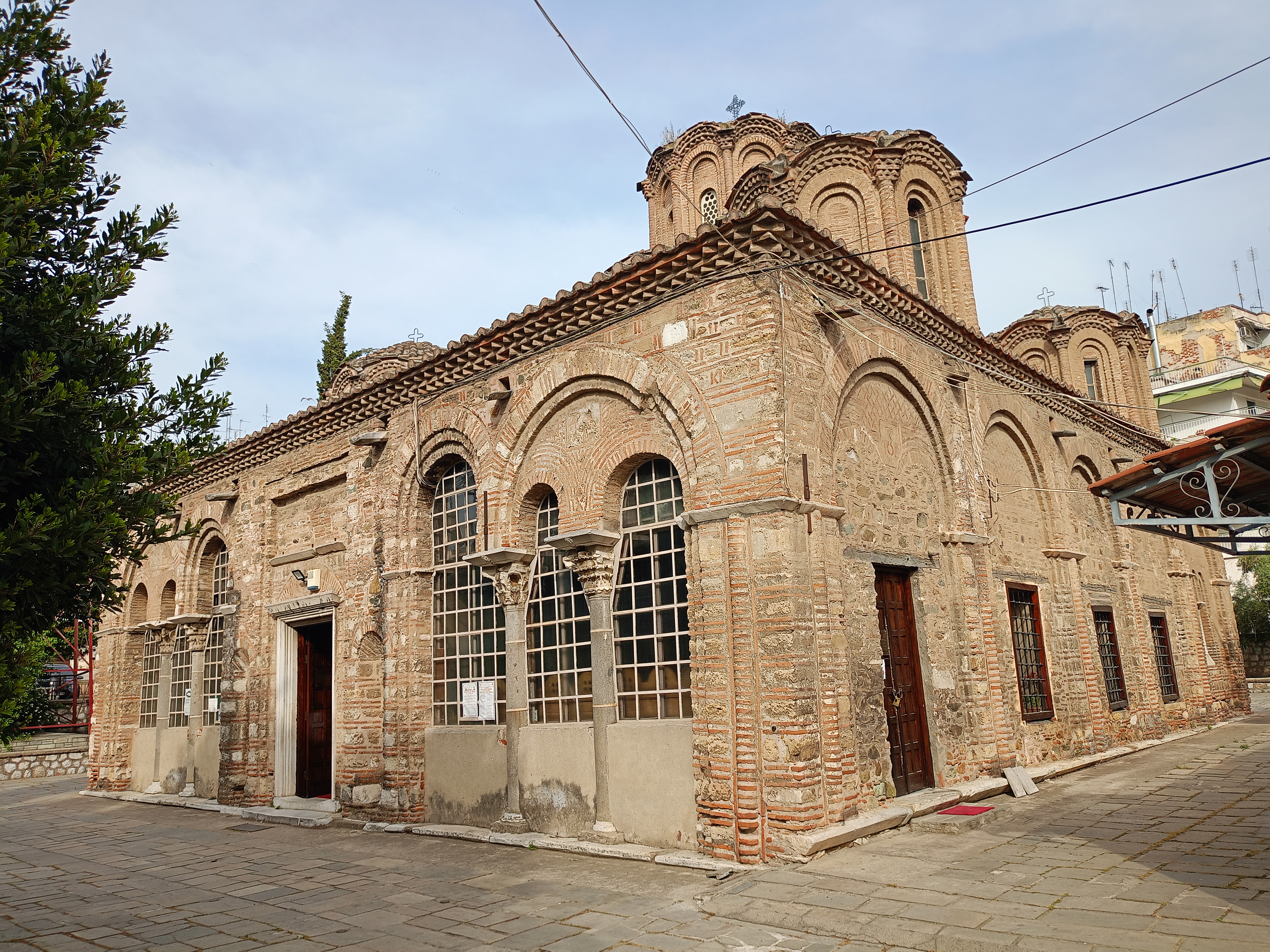
- Exterior of the church in 2024

- Location of the church in Greece
- Church of the Holy Apostles
- 40°38′34″N 22°56′15″E
- Location: Olympou Street, Thessaloniki, Central Macedonia
- Country: Greece
- Language: Greek
- Denomination: Greek Orthodox
- Previous denomination: Islam (c. 1530–1912)

History
- Former names: Monastery of Theotokos Gorgoepikoos; Turkish: Soğuksu Camii (as a mosque)
- Status: Katholikon (c. 1329–c. 1530); Mosque (c. 1530–1912); Church (since 1912– )
- Dedication: The Twelve Apostles

Architecture
- Functional status: Active
- Architectural type: Monastery
- Style: Byzantine
- Completed: c. 1329

Administration
- Province: Ecumenical Patriarchate of Constantinople
- Metropolis: Thessaloniki

Clergy
- Priest: Fr. Vasilios Tsiloglanidis
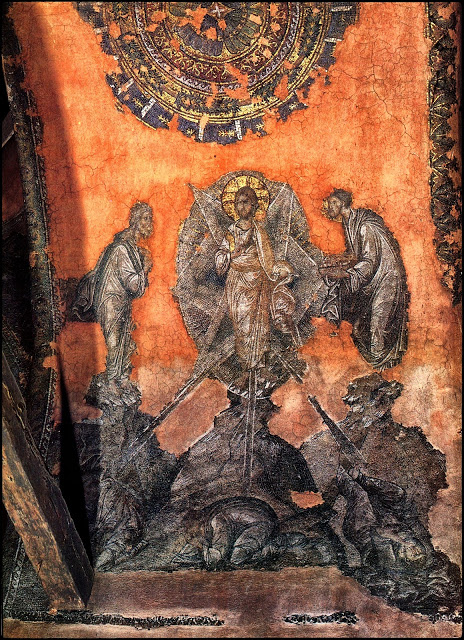
- 14th-century mosaic inside the church

UNESCO World Heritage Site
- Part of: Paleochristian and Byzantine monuments of Thessaloniki
- Criteria: Cultural: (i), (ii), (iv)
- Reference: 456-009
- Inscription: 1988 (12th Session)
- Area: 0.16 ha (0.40 acres)

The Church of the Holy Apostles (Greek: Ἅγιοι Ἀπόστολοι) is a 14th-century Byzantine-era Greek Orthodox church in the city of Thessaloniki, in the Central Macedonia region of northern Greece. Because of its outstanding Byzantine mosaics and architecture, and its testimony to the importance of Thessaloniki in early and medieval Christianity, the church is one of fifteen structures inscribed on the UNESCO World Heritage List as the Paleochristian and Byzantine monuments of Thessaloniki.

The church is located at the start of Olympou Street, near the city's western medieval walls; was converted to a mosque in the 16th century, during the Ottoman era, and subsequently reconsecrated as a church in the 20th century.

== History and description ==
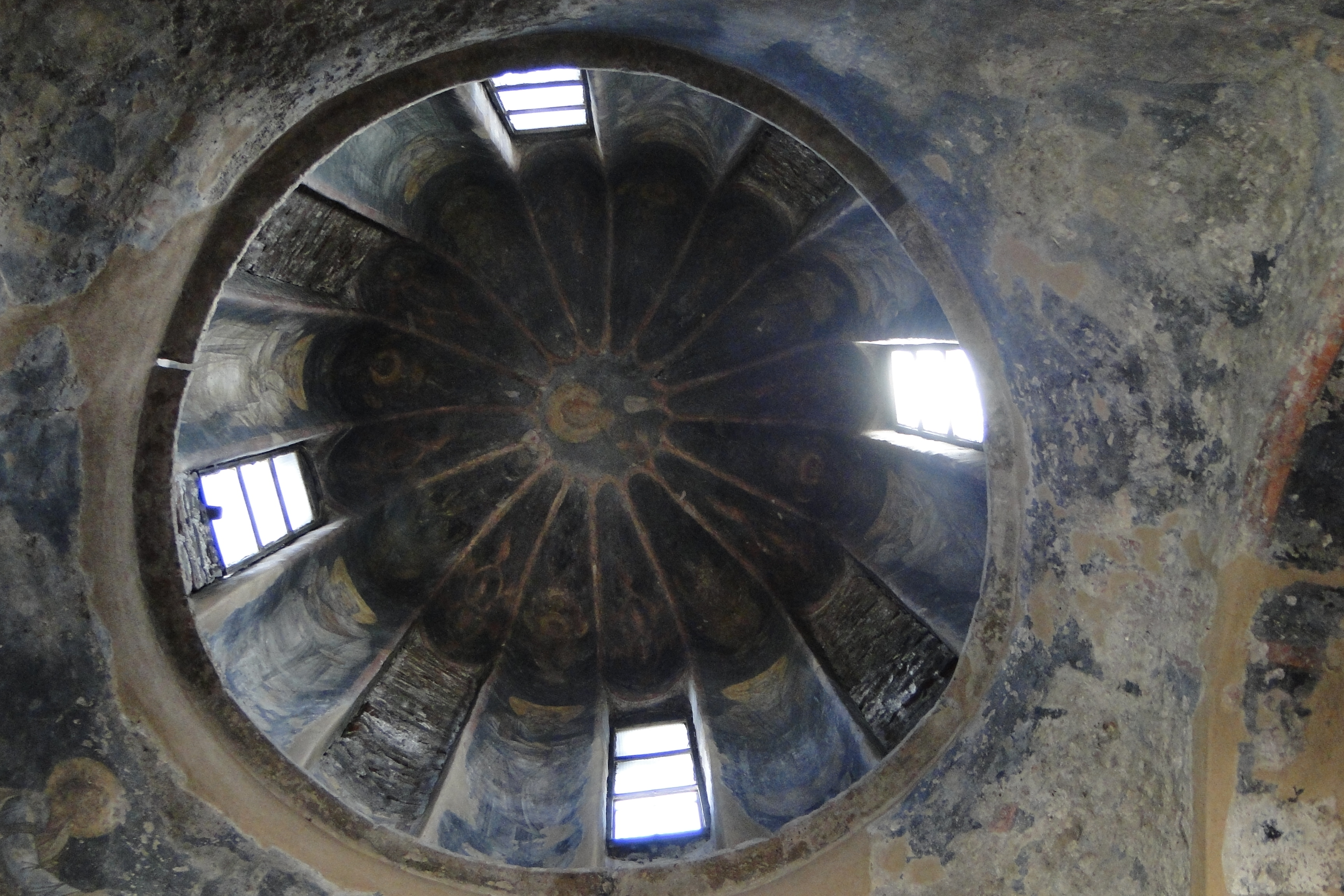
Southern dome

As evidenced by remnants of a column to the south of the church and a cistern to its northwest, it originally formed part of a larger complex. Consequently, it appears that the church was originally built as the katholikon of a monastery.

The date of its construction is not entirely clear: the founder's inscription above the entrance, the monograms in the capitals and other inscriptions refer to Nephon I, Patriarch of Constantinople in 1310–1314, as the ktetor. Another inscription on the eastern wall commemorates the same patriarch and his pupil, the hegumenos Paul, as first and second ktetores respectively. Recent analysis using carbon-14 however points to a later date for the entire structure, c. 1329. A depiction of the hegumenos Paul kneeling before Mary, as well as a series of Marian scenes lead to the conclusion that the church was dedicated to Mary, perhaps to be identified with the Monastery of Theotokos Gorgoepikoos.

The building belongs to the type of the composite, five-domed cross-in-square churches, with four supporting columns. It also features a narthex with a U-shaped peristoon (an ambulatory with galleries), with small domes at each corner. There are also two small side-chapels to the east. The exterior walls feature rich decoration with a variety of brick-work patterns.

The interior gives a very vertical impression, as the ratio of height to width of the church's central bay is 5 to 1. The interior decoration consists of rich mosaics on the upper levels, inspired by Constantinopolitan models. These are particularly important as some of the last examples of Byzantine mosaics (and the last of their kind in Thessaloniki itself). Frescoes complete the decoration on the lower levels of the main church, but also on the narthex and one of the chapels. These too show influence from Constantinople, and were possibly executed by a workshop from the imperial capital, perhaps the same which decorated the Chora Church. They were probably carried out under the patronage of the hegumenos Paul, after 1314 or in the period 1328–1334.

With the conquest of the city by the Ottoman Turks, in c. 1520 – c. 1530 the church was converted into a mosque, named as Turkish: Soğuksu Camii, lit. 'Mosque of the Cold Water', attributed to the building in the 19th century. As was their usual practice, the Ottomans covered the mosaics and frescoes with plaster, after they removed the gold tesserae. A minaret was added to the southwest corner and a low wooden portico was added to its northern and western sides. The structure was reconsecrated as a church in 1912.

Restoration and the gradual revealing of the frescoes began in 1926. After the 1978 earthquake, the building was strengthened, and in 2002, the mosaics were restored.

== See also ==
- Ancient Roman and Byzantine domes
- Church of Greece – Autocephalous church of Eastern Orthodox Christianity
- Islam in Greece
- List of Eastern Orthodox church buildings in Greece
- List of former mosques in Greece
- Ottoman Greece – Period of Ottoman rule of Greece
