= Church of the Saviour, Thessaloniki =

14th-century Byzantine chapel in Greece

Coordinates: 40.632149°N 22.950904°E

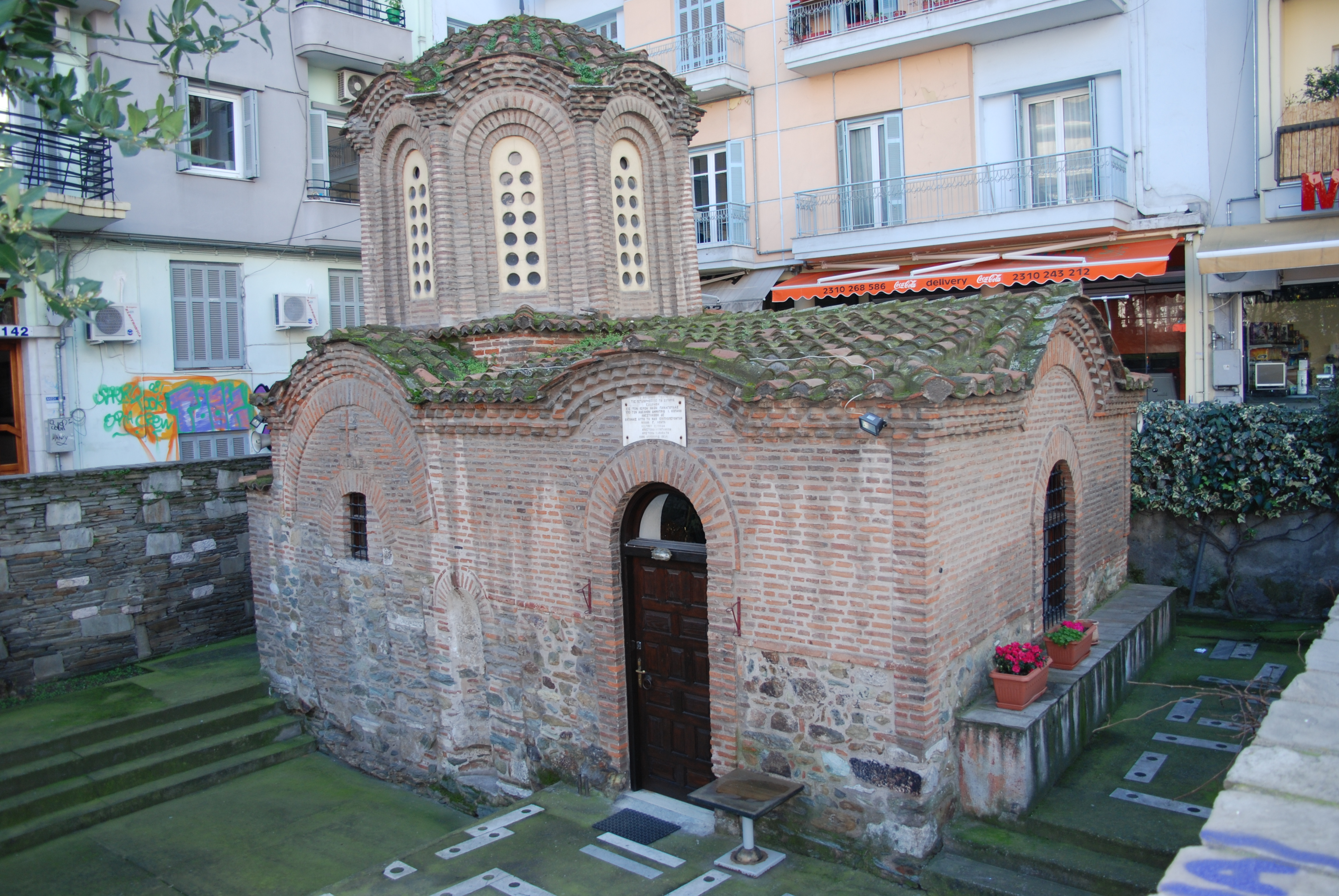
Church of the Transfiguration

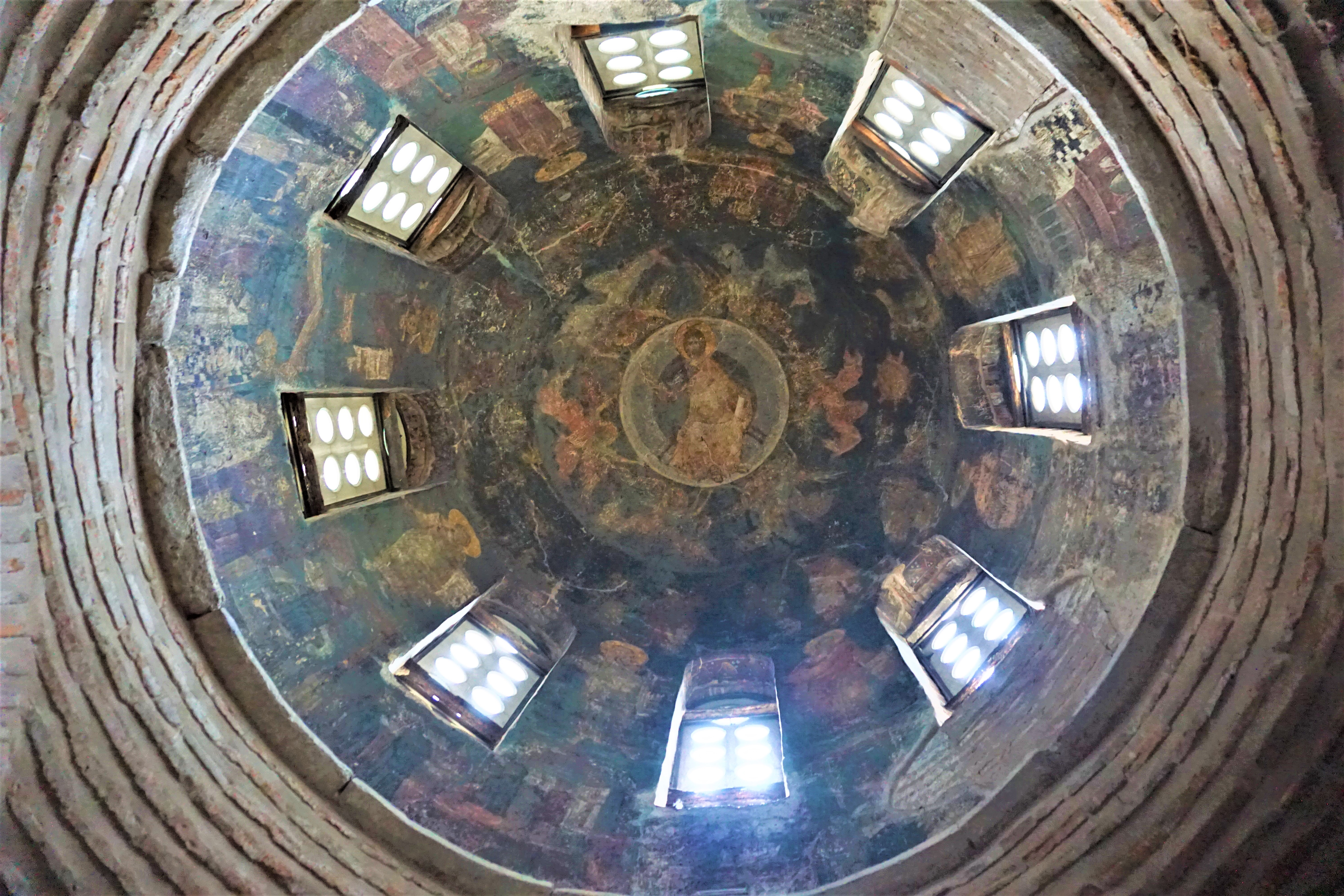
The dome

The Church of the Transfiguration of the Saviour (Greek: Ναός Μεταμορφώσεως του Σωτήρος, Naós Metamorphóseos tou Sotíros) is a 14th-century Byzantine chapel in Thessaloniki, Greece. It is a UNESCO World Heritage Site as one of the Paleochristian and Byzantine monuments of Thessaloniki.

== History ==
The church has been dated to about 1350, based on a coin found within its dome during archaeological investigations and restoration work following the 1978 Thessaloniki earthquake.

== Construction and furnishings ==
The lower part of the chapel is made of unhewn stone, the upper part of brickwork. It consists of a central room in the form of a tetraconchos, inscribed in a square and vaulted by a dome on a comparatively high tambour structured by archivolts and half-columns.
