= Church of Prophet Elijah, Thessaloniki =

Church and heritage site in Thessaloniki, Greece

Church of Prophet Elijah
- Ναός Προφήτη Ηλία
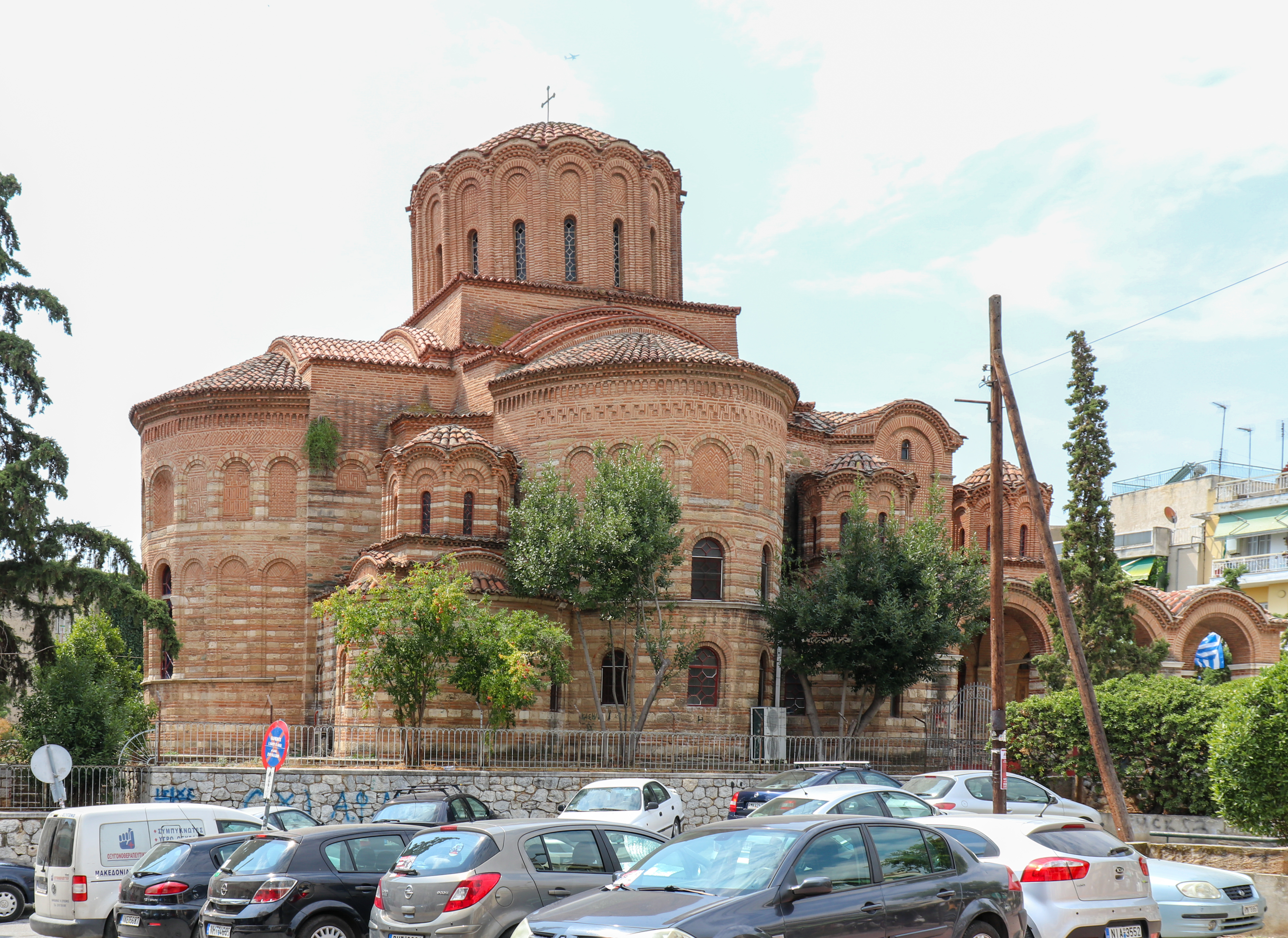
- Exterior of the church

- Location of the church in Greece
- Church of Prophet Elijah
- 40°38′27″N 22°56′54″E
- Location: Ano Poli, Thessaloniki, Central Macedonia
- Country: Greece
- Language: Greek
- Denomination: Greek Orthodox
- Previous denomination: Islam (1430–c. 1910s)

History
- Former names: Nea Moni Monastery; Akapniou Monastery; Saraylı Mosque (as a mosque)
- Status: Katholikon (c. 1370–1430); Mosque (1430–c. 1910s); Church (since c. 1910s– )
- Dedication: Elijah

Architecture
- Functional status: Active
- Architectural type: Athonite church
- Style: Byzantine
- Completed: c. 1360 – c. 1370

Specifications
- Materials: Bricks; white stone

Administration
- Metropolis: Thessaloniki

Clergy
- Priest: Hieromnk. Kosmadakis Filoumenos
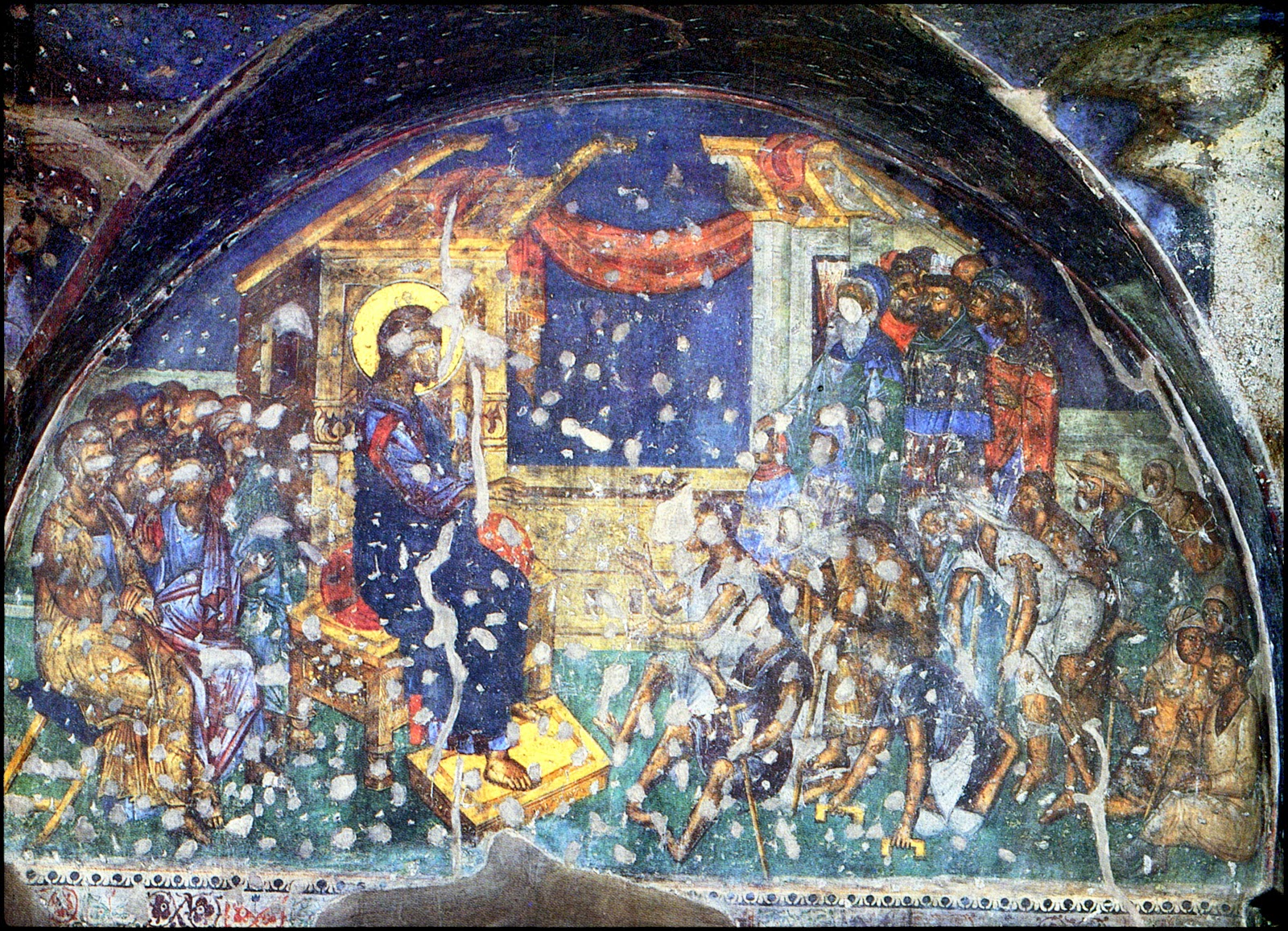
- A fresco inside the church

UNESCO World Heritage Site
- Part of: Paleochristian and Byzantine monuments of Thessaloniki
- Criteria: Cultural: (i), (ii), (iv)
- Reference: 456-014
- Inscription: 1988 (12th Session)
- Area: 0.198 ha (0.49 acres)

The Church of Prophet Elijah (Greek: Ναός Προφήτη Ηλία, romanized: Naós Profíti Ilía) is a 14th-century Byzantine-era Greek Orthodox church in the Ano Poli neighbourhood of the city of Thessaloniki, in the Central Macedonia region of northern Greece. Because of its outstanding Byzantine mosaics and architecture, and its testimony to the importance of Thessaloniki in early and medieval Christianity, the church is one of fifteen structures inscribed on the UNESCO World Heritage List as the Paleochristian and Byzantine monuments of Thessaloniki.

== Overview ==
The church is located in the upper quarter of the old city, and dates to the Palaiologan period, but its original dedication is unknown. In Ottoman times, it was known as the Saraylı Mosque (Palace Mosque or Court Mosque), and through a misinterpretation of this name came about its modern dedication to the Prophet Elijah. The structure was traditionally identified as the katholikon of the Nea Moni Monastery, built c. 1360 – c. 1370 on the site of a former palace destroyed in 1342 by the Zealot uprising. Modern research, however, has cast doubt on this identification, since the Nea Moni continued to operate well into the Ottoman period, while the church of Prophet Elijah was converted into a mosque by Badrah Mustafa Pasha immediately after the city's capture in 1430. On the basis of its internal decoration, it has been suggested that the church was the katholikon of the important Akapniou Monastery.

Its architectural style, a variant of cross-in-square church, known as the "Athonite" type, is unique in the city, and was always reserved for katholika of monasteries. The careful masonry, of alternating courses of bricks and white ashlar, is also unusual for Thessaloniki and its region; it is copied from Constantinopolitan architecture. Several of its architectural features have also been interpreted as set to create an ambient atmosphere directly connected with the type of worship, through the way natural light is distributed. Fragments of the church's original decoration survive in the form of wall paintings, fine examples of late-Palaiologan art, which influenced later paintings in Serbia.

== See also ==
- Ancient Roman and Byzantine domes
- Islam in Greece
- List of Eastern Orthodox church buildings in Greece
- List of former mosques in Greece
- Ottoman Greece – Period of Ottoman rule of Greece
