= Church of St. Nicholas Orphanos =

UNESCO World Heritage Site
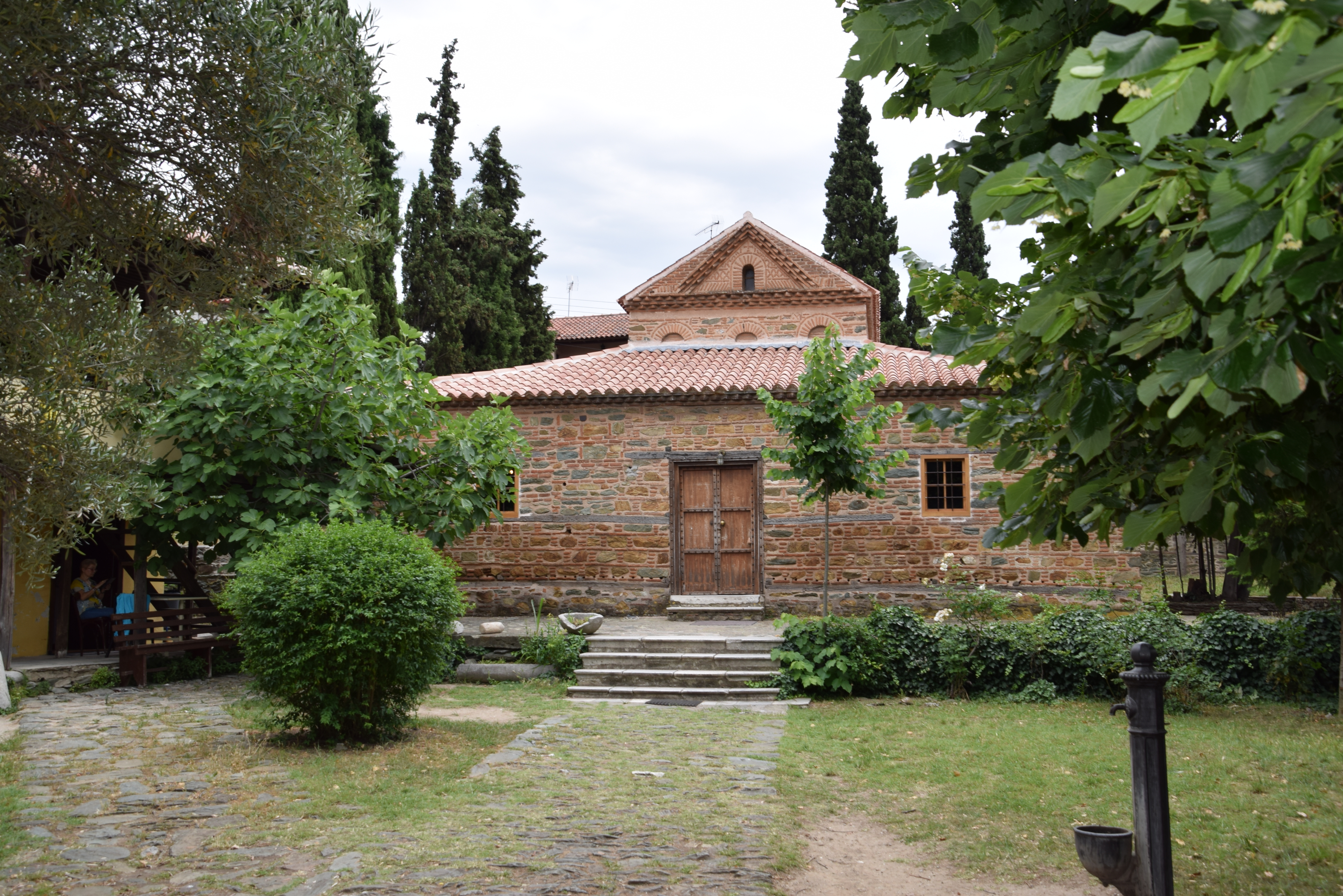
- The Church of Saint Nicholas Orphanos

- Location within Greece
- Location: Thessaloniki, Macedonia, Greece
- Part of: Paleochristian and Byzantine monuments of Thessaloniki
- Criteria: Cultural: (i), (ii), (iv)
- Reference: 456-010
- Inscription: 1988 (12th Session)
- Area: 0.227 ha (0.56 acres)
- Coordinates: 40°38′15.5″N 22°57′22″E

The Church of Saint Nicholas Orphanos (Greek: Ἅγιος Νικόλαος ὁ Ὀρφανός) is an early 14th-century Byzantine church in the northern Greek city of Thessaloniki. Covered in outstanding Byzantine frescoes, the church is inscribed on the UNESCO World Heritage List along with other Paleochristian and Byzantine monuments of Thessaloniki, demonstrating the importance of Thessaloniki in early Christian history.

== Location ==
The church is located in the northeastern corner of the old city, just inside the eastern wall, between the Irodotou and Apostolou Pavlou streets.

== History and description ==
The church's name, "Saint Nicholas the Orphan", is first attested in the 17th and 18th centuries, and presumably refers to its otherwise unknown ktetor (founder). From its interior decoration, the building is dated to the period 1310–1320. The church originally formed part of a monastery, traces of which (remnants of a gate) survive to the east. The church is most notable for its frescoes, contemporary with the church's construction, which cover almost the entire interior surface. The frescoes are an example of the Thessalonican school at the height of the "Palaiologan Renaissance", and their creator may be the same who decorated the Hilandar Monastery in Mount Athos in 1314. The church has been linked to the Serbian king Stephen Uroš II Milutin (r. 1282–1321), who is known to have sponsored churches in the city, on account of the depiction in the main aisle of St George Gorgos, the Serbian ruler's patron saint, and of St. Clemens of Ohrid, a favourite motif of the Serbian churches.

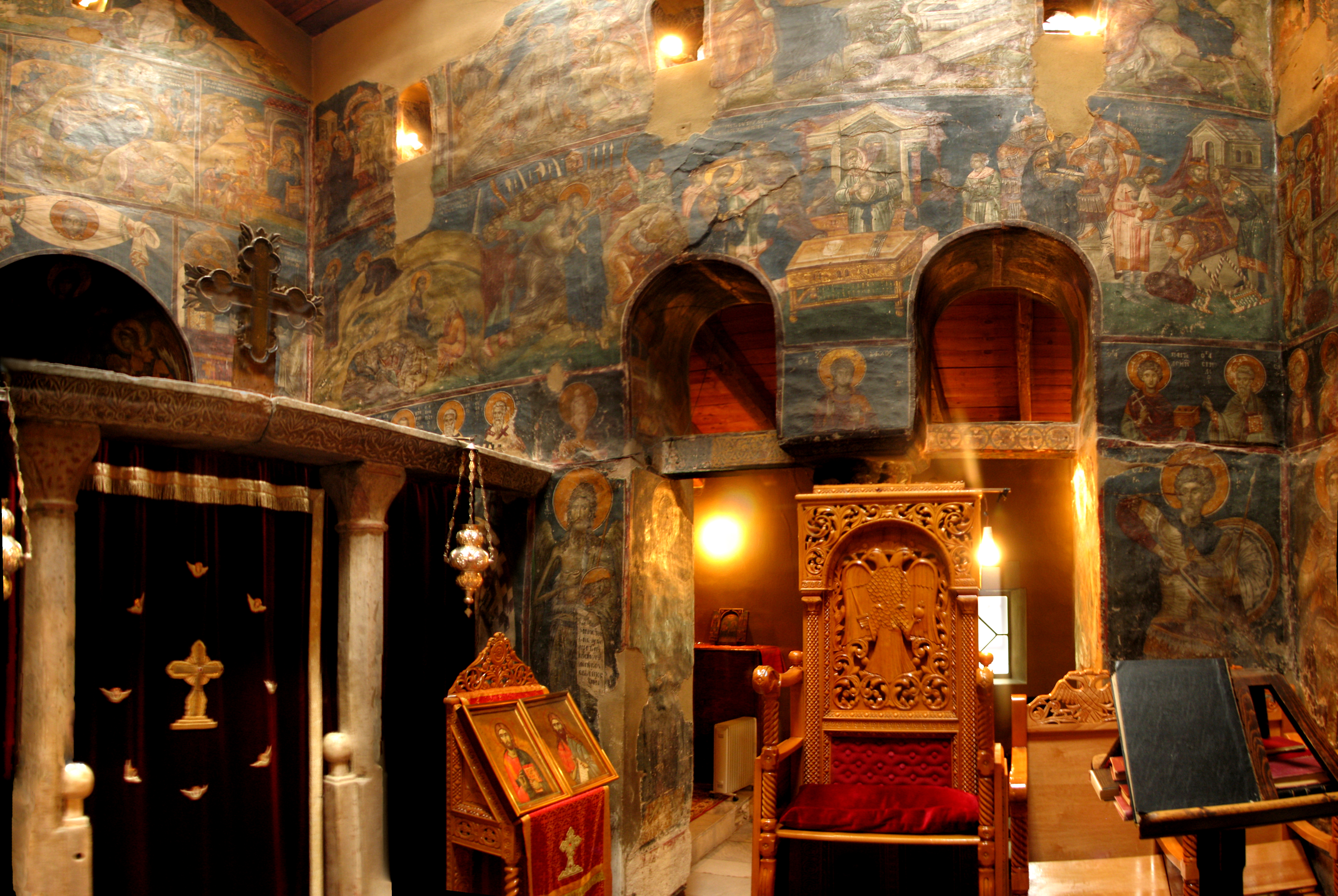
Interior view of the church with the well preserved frescoes

The church was originally built as a simple, single-aisled edifice with a wooden gabled roof. Later, aisles were added on three sides. They form an ambulatory, under whose floor several graves have been found. The masonry features irregular layers of brick and stone, with a few ceramics on the eastern side and brick decoration on the eastern and western sides. In the interior, the central aisle is connected to the others with double openings decorated with reused late antique capitals. The church's original marble templon survives.

The monastery continued functioning throughout the Ottoman period. The frescoes were uncovered in 1957–1960 during restoration works.

== Gallery ==
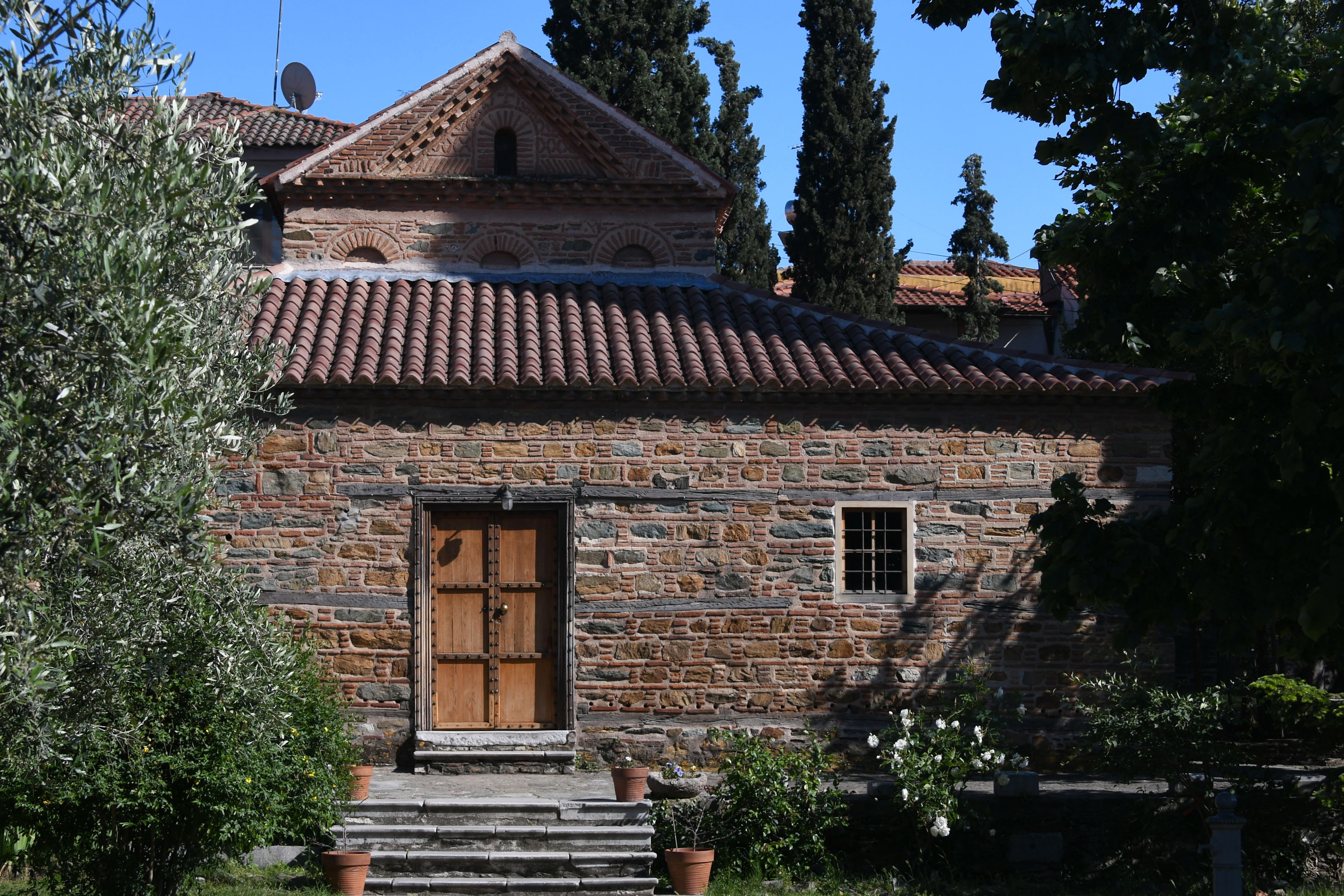
View

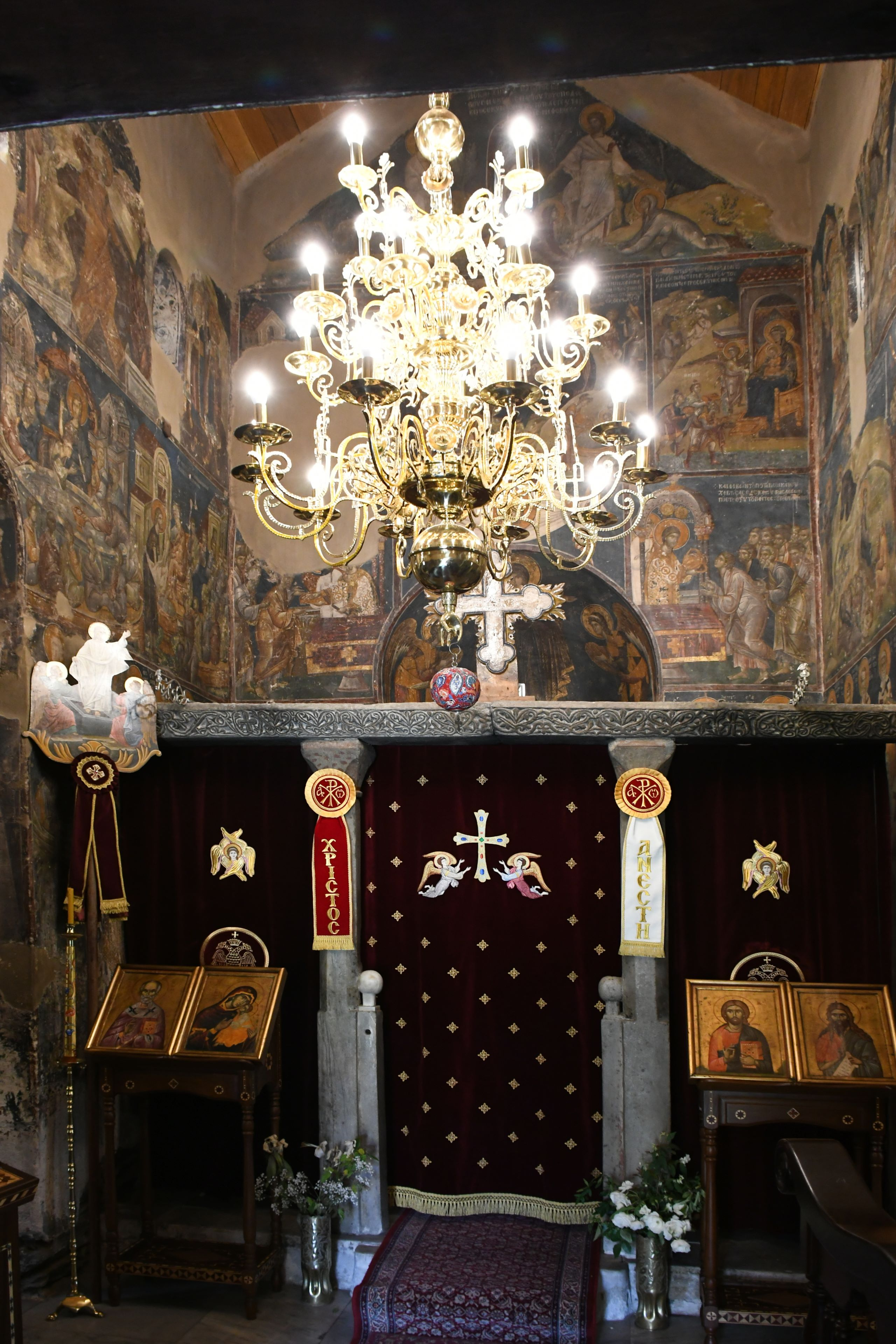
Interior

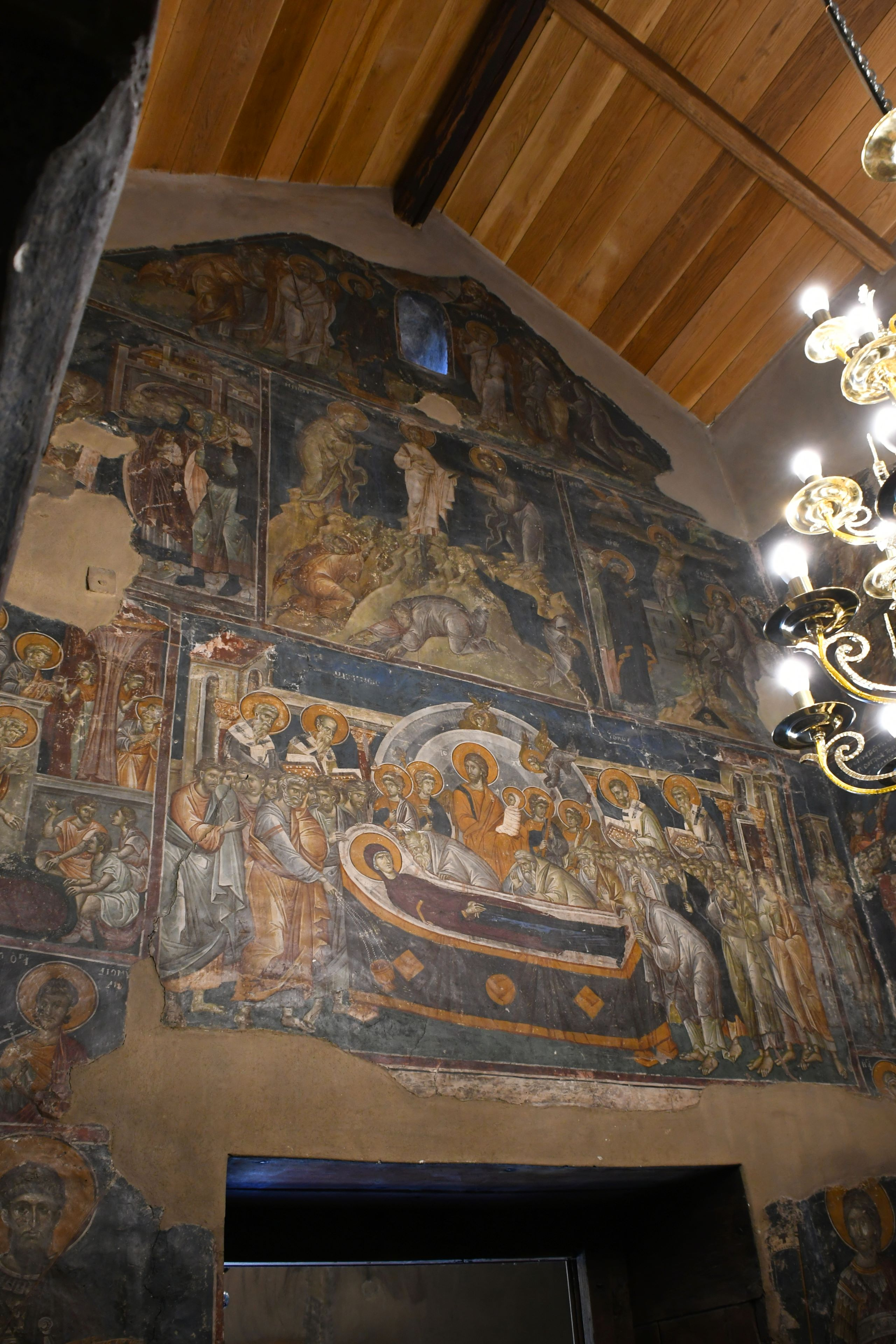
Frescoes

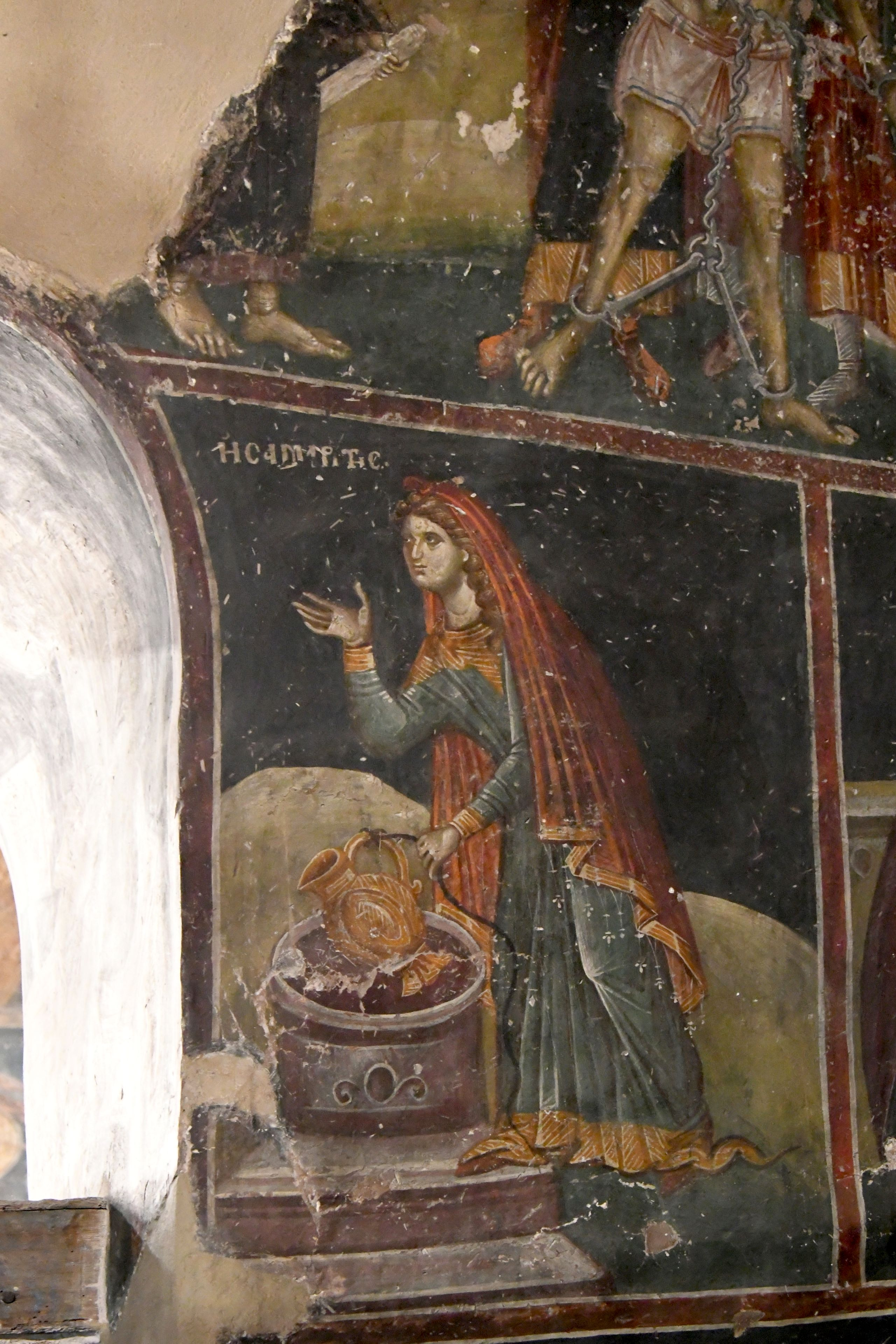
Fresco of Samaritan

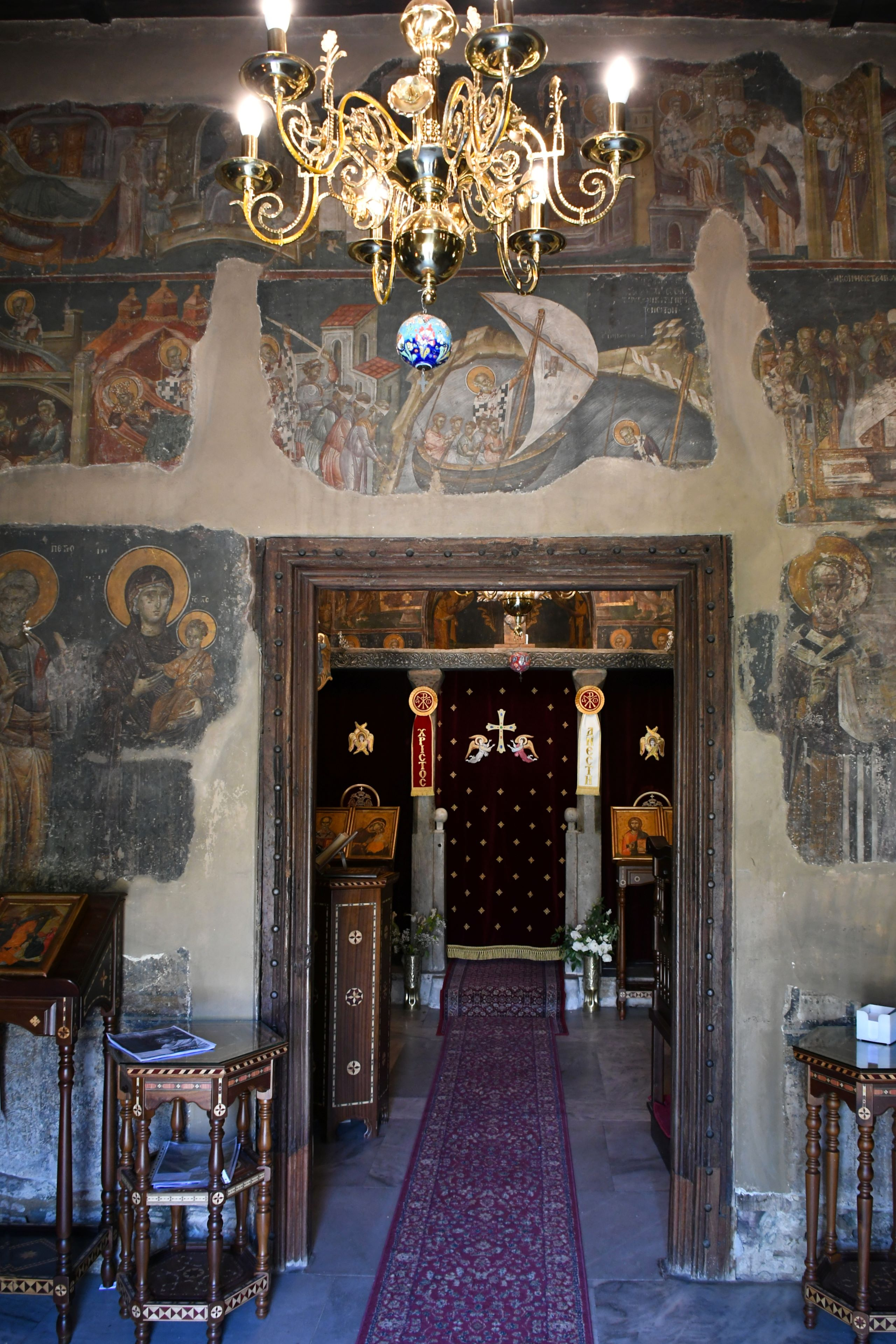
Interior

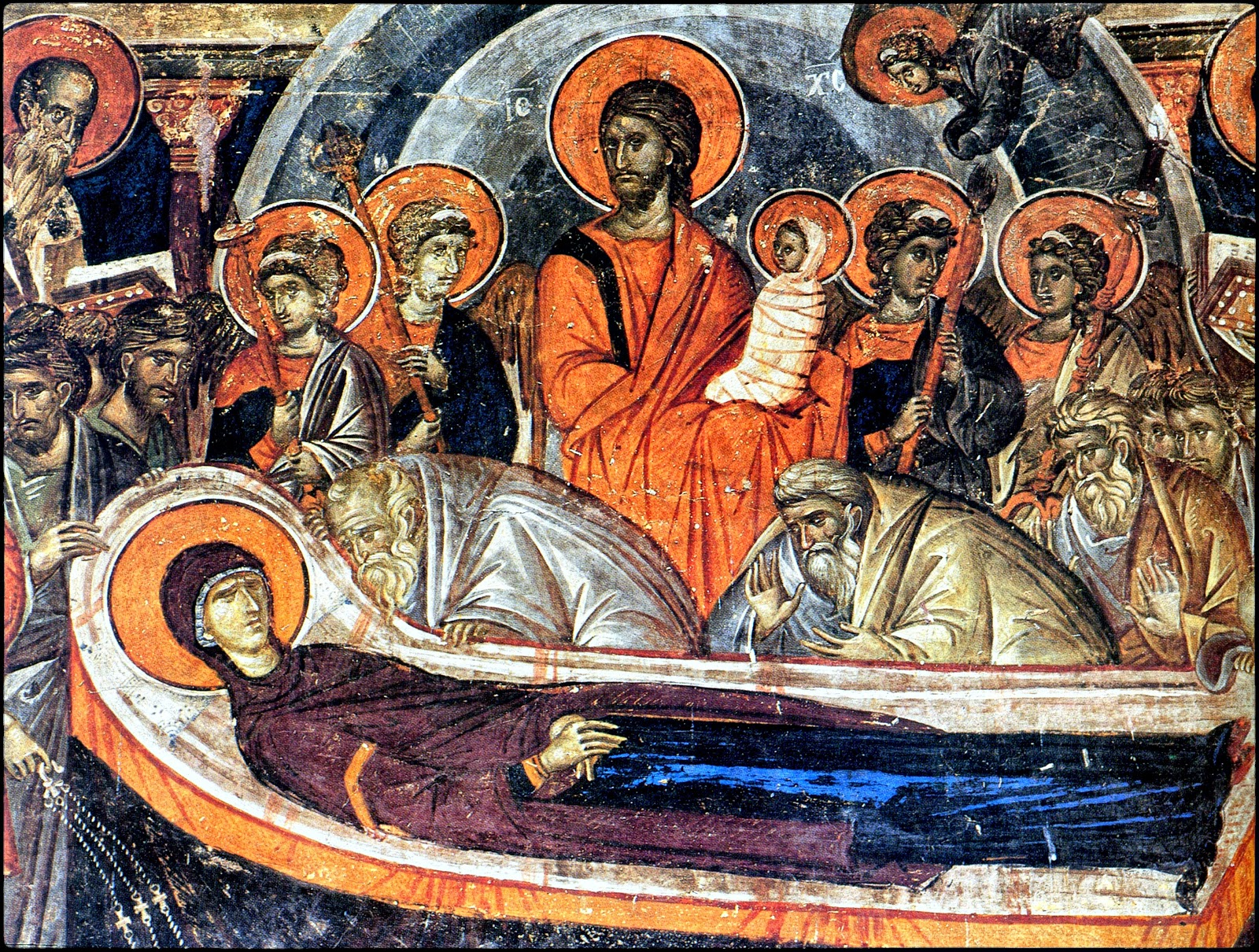
Adormition of Theotokos
