= Templon =

Nave–altar barrier in Byzantine churches

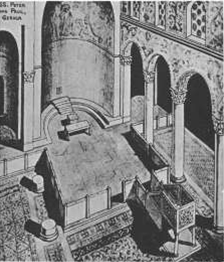
A reconstruction of the templon of St. Paul's and Peter's basilica in Jerash (ancient Gerasa)

A templon (from Greek τέμπλον meaning "temple", plural templa) is a feature of Byzantine churches consisting of a barrier separating the nave from the sanctuary near the altar.

The solid templon first appeared in Christian churches around the 5th century and is still found in many Eastern Christian churches. Initially it was a low barrier probably not much different from the altar rails of many Western churches. It eventually evolved into the modern iconostasis, still found in Orthodox churches.

It is usually composed of carved wood or marble colonnettes supporting an architrave (a beam resting on top of columns). Three doors, a large central one and two smaller flanking ones, lead into the sanctuary. The templon did not originally obscure the view of the altar, but as time passed, icons were hung from the beams, curtains were placed in between the colonnettes, and the templon became more opaque. In modern Orthodox churches, it is common for the openings of the templa to be constructed specifically to contain icons.

== Origins ==
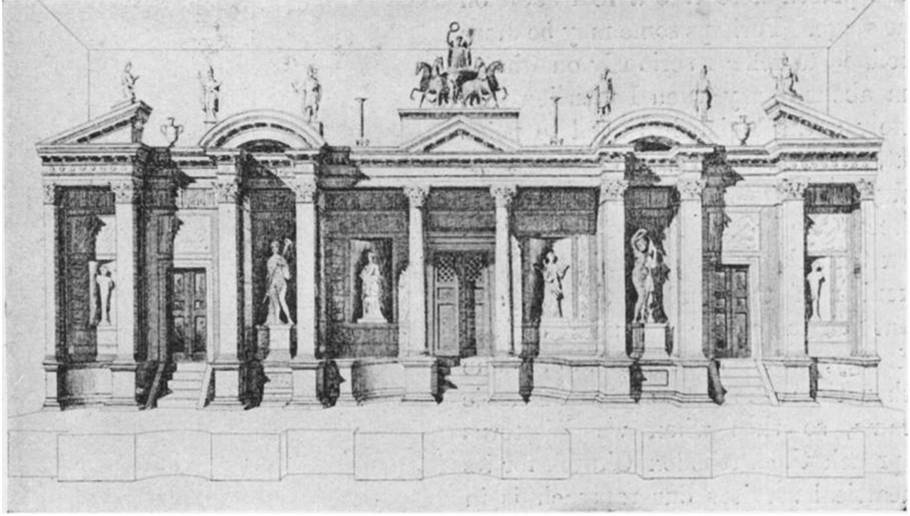
A Greek scaenae frons (theater screen) portraying a three-doored temple facade, posited in the early 20th century as a possible origin for the design of the templon.

The templon most likely has an independent origin from that of Latin chancel barriers. Classical stage architecture is one possible source. At certain times during Byzantine history, theater heavily influenced painting and sculpture. Architects then, influenced by stage backdrops dating back to Sophocles, consciously imitated the classical proskenion (Latin proscenium; the backdrop of a classical Greek stage), copying the multiple columns punctuated by a large door in the middle and two smaller doors to each side. The statues on top of the backdrop would thus be analogous to the icons of the saints looking down. The similarities, however, are probably only visual. Although classical drama was performed in Constantinople, the capital of the Byzantine Empire, during the 5th and 6th century when the first templa appear, when Christian liturgy was first being developed, the plays and their architecture had lost their importance and could not have influenced Christian ritual.

A much more plausible theory is that the templon models, in both form and content, the decorative wall of the Torah screen in Jewish synagogues of the 2nd and 3rd centuries. These, too, had three main divisions: a central door leading to the altar, smaller flanking passages, and a distribution of parts similar to a templon. The Torah screen was probably not the direct prototype of the templon; it probably derives from the imitation of the Torah screen in the altar of a typical Syrian pagan temple.

A direct comparison can also be made to the layout of the great Temple of Jerusalem. The most sacred and innermost portion, known as the Holy of Holies, was where the Ark of the Covenant was kept. This room was separated from the larger part of the main building's interior by a large curtain, the "veil of the temple". Only the High Priest was allowed to enter the Holy of Holies, and only once a year on Yom Kippur. The third part was the entrance court. This architectural tradition for the two main parts can be seen carried forward in Christian churches and is still most demonstratively present in Eastern Orthodox churches where the iconostatsis divides the altar, the Holy of Holies containing the consecrated Eucharist – the manifestation of the New Covenant, from the larger portion of the church accessible to the faithful. In Orthodox Christian tradition, with the exception of churches at women's monasteries, only men with good cause may enter the altar portion behind the iconostasis.

Barriers called templons in Greek were also used on occasions when the Roman Emperors appeared in public, to segregate the Imperial retinue from the crowd.

== Etymology ==
Templon is a loan word in Greek, from the Latin templum, "temple"; how and why it came to have its present meaning is unclear. The most obvious explanation is that the form of the templon resembles a pagan temple. The steps up to the apse (semicircle where the altar is located) are analogous to the stereobate and stylobate of the temple (the floor of a temple). The colonnettes arranged in the π shape resemble the columns that surround all four sides of a temple, the architrave looks like the architrave on a temple, and the carved disks on the architrave are analogous to the metopes on the entablature.

However, it has also been suggested that the name templon derives not from the pagan temples but from the Christian idea of the shrine where God was worshipped, or more specifically the Temple in Jerusalem. In almost all modern European languages, the word templon is a direct and late borrowing of the Greek architectural term, and it is rarely found outside the academic usage; besides the Greek templon, another direct descendant of the Latin templum, having the same architectural meaning, is the Romanian word tâmplă, "iconostasis".

== Early templa ==
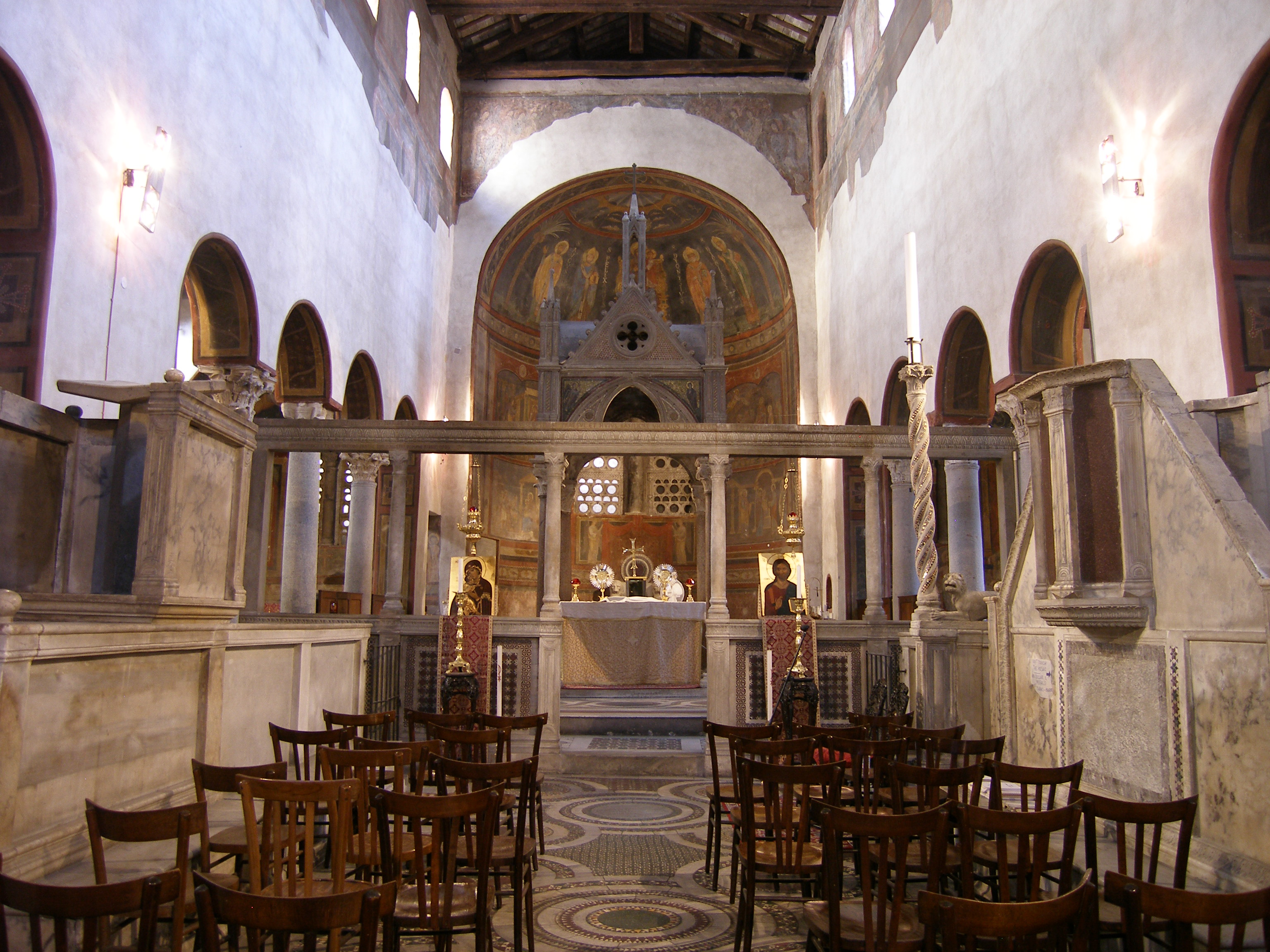
Santa Maria in Cosmedin, Rome

The chancel barriers are also known in archaeology as chancel screens. Archaeological evidence for an early templon comes from the Cathedral of St. John at Stoudios in Constantinople, a basilica dedicated to John the Baptist, built around 463. The chancel barrier surrounded the altar in a π shape, with one large door facing the nave and two smaller doors on the other sides. Twelve piers held chancel slabs of about 1.6 meters in length. The height of the slabs is not known. The chancel barrier was not merely a low parapet (a short wall); remains of colonnettes have been found, suggesting that the barrier carried an architrave on top of the columns.

The enclosure around the altar was in early times called an Ambitus Altaris, and their railings were called cancelli, sometimes with columns or arches bearing curtains. According to St. Gregory of Tours, these curtains were also painted and embroidered with sacred images in France, and noted the presence of chancel screens in the apse of the Church of St. Pancras near Rome, and the Hagia Sophia in Constantinople. Pope Leo III also erected a pure silver chancel screen during the reign of Charlemagne. The 9th century Basilica of St. Mary Major had a screen of six purple marble columns topped with an architrave of white marble, from which hung veils. A lower barrier of silver columns projected outward from the screen.

Many fragments of a marble templon have been discovered on the Temple Mount in Jerusalem.

Though there is some architectural and archaeological evidence of early templa, the first and most detailed description of a templon comes from a poem by Paul the Silentiary, describing Hagia Sophia in Constantinople. It was composed near the end of Justinian I's reign and was probably recited on Epiphany, January 6, 563, celebrating the reinauguration of the church after the reconstruction of the great dome.

Hagia Sophia's templon surrounded, according to Paulus, "such space as was reserved in the eastern arch of the great church for the bloodless sacrifices". That is, it stretched the length of the eastern semidome, including the apse but excluding the exedrae (half-dome recesses in a wall). Twelve silver-covered marble columns of approximately 4.94 meters from base to capital were arranged on three sides of a rectangular ground plan around the altar. A horizontal entablature rested upon these. Three doors allowed entry to the apse, the central one larger than the other two. Though earlier scholars have proposed that all columns and all doors were in a single line parallel to the apse, modern reconstructions show the central portal facing out to the nave with the smaller doors each located on the other sides of the rectangular plan.

In between the columns were slabs of marble covered in silver about 1.00 to 1.10 meters tall. On them had been carved the monograms of Justinian and Theodora (6th century), even though Theodora had been dead for several years, as well as a many-armed cross in the center. On the center of the architrave was a repoussé medallion of Christ. On either side of Him were medallions of angels, the Prophets, the Apostles, and finally the Virgin Mary. The carvings on the architrave were deeply tied to the liturgy. Another templon roughly contemporary to Hagia Sophia's is that of the church to St. John of Ephesus, rebuilt by Justinian as a domed crucifix. There was an inscription to St. John the Theologian over a side door, since the crypt of the saint was within the enclosed sanctuary. St. John the Baptist was probably carved over the other door of the templon of Hagia Sophia, since he features prominently in liturgical writings of the church.

In any case, the majority of templa followed the same basic design. They were usually carved of monochrome marble, though some, like Hagia Sophia's, were covered in precious metals and others used polychrome marbles. The slabs were often carved with vegetal or animal patterns and the architraves with busts of God, the Virgin, and the saints. Figurative decoration on the templon was mainly concentrated on the architrave, initially with carved busts. This continued from the time of Justinian into the middle Byzantine period, as shown from a 10th-century excavation in Sebaste in Phrygia, which uncovered a marble templon whose epistyle is covered with busts of saints. There is evidence that icons were hung from the columns of the templon prior to iconoclasm. Nicephorus I, Patriarch of Constantinople from 806 to 815 describes portable icons hung from columns and the gate of the templon in his Antirretikoi. Important portable and colossal icons were also placed in front of the templon, as in the 11th-century church of Saint Panteleimon in Nerzei.

== Evolution ==
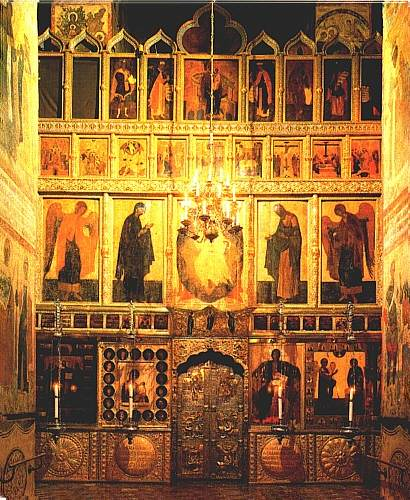
Five-panel Deesis row, Iconostasis of the Cathedral of the Annunciation in the Moscow Kremlin by Theophanes the Greek, 1405 – the first five-row Iconostasis

The templon gradually replaced all other forms of chancel barriers in Byzantine churches in the 6th, 7th, and 8th centuries except in Cappadocia. As late as the 10th century, a simple wooden chancel barrier separated the apse from the nave in the rock-cut churches, though by the late 11th century, the templon had become standard. This may have been because of the veneration and imitation of the Great Church Hagia Sophia in Constantinople, though the columnar form of chancel barrier does predate Hagia Sophia.

The templon began to change forms to the medieval templon with the attachment of icons and painted scenes to the architrave. Some of the best preserved of these images are from the Saint Catherine's Monastery on Mount Sinai in Egypt. The late 12th-century templon beam shows twelve canonical feast scenes, with the Deesis (Christ enthroned, flanked by Mary and St. John the Baptist) located in the middle between the Transfiguration and the Raising of Lazarus, linking the scene of Lazarus with the Holy Week images according to liturgical practice. Several epistyles of this form have been excavated throughout the empire, none earlier than the 12th century, indicating a change from busts on the architrave to scenic decoration. This new scenic style is representative of the increasing liturgification in Byzantine representational art after iconoclasm.

During most of the Middle Byzantine period, the space between the colonnettes was not filled with icons but with curtains. Nicholaos Andidorum describes in his Protheoria "the shutting of the doors and the closing of the curtain over them". The most widespread image on the medieval templon seems to have been the Deesis. Its popularity arose from not only its simplicity and elegance, suggesting the efficacy of prayer and the threat of the Last Judgment, but also because it could be easily adapted to the patron's tastes with the addition of secondary scenes and characters, as in the Saint Catherine's Monastery where scenes from the life of St Eustratios appear on either side of the Deesis on a templon beam. Proskynetaria (large icons) also played a major part in the decoration of the medieval templon, either as monumental images placed on the piers flanking the templon or as portable images in front of the screen. Proskynetaria of both these types still exist in Cyprus, from Lagoudera, now in the Archbishop's Palace in Nicosia, and in St Neophytos.

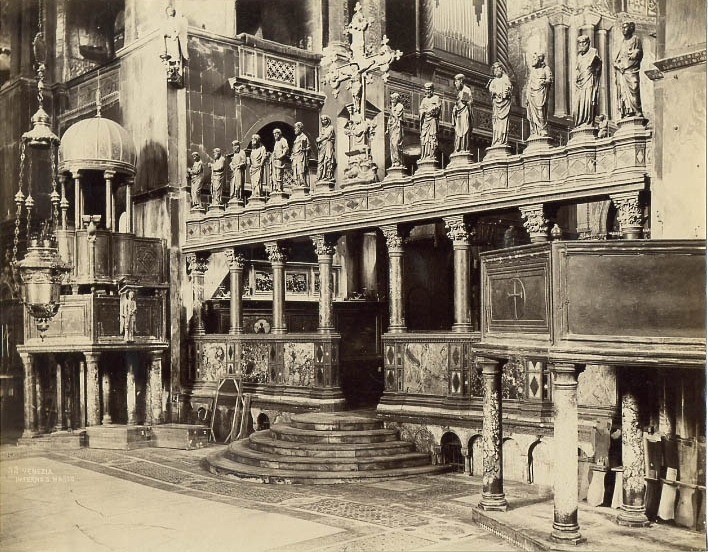
A columnar templon at St Mark's Basilica, Venice

Sometime between the 11th and 14th centuries, icons and proskynetaria began to be placed in the intercolumnar openings on the templon. After the reconquest in 1261, carving on the medieval templon approached sculpture in the round. From this period, the first wood-carved templa, or iconostases, were produced. They for most part had a fixed program of icon decoration with three levels: the Local, the Deesis, and the Festival tiers. Early Russian versions were at chest height, and called "thoraxis" in Greek.

The full height iconostasis became standard in the 15th century, and probably owes more to 14th-century Hesychast mysticism and the wood-carving genius of the Russians than anything else. The first ceiling-high, five-leveled Russian iconostasis was designed for the Cathedral of the Annunciation in Moscow Kremlin by Theophanes the Greek in 1405, and soon copied by his assistant Andrey Rublyov in the Cathedral of the Dormition in Vladimir in 1408.

== Churches with existing templon ==
This is a list of known churches which retain their templon. Some have had icons placed inside, and others are modern reconstructions of the original Templon.

- Torcello Cathedral, Torcello, Italy (7th century)
- St. Christine of Lena, Lena, Spain (9th century)
- Holy Apostles Church, Athens, Greece (10th century)
  - Templon is a modern reconstruction.
- St. Leontius Monastery - Katholikon, Vodoča, North Macedonia (10th century)
- St. Panteleimon Church, Ohrid, North Macedonia (10th century)
  - Templon is a modern reconstruction, filled with icons.
- Hosios Loukas Monastery - Katholikon, Distomo, Greece (11th century)
  - Templon has been filled with icons.
- St. John the Forerunner Monastery - Katholikon, Athens, Greece (11th century)
- St. Sophia Church, Ohrid, North Macedonia (11th century)
  - Templon is a modern reconstruction, filled with icons.
- Transfiguration of our Savior Church, Christianoupoli, Messenia, Greece (11th century)
  - Templon is a unique design, an extension of the church walls.
- Nea Moni - Katholikon, Chios, Greece (11th century)
  - Templon is a modern reconstruction.
- Theotokos Peribleptos Church, Ohrid, North Macedonia (11th century)
  - Templon has been filled with icons.
- Panagia Chalkeon, Thessaloniki, Greece (11th century)
  - Templon has been filled with icons.
- St. Mary in Cosmedin, Rome, Italy (11th century)
- St. George Church, Staro Nagoričane, North Macedonia (11th century)
  - Templon has been filled with icons.
- Kaisariani Monastery - Katholikon, Athens, Greece (12th century)
- St. Nicholas Church, Serres, Greece (12th century)
  - Templon has been filled with icons.
- Transfiguration Church, Amfissa, Greece (12th century)
- St. Panteleimon Church, Gorno Nerezi, North Macedonia
- St. Eleftherios Church, Athens, Greece (13th century)
  - Templon is a modern reconstruction.
- Porta Panagia Church, Pyli, Greece (13th century)
  - Templon has been filled with icons.
- St. Nicholas Orphanos Church, Thessaloniki, Greece (14th century)
- Decani Monastery - Katholikon, Dečani, Kosovo (14th century)
- St. Catherine Church, Thessaloniki, Greece (14th century)
  - Templon has been filled with icons.
- Holy Apostles Church, Thessaloniki, Greece (14th century)
  - Templon has been filled with icons.
- Prophet Elijah Church, Thessaloniki, Greece (14th century)
  - Templon has been filled with icons.
- St Mark's Basilica, Venice, Italy (14th century)

== Gallery ==
Photos of existing templon within churches. Some have had icons placed between the columns.

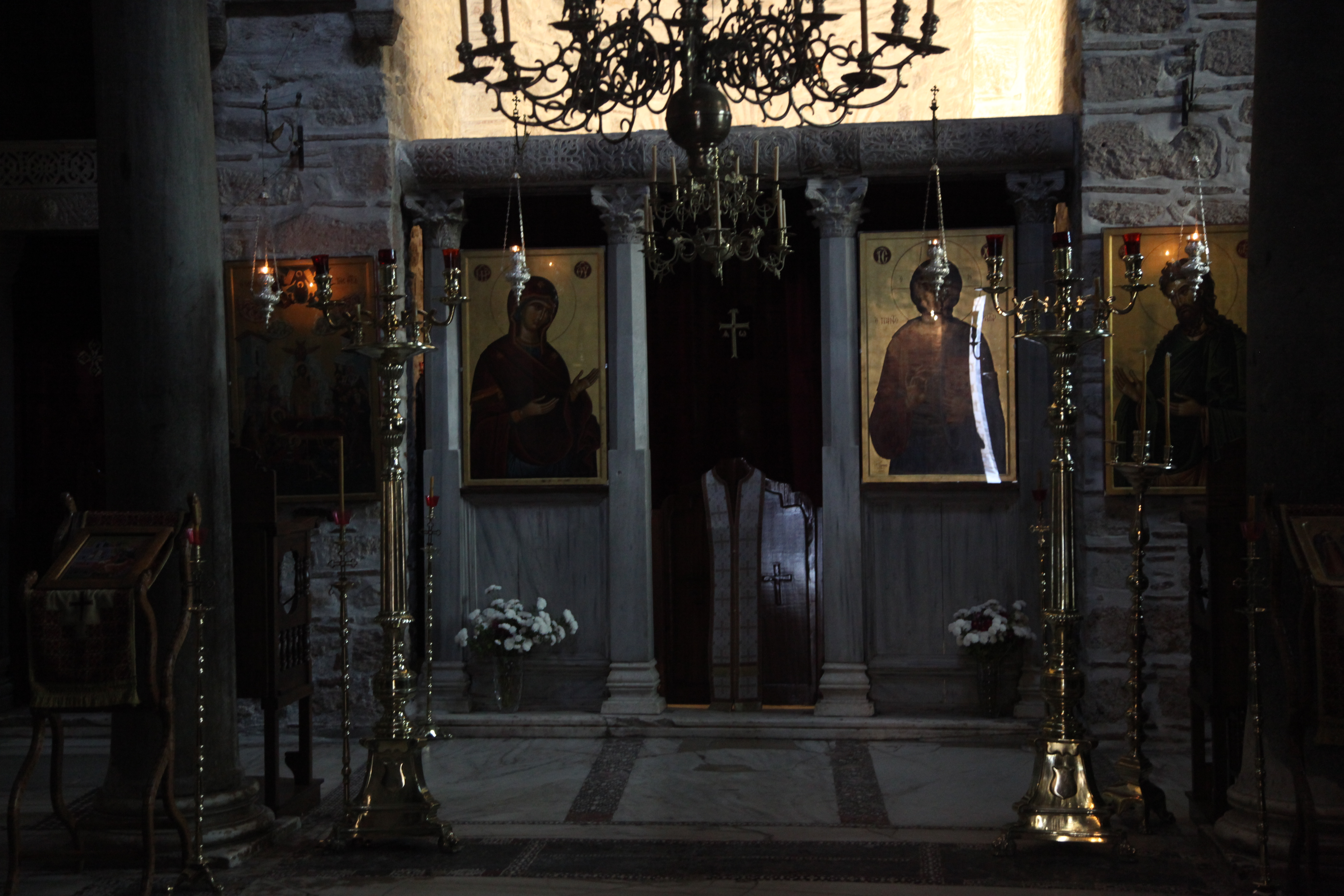
Hosios Loukas - Church of the Theotokos

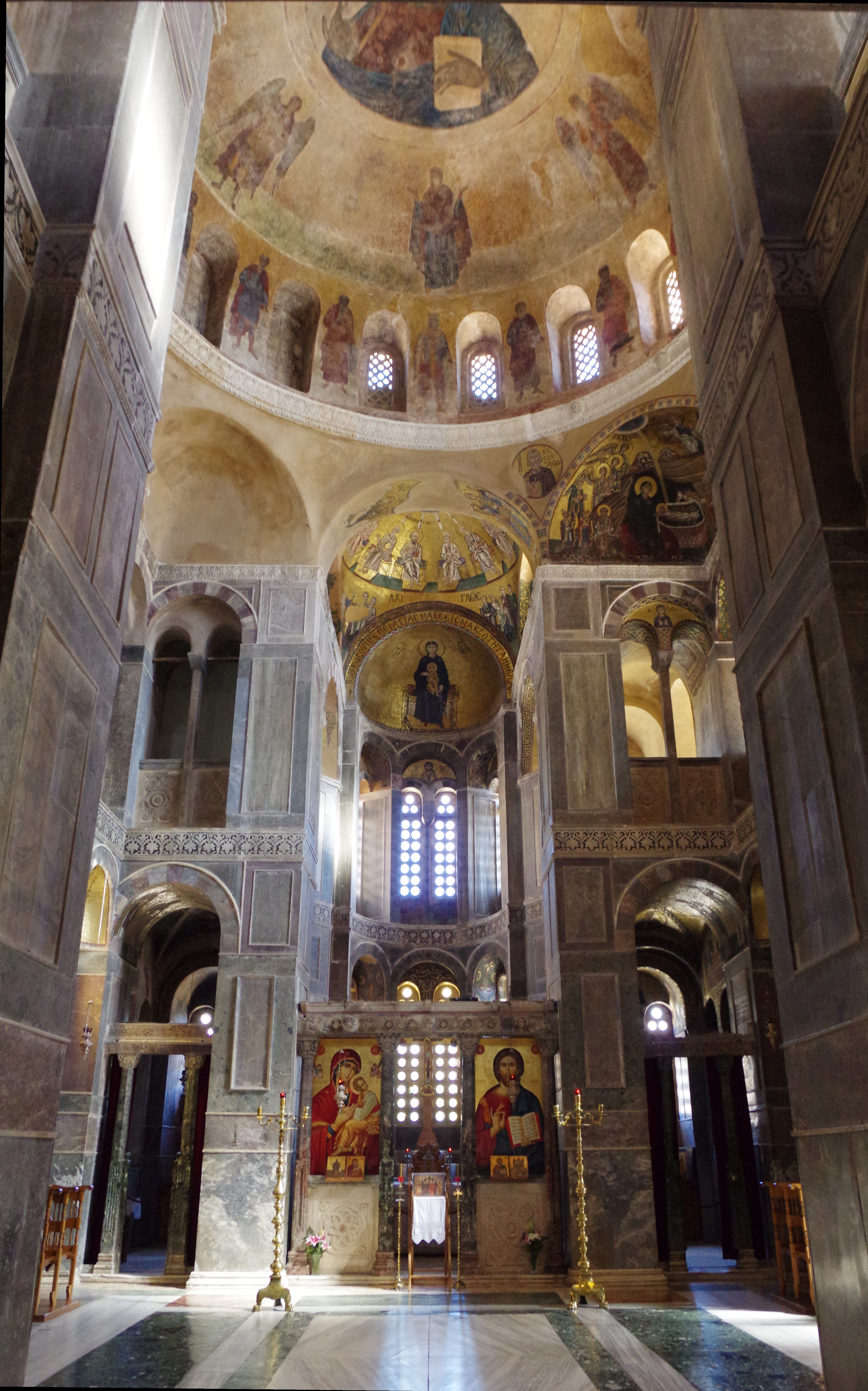
Hosios Loukas - Katholikon

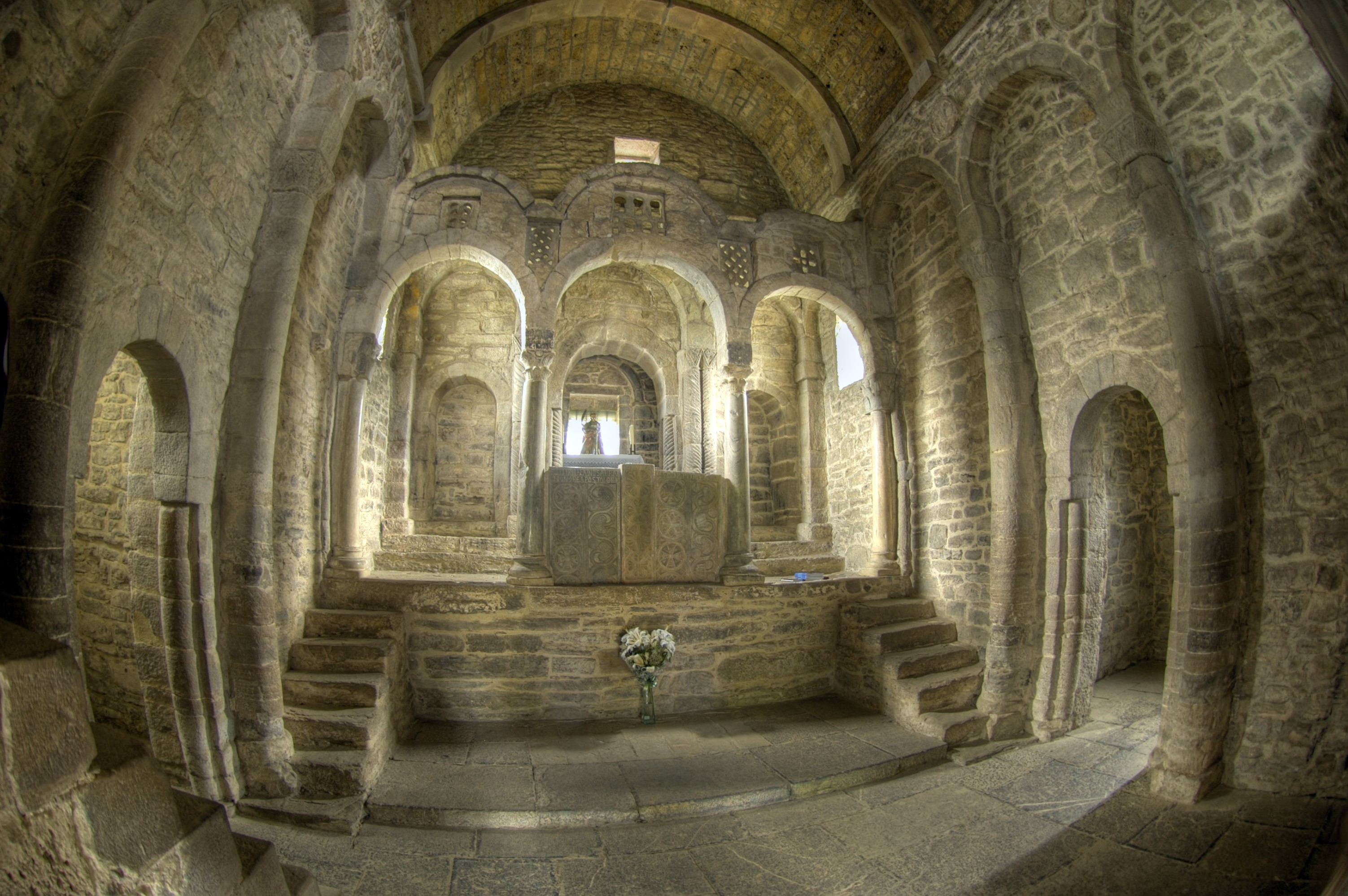
Church of St. Christine of Lena

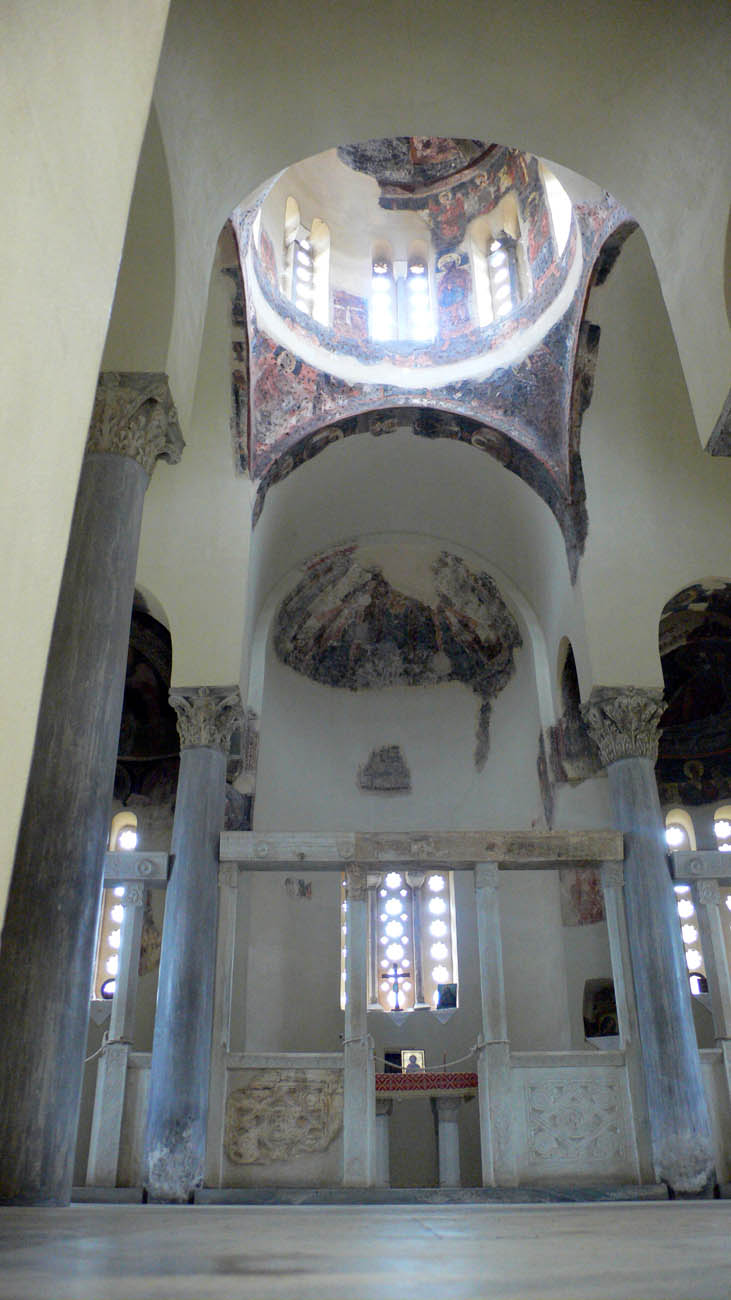
Church of the Holy Apostles in Athens

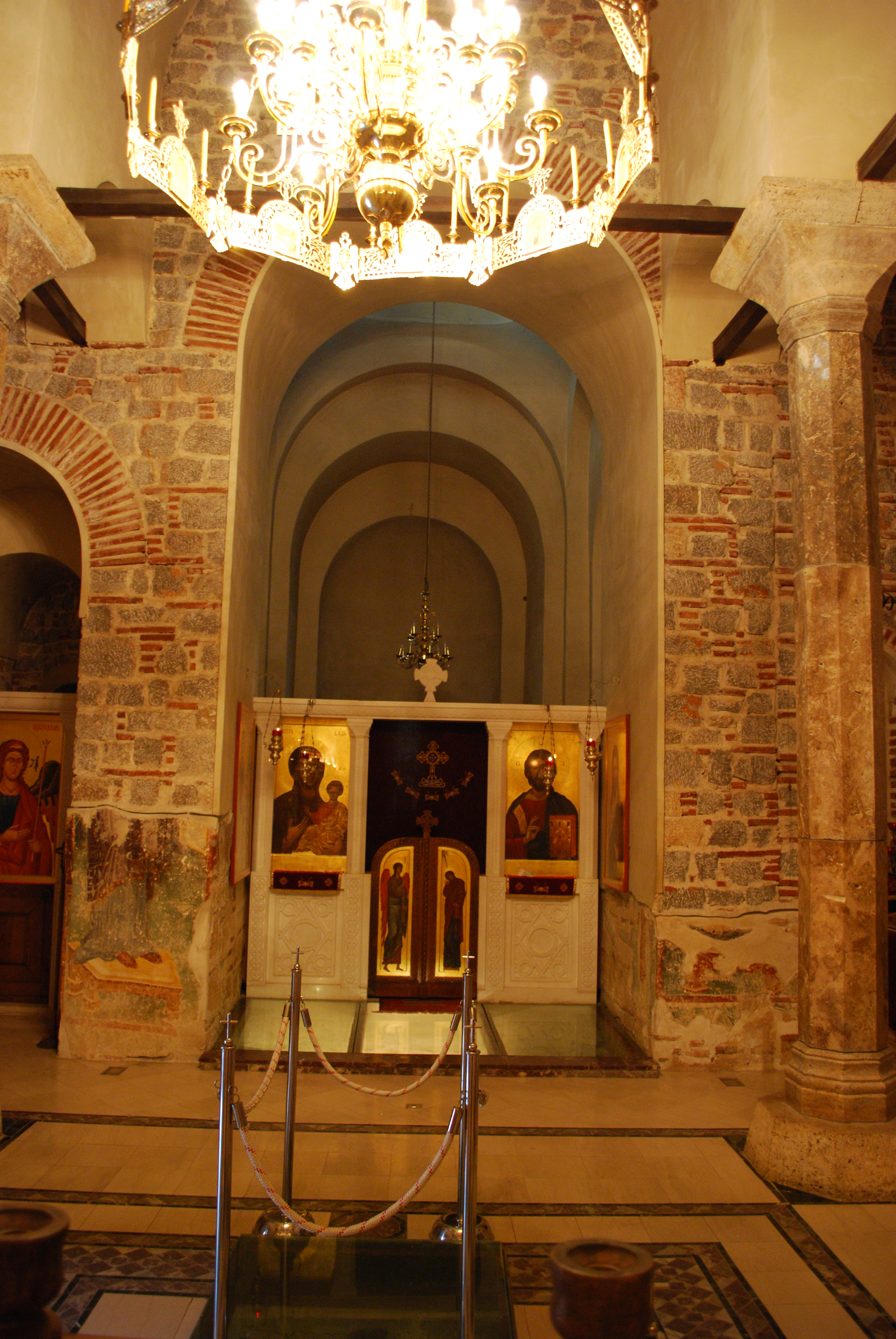
Church of St. Panteleimon in Ohrid

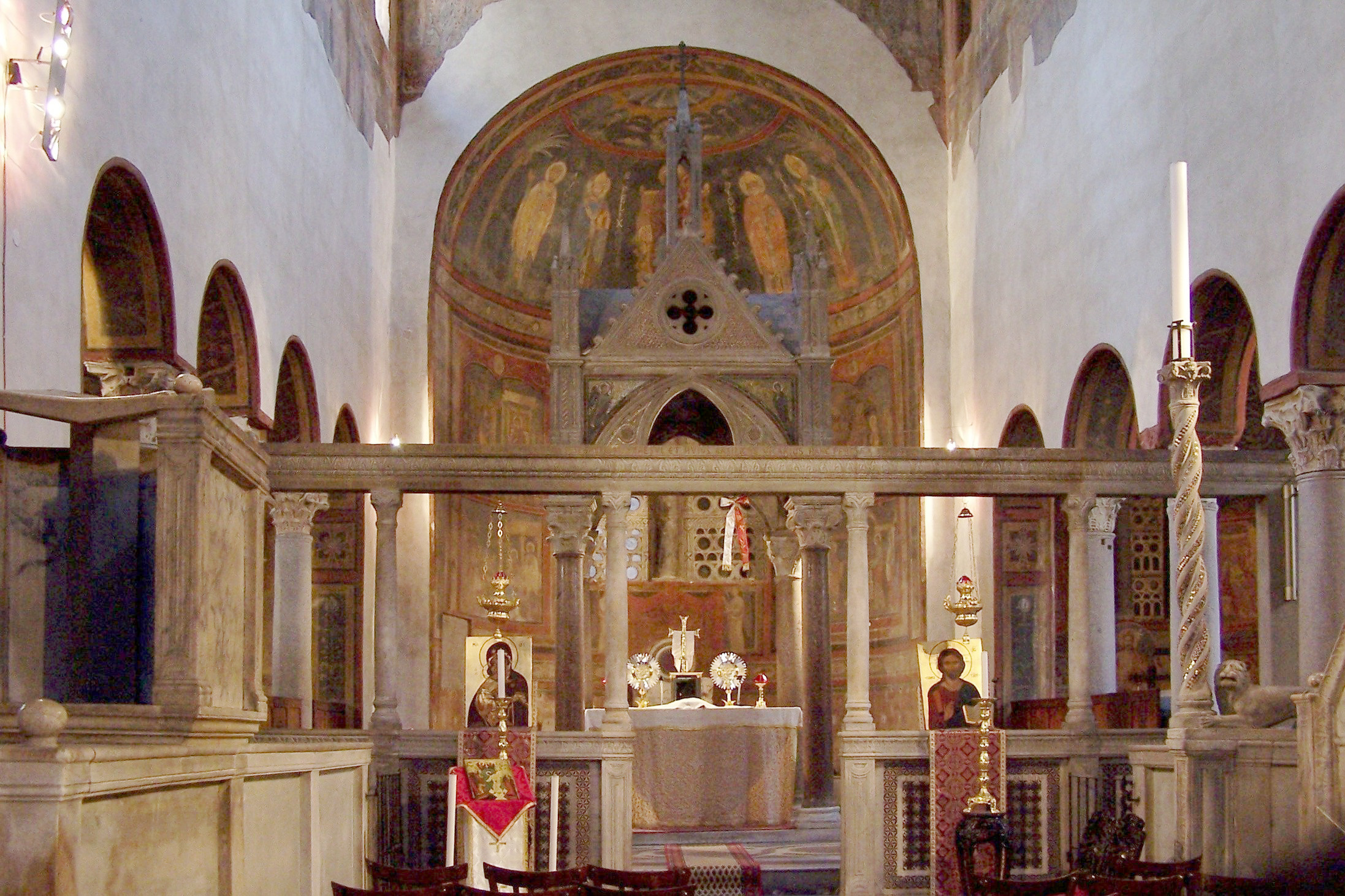
Church of St. Mary in Cosmedin

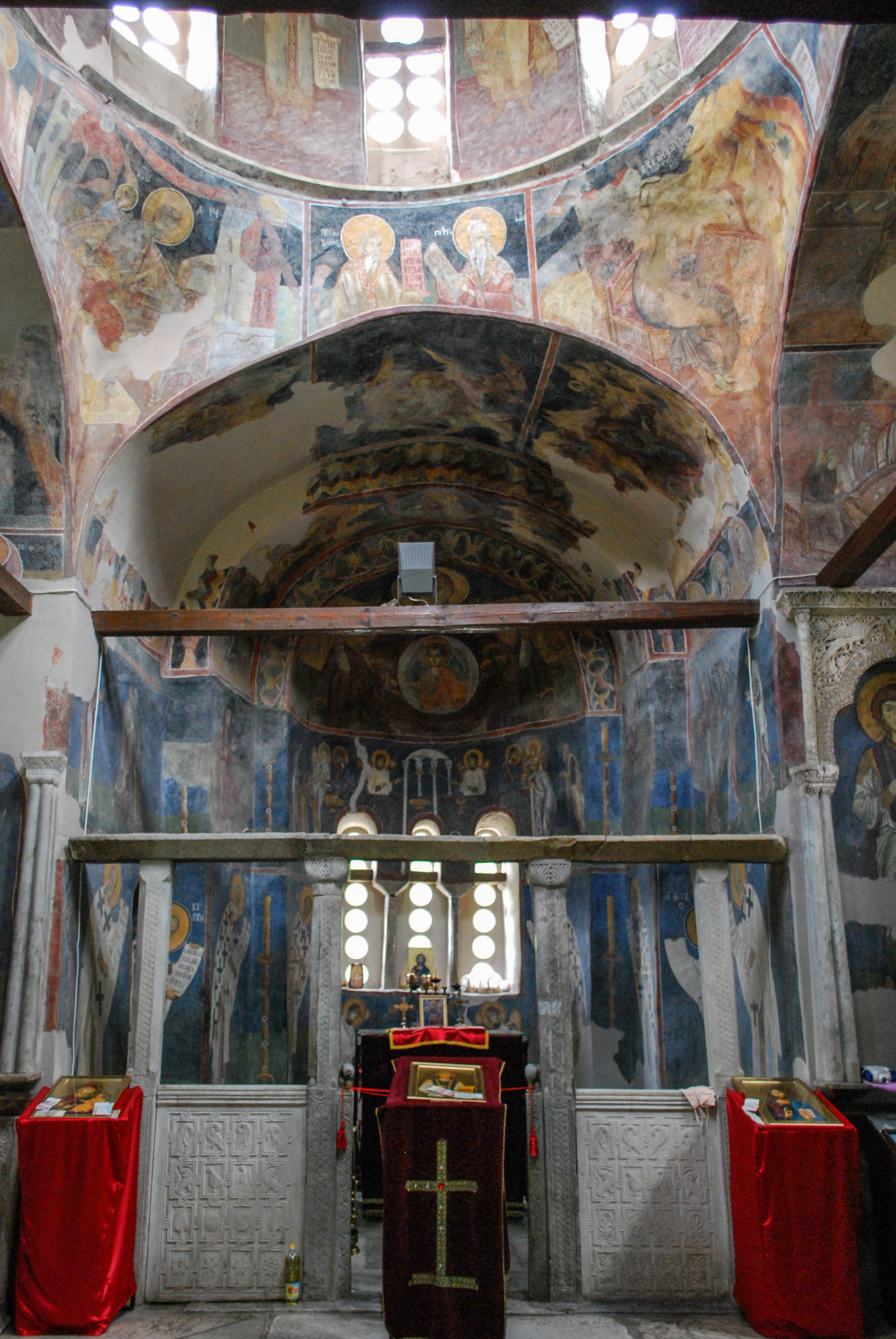
Church of St. Panteleimon in Gorno Nerezi

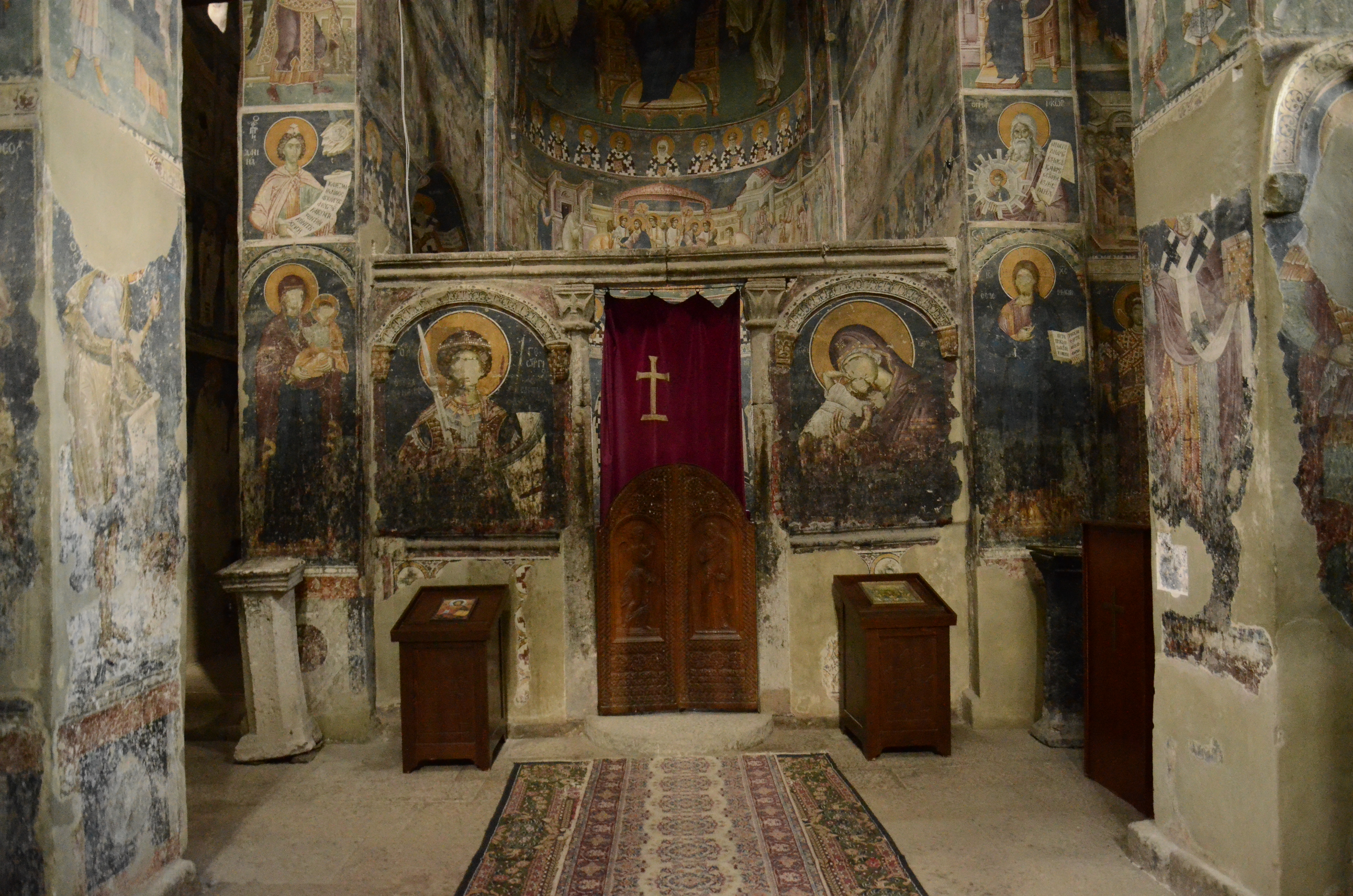
Church of St. George, Staro Nagoričane

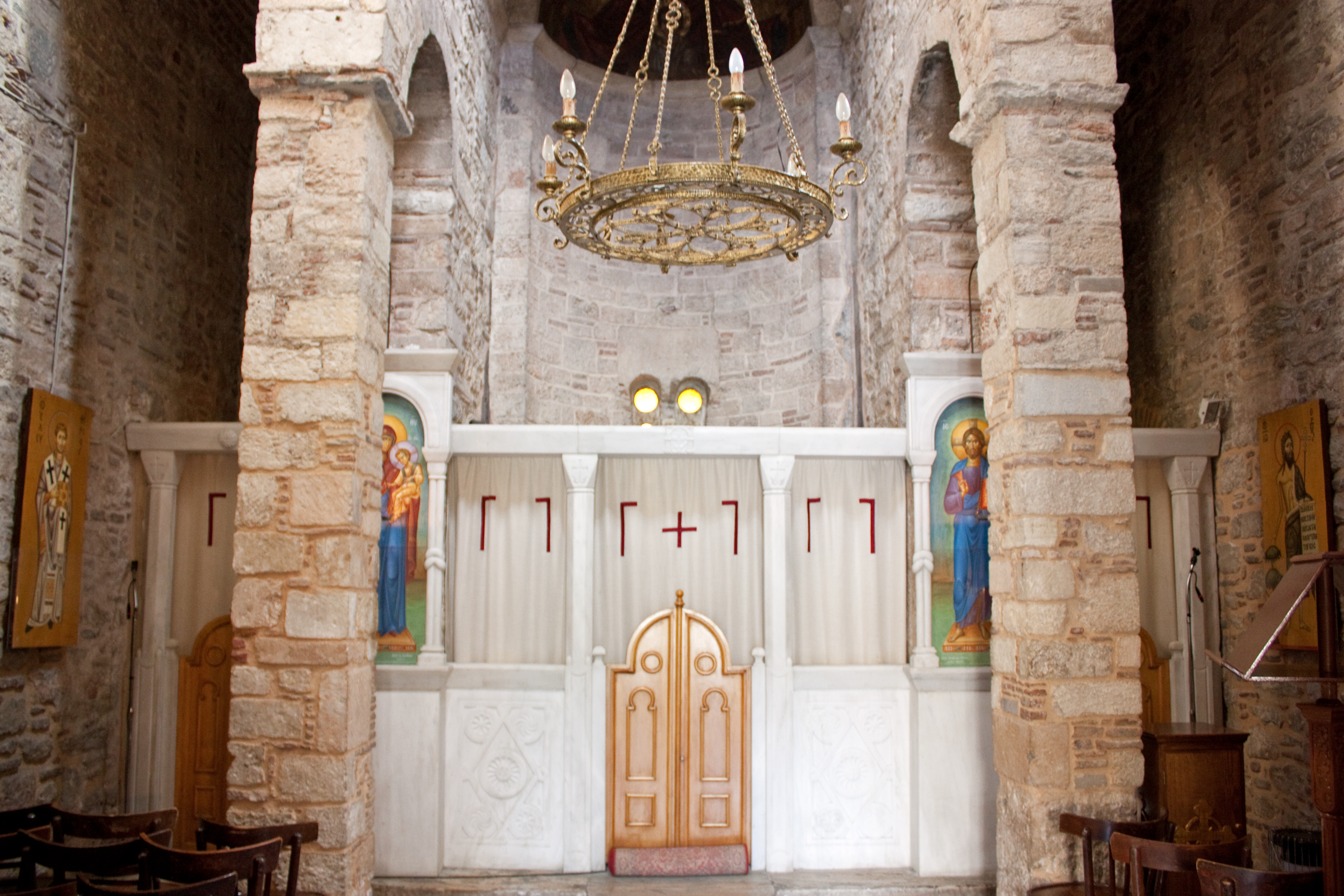
Church of St. Eleftherios in Athens

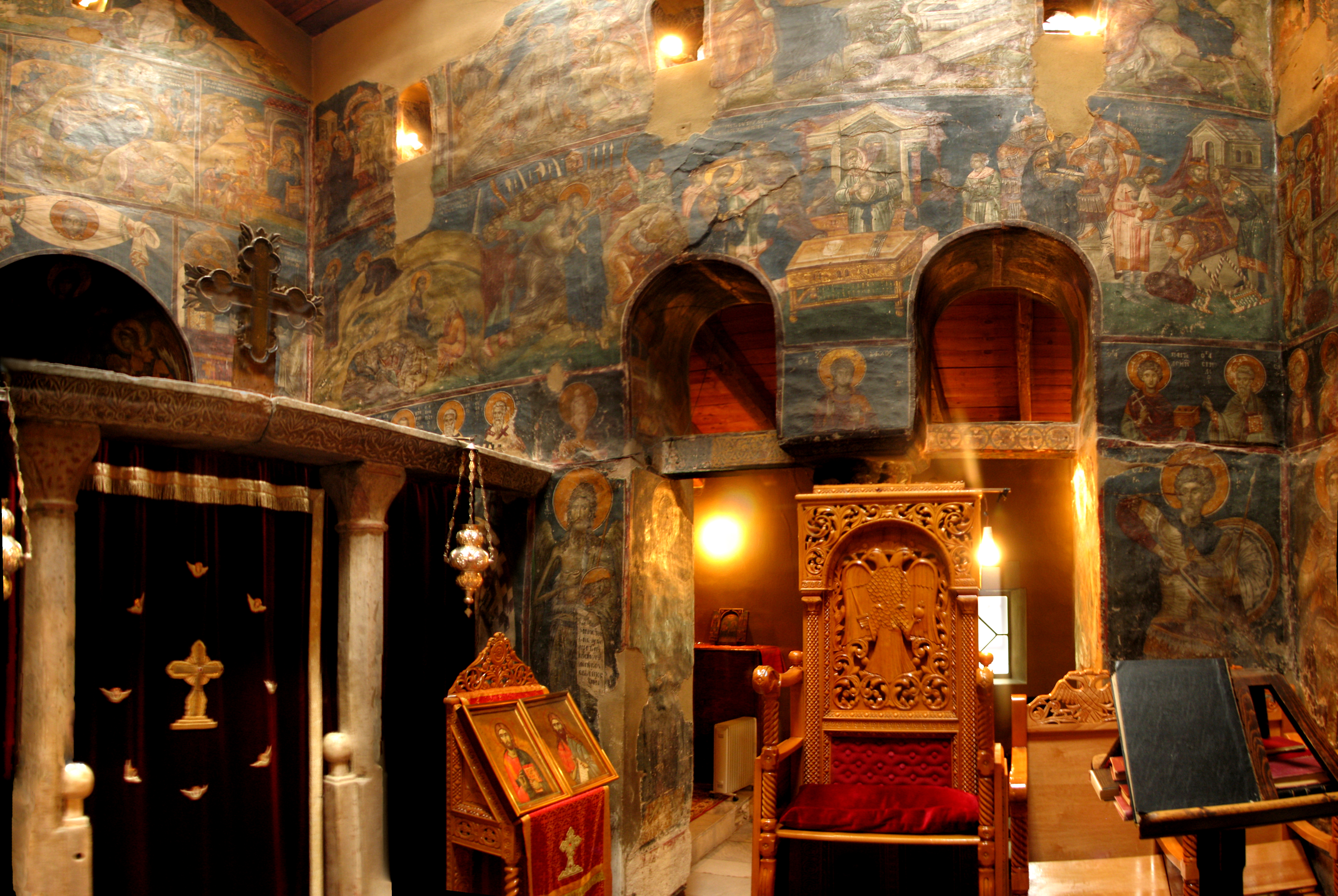
Church of St. Nicholas Orphanos in Thessaloniki

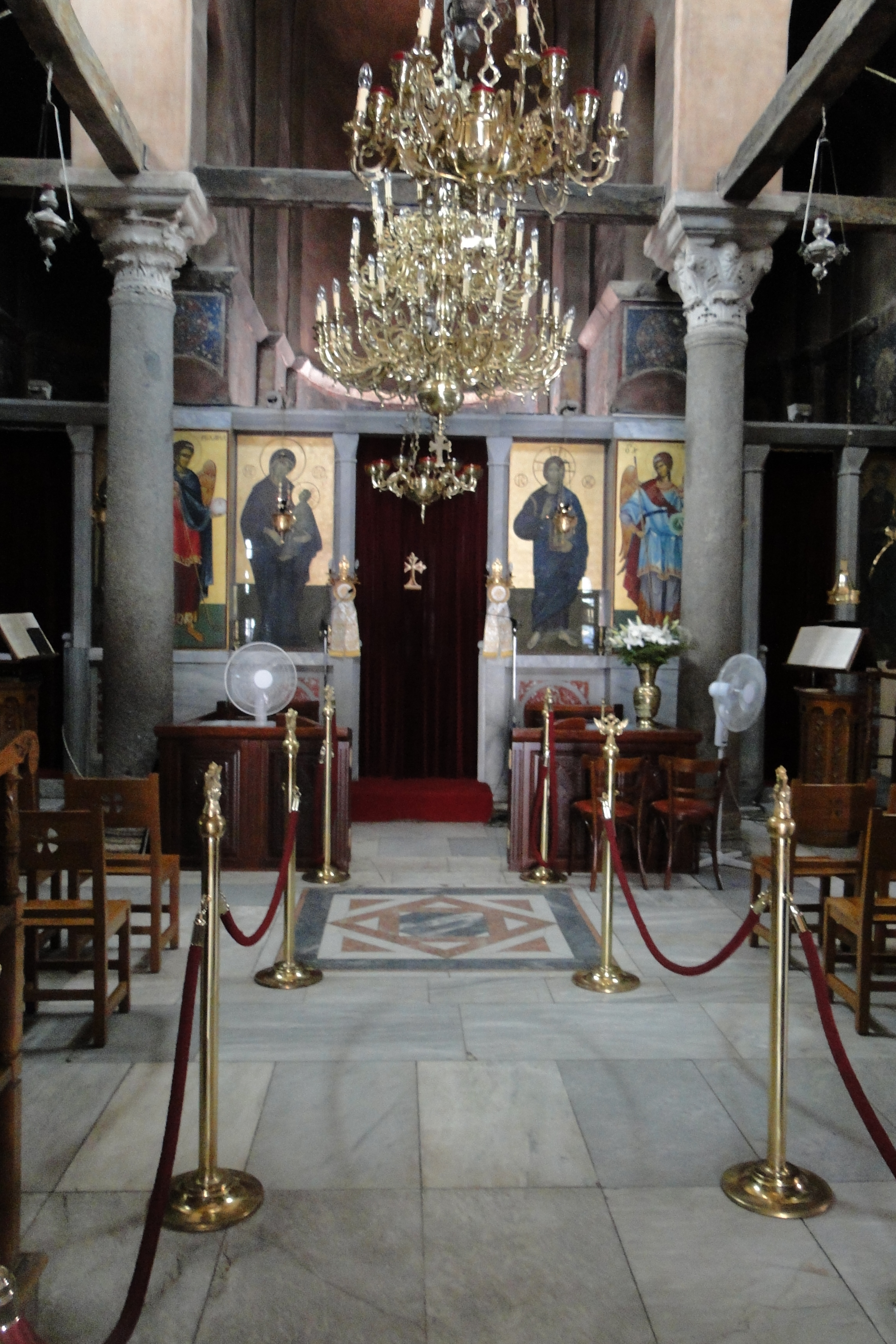
Church of the Holy Apostles in Thessaloniki

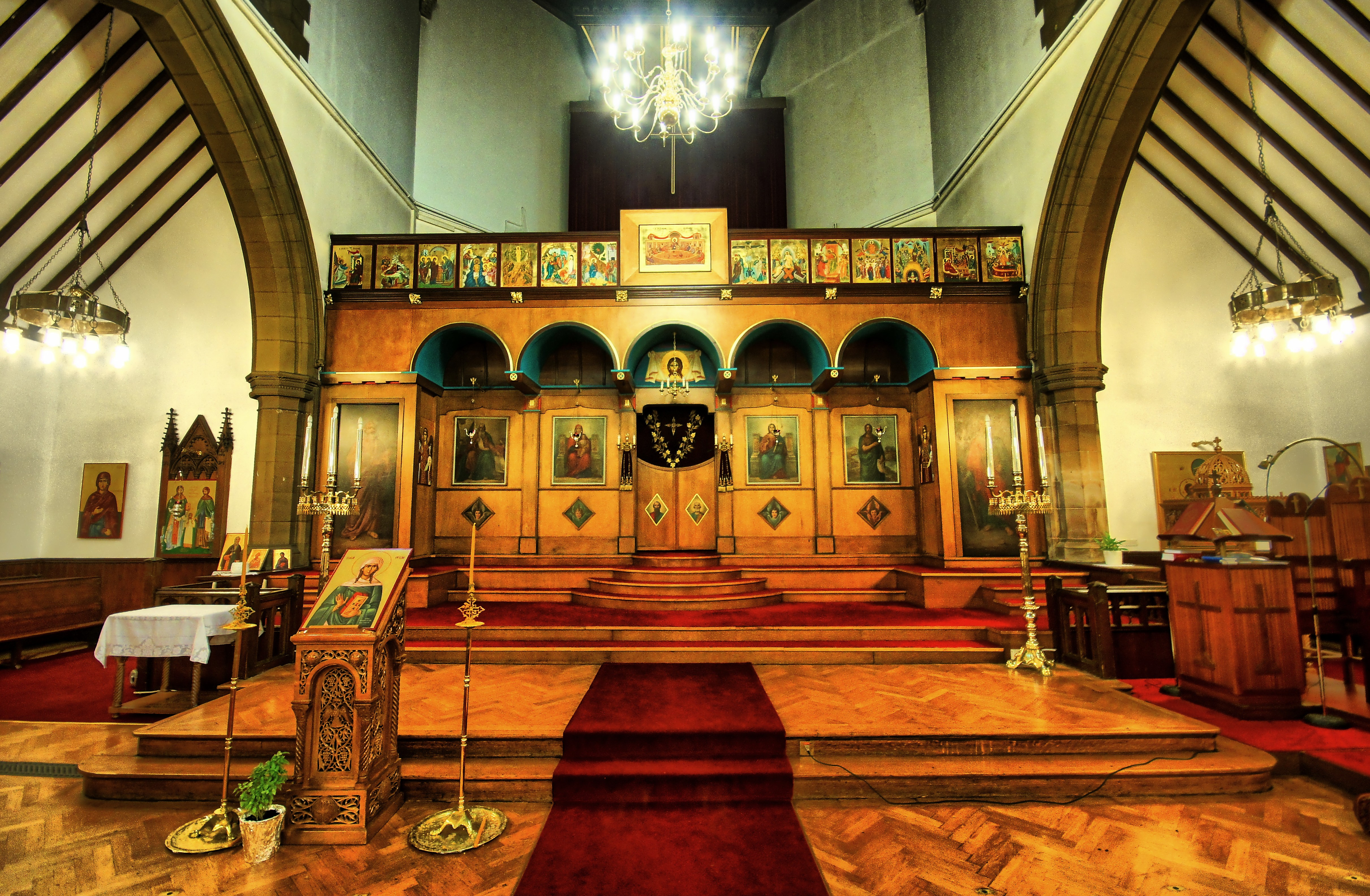
Greek Orthodox Cathedral of St Luke, Glasgow

== See also ==
- Ambon (liturgy)
- Bema
- Rood screen
- Tribune (architecture)
