= Church of St Nicholas, Sapareva Banya =

Medieval church building in Bulgaria

Coordinates: 42°17′20.37″N 23°15′46.97″E

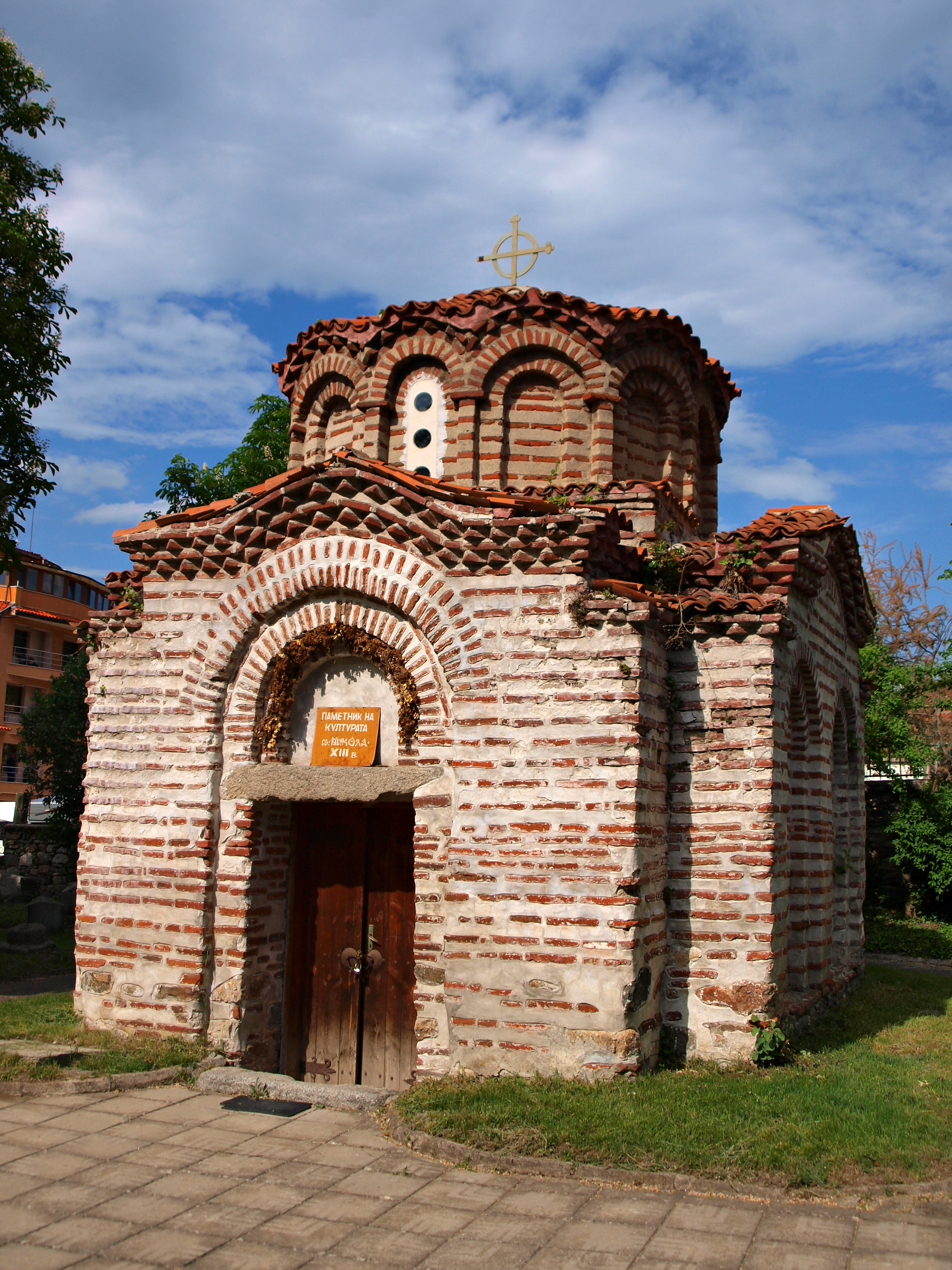
The Church of St Nicholas in Sapareva Banya

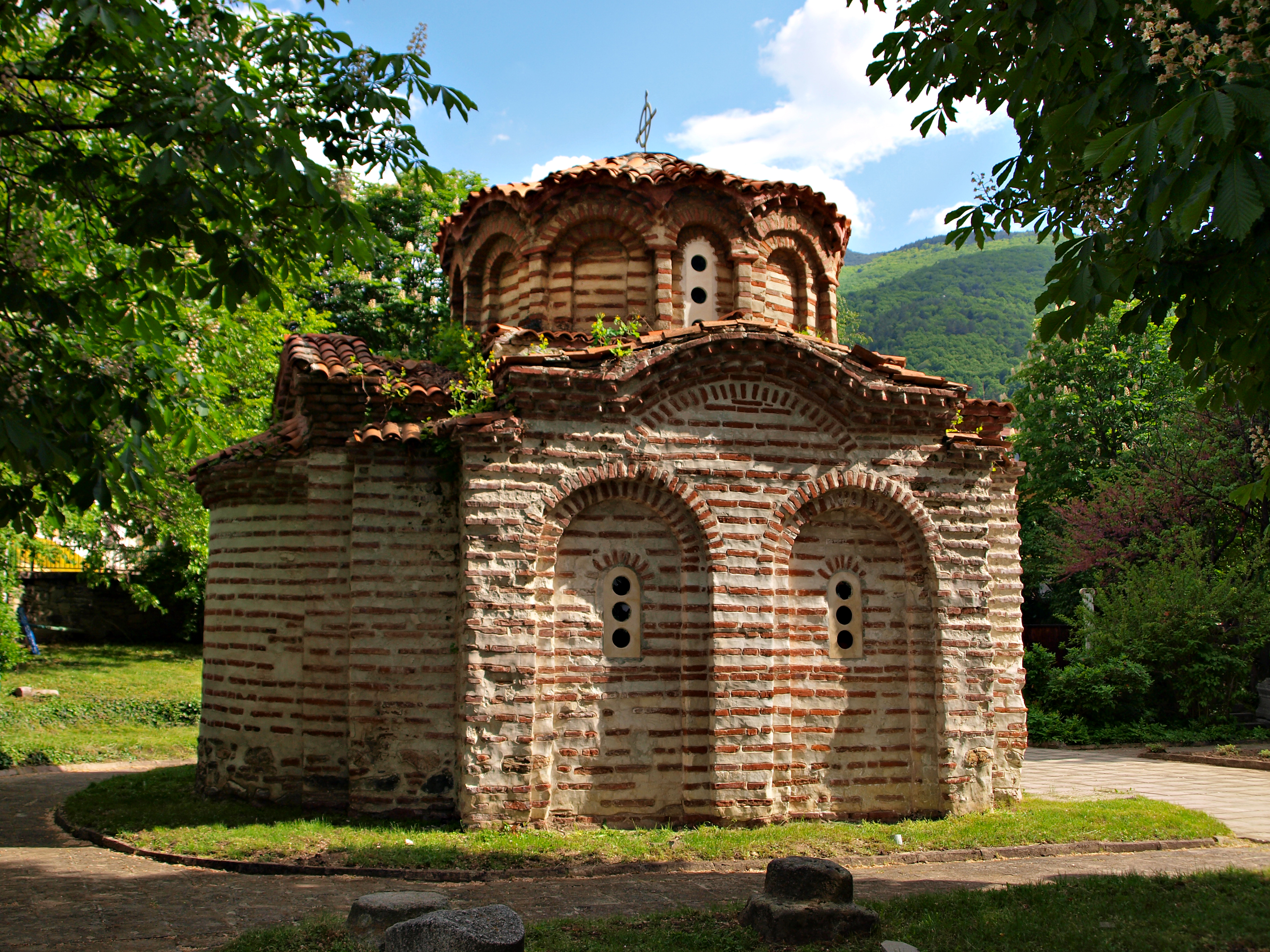
Side view from the north with the apse visible

The Church of St Nicholas (Bulgarian: църква „Свети Никола“, tsarkva „Sveti Nikola“) is a small medieval Eastern Orthodox church in the southwestern Bulgarian town of Sapareva Banya, which is part of Kyustendil Province. Originally either the property of a local notable or attached to a larger church, it was constructed anytime from the 11th to the 14th century.

The church was built using red bricks and white mortar. Architecturally, it is of a simple Byzantine cross-in-square design, with a single nave and apse. The frescoes in the interior are only scarcely preserved. It was reconstructed in 1937 after falling into ruin, and it was listed as a monument of culture of national importance in 1968.

== History ==
Scholars disagree on the possible period of the church's construction; assessments range from the 11th–12th, through the 12th–13th, to the 13th–14th century. In an article in the Bulgarian Church Review magazine from 1898, the local priest Mihal Popov was cited as saying that a stone from the church altar was unearthed during excavations. The priest believed that the stone, which reportedly had the date 1160 inscribed on it, was sent to the National Archaeological Museum in the capital Sofia.

Due to its diminutive size, the Church of St Nicholas was probably not constructed as an independent church. A legend links the church to the name of an unidentified local feudal lord named Nikola (Nicholas) as his final resting place, though archaeologist Nikola Mavrodinov considers it more likely that it was possibly a chapel or a cemetery church attached to a larger place of worship. The larger church was perhaps pulled down during the early Ottoman rule of Bulgaria (post-14th century). While the Church of St Nicholas was not destroyed, its renovation was prohibited by the Ottomans, thus it gradually fell into ruin.

In his 1931 study, Mavrodinov also writes that at the time, the church lacked a roof. He references a story about a group of Circassians that were settled in Sapareva Banya on the order of the Ottoman authorities after the Crimean War (1853–1856). According to that story, the Circassians sought to pull down the church's roof. However, one of them fell to his death inside the church, so they fled in horror. The church was thoroughly reconstructed in 1937 by a team under architect Rashenov.

== Architecture ==
The Church of St Nicholas lies in the centre of Sapareva Banya. Its architecture is rather simple, with a single nave, a single apse and no narthex present. The church follows the Byzantine cross-in-square design, with unusually short arms of equal size. The dome has twelve sides and is of no particular height, though it is rather large for the church's size. The apse is situated on the church's eastern side; its shape is semicircular and it features a window. The entrance is located on the west wall.

The church was constructed out of rows of red bricks stuck together with white mortar. According to scholar Bistra Nikolova, its size is 7.20 by 5.50 metres (23.6 ft × 18.0 ft), while another source measures it as 6.60 m × 5.40 m (21.7 ft × 17.7 ft). Either way, it is square in appearance. In height, it probably reached 6.60 m (21.7 ft) at the dome and 4.20 m (13.8 ft) at the cornice.

In terms of design and decoration, Mavrodinov likens the church to the Church of St Pantaleon in Gorno Nerezi near Skopje, today in North Macedonia. It is also compared to the Church of St Theodore in nearby Boboshevo. The Church of St Nicholas features a multitude of two-stepped vaults on its outside walls. The interior was originally entirely covered with frescoes, though only fragments survive. It was enlisted as a monument of culture of national importance in 1968, with a publication in Bulgaria's newspaper of record, the State Gazette, issue 77.
