= Proskynetarion =

Term suggesting worship and reverence, and name of several works

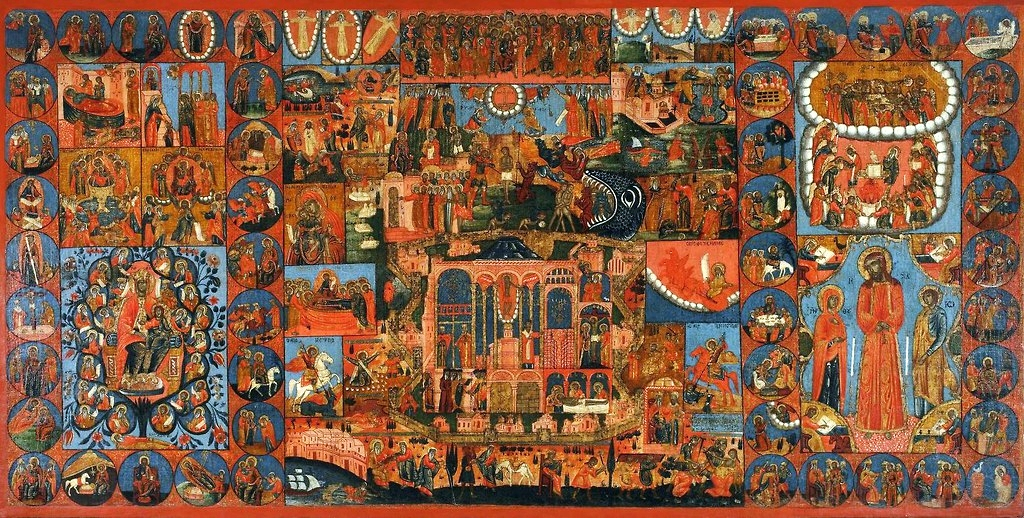
So-called Warsaw Proskynetarion (pilgrim souvenir icon, c. 1795), National Museum in Warsaw

A proskynetarion (Greek προσκυνητάριον, plural proskynetaria; from προσκύνησις, proskynesis, lit. 'kiss towards something') is a term suggesting worship and reverence, which has several concrete applications.

== Islamic cultic place or object ==
As a rare Byzantine term meaning "oratory" or "place of worship", it was used for Islamic cultic places or objects.

== Monumental icon ==
"Proskynetarion" can mean a monumental icon of the Eastern Orthodox Church usually depicting Christ, the Virgin Mary, or the patron saint of a church. Proskynetaria were usually made of mosaic or fresco in a marble frame and placed on the piers separating the parts of a templon in a Byzantine church, though proskynetaria of patron saints were often in the narthex or on the nave walls.

== Pilgrim's guide to the Holy Land ==
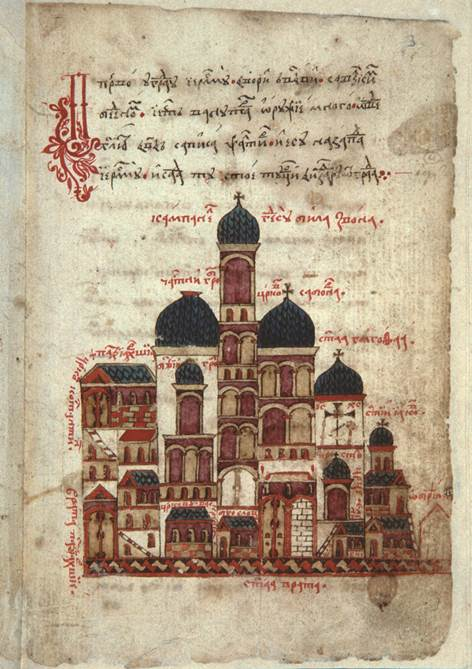
Page from a 1662 Serbian proskynetarion (pilgrim's guide) showing the Church of the Holy Sepulchre

Proskynetaria were also a genre of Orthodox Christian pilgrim guides to the Holy Land, which appeared in the mid-17th century and flourished during the 18th. The usually small-format, accessibly written books served as practical itinerary suggestions, with descriptions of the pilgrimage sites in Palestine. They were authored either by pilgrims, or by writers who recycled material from existing works.

== Souvenir icon for Holy Land pilgrims ==
Large icons painted on canvas and sold as souvenirs to Orthodox Christian pilgrims to the Holy Land. They depicted a topographic overview of Christian holy sites, with the walled city of Jerusalem and the Church of the Holy Sepulchre placed at the centre. They represent the most visually attractive genre of the flourishing local icon industry from the late Ottoman period, 19th-century artists from Palestine dominating the pilgrim souvenir production also in Egypt and Syria. Possibly first created in the second half of the 17th century, the oldest specimen preserved among the several hundred surviving examples is from 1704. In the first half of the 19th century the pattern changed, replacing the topographic depiction with a patchwork of icons, still centred around the Church of the Holy Sepulchre and the Holy Fire ceremony, but surrounded by scenes from the life of Christ and the Akathistos Hymn of the Theotokos. Cheap prints rang death knell of the painted proskynetaria by the end the 19th century.
