= Saparevo =

Coordinates: 42.3029°N 23.2917°E

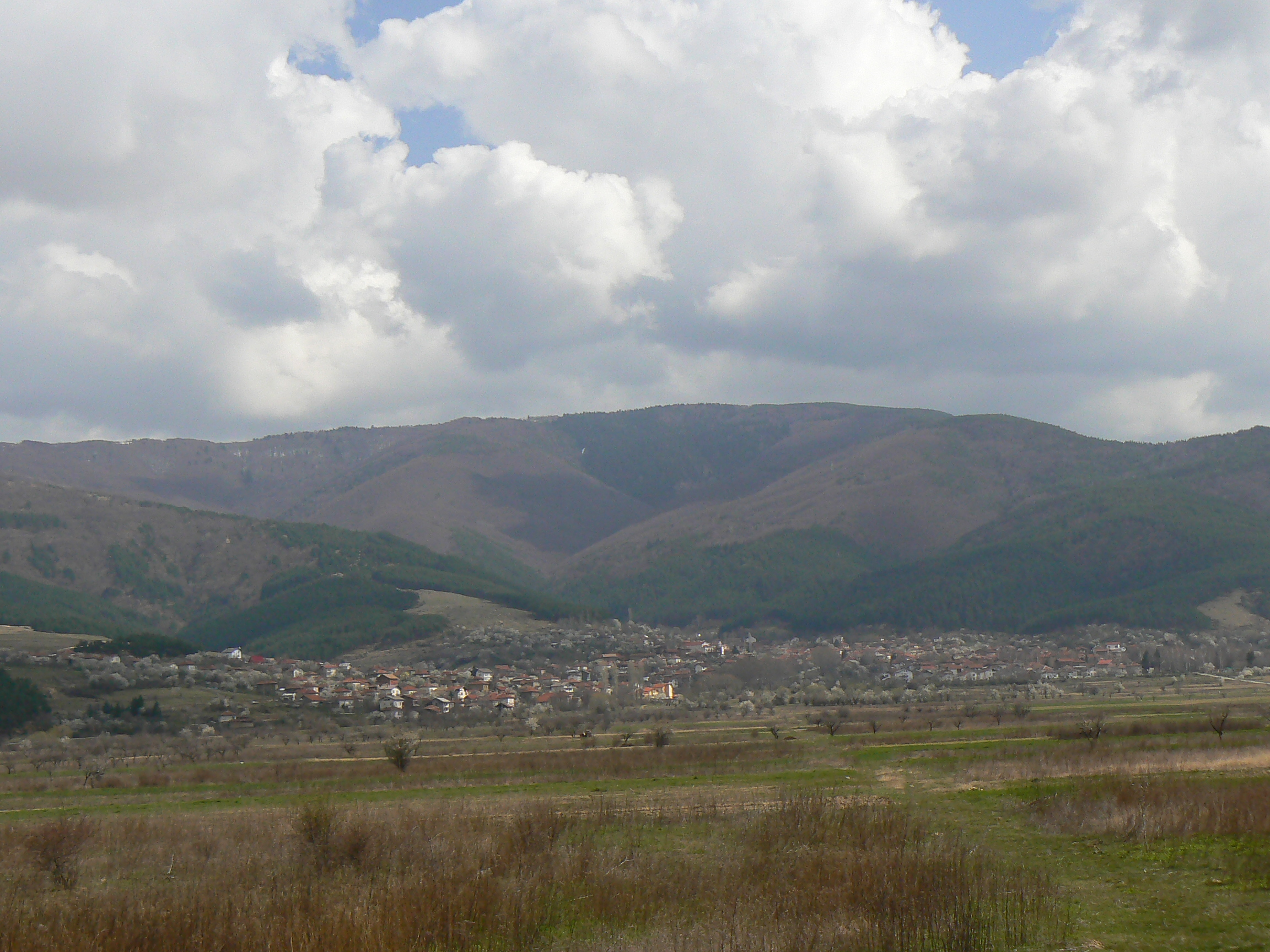
- Saparevo village, Kystendil district, Bulgaria
- Interactive map of Saparevo

Saparevo (Bulgarian: Сапарево) is a village in Sapareva Banya Municipality, Kyustendil Province, Bulgaria, near Sapareva Banya .
