= Sapareva Banya =

Sapareva Banya Сапарева баня
- Town
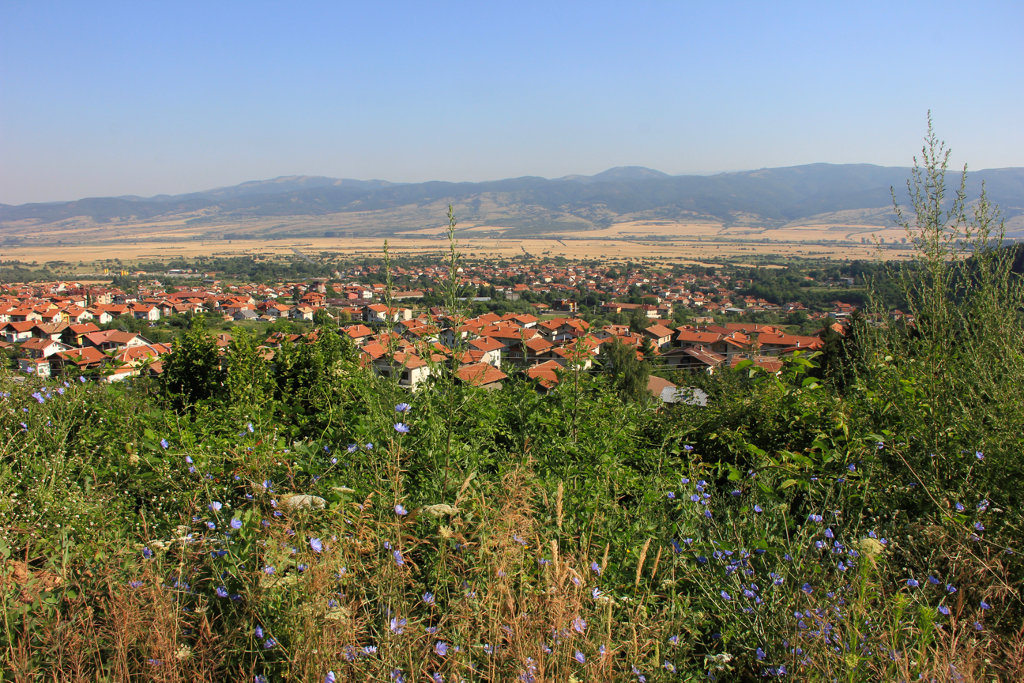
- View of Sapareva Banya

- Location of Sapareva Banya
- Coordinates: 42°17′N 23°16′E
- Country: Bulgaria
- Province (Oblast): Kyustendil
- Municipality: Sapareva Banya

Government
  - Mayor: Sasho Ivanov
- Elevation: 983 m (3,225 ft)

Population (13.09.2005)
  - Total: 4,425
- Time zone: UTC+2 (EET)
  - Summer (DST): UTC+3 (EEST)
- Postal Code: 2650
- Area code: 0707
- License Plate: KH
- Website: www.saparevabanya.bg

Sapareva Banya (Bulgarian: Сапарева баня, transliterated Sapareva banya) is a town in southwestern Bulgaria, part of Kyustendil Province. As Ancient Germanеia (in Dacia), a former bishopric, it is a Latin Catholic titular see.

It is located at the north foot of the Rila mountains, 15 kilometers east of Dupnitsa. The town is known for its hot mineral (103 °C (217 °F)) and clear mountain water, as well as the geyser in the town centre that sprang forth in 1957.

== History ==
The former Roman town of Germania (in Dacia) or Germane once stood at the location of modern Sapareva Banya and in the 3rd century was an important town in Dacia Mediterranea province.

According to Synecdemus, compiled prior to 535 by the Byzantine geographer Hierocles, the town was in Dacia Mediterranea province in Illyricum diocese, and the name was spelled in koine Greek as Γέρμαι (Germe) or as Γερμάη (Germai).

It was mentioned in the 6th century as Γερμανία, Γερμανός, Γέρμεννε and in various later sources, like Notitie Episcopatum, in the Leo VI the Wise's edition of a VII century notitia.

This, or possibly Germen, was the birthplace of the great Byzantine general Belisarius.

In 11th-century it was listed as Γερμάνεια (Germaneia) in the first of the three charters of Byzantine Emperor Basil II (Porphyrogenitus/ the Young).

== Ecclesiastical history ==
=== Before the Great schism ===
Germania in Dacia was important enough in the late Roman province of Dacia Mediterranea to become a suffragan bishopric of the Metropolitan Archdiocese of Sardica in the provincial capital (now Sofia), in the sway of the Patriarchate of Constantinople. However, possibly due to the Huns, the bishopric faded away, and no historical resident Bishop of Germania is recorded afterwards.

At the demotion of the Bulgarian Patriarchate of Ohrid to the Archbishopric of Ohrid in 1018/1019, Germaneia is listed under the Velbazhd episcopate, according to the first of the three charters of emperor Basil II.

=== Catholic titular see ===
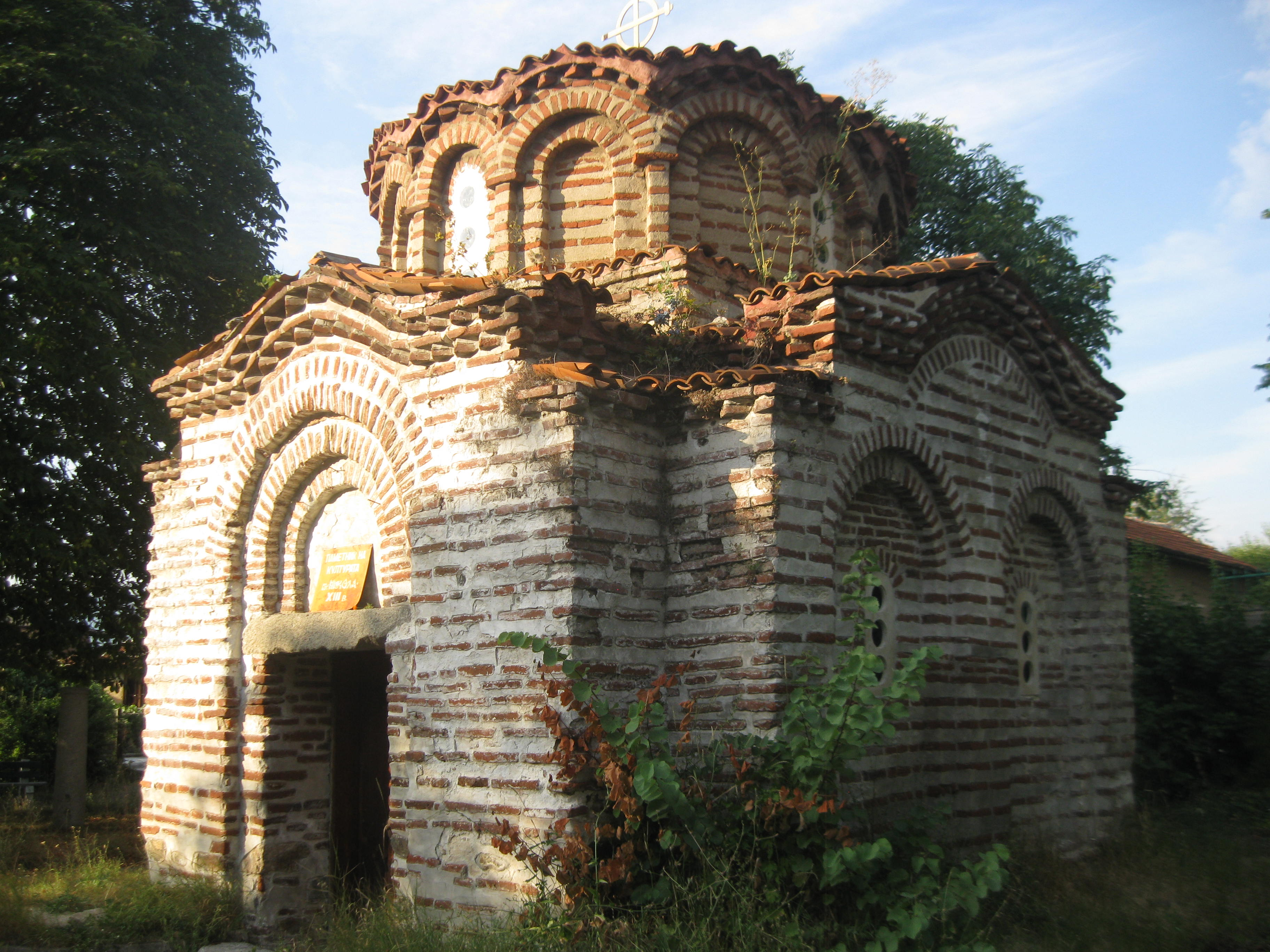
The medieval Orthodox St Nicholas Church in Sapareva Banya

The diocese was nominally restored in 1933 as Latin Titular bishopric of Germania in Dacia (Latin) / Germania di Dacia (Curiate Italian) / Germanien(sis) in Dacia (Latin adjective).

It has been vacant for decades, with only the following incumbents:

- Octavio Betancourt Arango (1970.11.23 – 1975.11.10) as Auxiliary Bishop of Archdiocese of Medellin (Colombia) (1970.11.23 – 1975.11.10); later Bishop of Garzón (Colombia) (1975.11.10 – retired 1977.04.26)
- Dante Carlos Sandrelli (born Italy) (1976.01.02 – 1978.03.31) as Auxiliary Bishop of Diocese of Formosa (Argentina) (1976.01.02 – 1978.03.31); later succeeded as Bishop of Formosa (1978.03.31 – retired 1998.01.14).

== Municipality ==
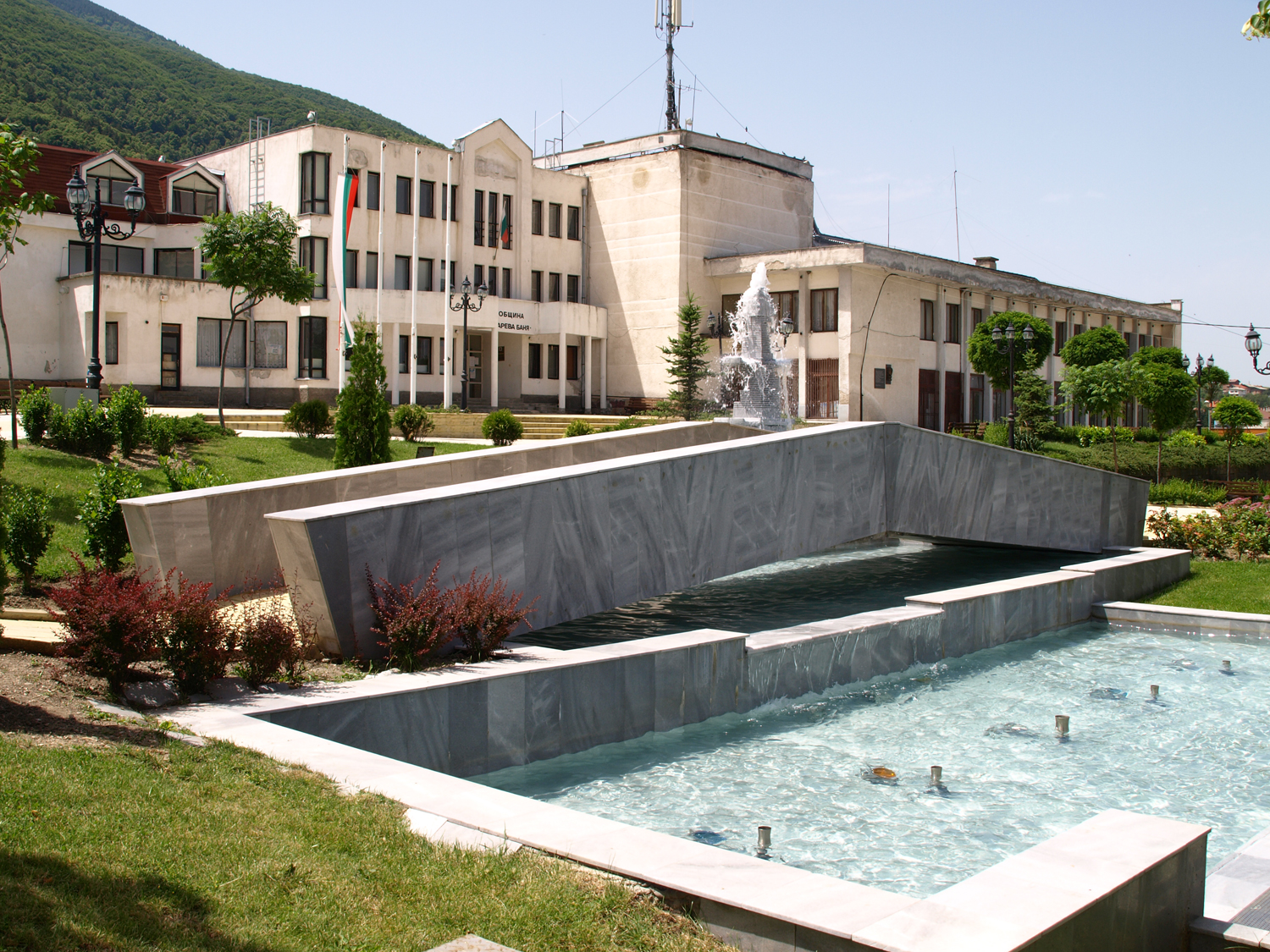
Sapareva Banya Town-hall

Sapareva Banya is also the seat of Sapareva Banya municipality (part of Kyustendil Province), which includes the following 3 villages:

- Ovchartsi
- Resilovo
- Saparevo

=== Religion ===
According to the latest Bulgarian census of 2011, the religious composition, among those who answered the optional question on religious identification, was the following:

Religious composition of Sapareva Banya Municipality
Orthodox Christianity	97.4%
Catholicism	0.2%
Protestantism	0.0%
Islam	0.0%
No religion	0.5%
Prefer not to answer, others and indefinable	1.9%

== Modern names and eponymy ==
- Saparevo's modern name, first attested in 1570, is probably derived from the noun tsapar ("woodchopper"), from the dialectal verb tsaparim (цапарим), "to chop, to cut". Some authors suggest an etymology from the Thracian *Sapara.
- The modern name first appears as Bane in 1576. Later on, it was disambiguated by adding the name of the nearby village of Saparevo: the area is rich in mineral springs and many localities have similar names.
- Saparevo Glacier on Smith Island, South Shetland Islands (Atlantic near the Antarctic) is named after Saparevo.

== Sights ==
The 12th-13th-century St Nicholas Church, the 18th-century St George's Church from the Bulgarian National Revival and the Forty Martyrs Church from 1859 are located in Sapareva Banya.

== Balneotherapy ==
Mineral water of Separeva banya was highly regarded and used as a cure by Thracians and Romans. Saparevian mineral water is clear, colorless, with smell of hydrogen sulfide, hyperthermal (temperature 103 °C), hydrocarbonate, sulphate-sodium, fluorine, silicon and sulphide. Hydrogen sulfide is 15,5 mg / L. It is claimed that the water treats disorders of the musculoskeletal system, nervous system, and upper respiratory tract, and metal poisoning.

== Notable locals ==
- Flavius Belisarius, the famous Roman general, was born in Germania, the Roman precursor of Sapareva Banya.

== See also ==
- List of Catholic dioceses in Bulgaria

== Sources and external links ==
- www.saparevabanya.bg, official municipality website
- GCatholic titular see Germania in Dacia
- Sapareva.hit.bg
