= Saint Pantaleon =

Christian martyr and saint

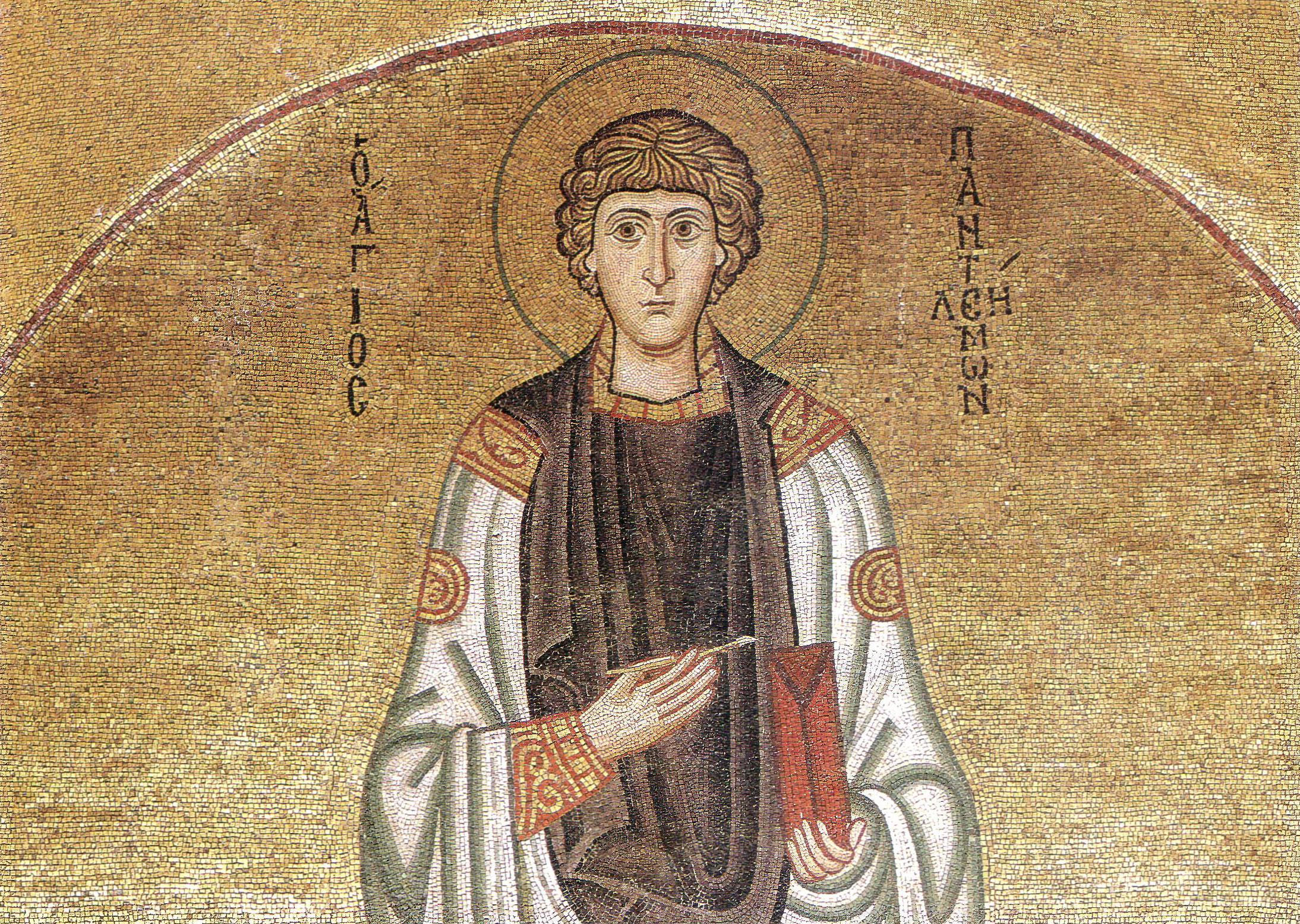
- Early 11th-century Byzantine mosaic of Saint Panteleimon in the Hosios Loukas Monastery, Greece

Great-Martyr Unmercenary Healer
- Born: c. 275; Nicomedia (modern-day Izmit, Kocaeli, Turkey)
- Died: c. 305; Nicomedia (modern-day Izmit, Kocaeli, Turkey)
- Venerated in: Eastern Orthodox Church; Anglicanism; Oriental Orthodox Church; Catholic Church
- Major shrine: Pantaleon Monastery in the Jordan desert; Pantaleon Church built by Emperor Justinian in the 6th century, Constantinople
- Feast: 27 July (Western Christianity, Byzantine Christianity); 19 Epip (Coptic Christianity)
- Attributes: A compartmented apothecary's (medicine) box, with a long-handled spatula or spoon; a martyr's cross
- Patronage: Physicians, apothecaries, midwives, livestock, lottery, lottery winners and victories, lottery tickets; invoked against headaches, consumption, locusts, witchcraft, accidents and loneliness; helper for crying children

Pantaleon (Greek: Παντελεήμων, romanized: Panteleïmon, lit. 'All-compassionate'; c. 275 – 305 AD) was a Christian martyr from Nicomedia in Bithynia who was executed during the Diocletianic Persecution in 305 AD. In Western Christianity, he is venerated as one of the Fourteen Holy Helpers, a group of saints especially venerated during the Late Middle Ages, while in Eastern Christianity he is regarded as one of the Holy Unmercenary Healers.

== Life of Pantaleon ==
According to the martyrologies, Pantaleon was the son of a rich pagan, Eustorgius of Nicomedia, and had been instructed in Christianity by his Christian mother, Eubula; however, after her death he fell away from the Christian church, while he studied medicine with a renowned physician Euphrosinos; under the patronage of Euphrosinos he became physician to the emperor, Maximian (or alternatively Galerius).

He was won back to Christianity by Hermolaus of Nicomedia (characterized as a bishop of the church at Nicomedia in the later literature), who convinced him that Christ was the better physician, signalling the significance of the exemplum of Pantaleon that faith is to be trusted over medical advice.

Alphonsus Liguori wrote regarding this incident:

He studied medicine with such success, that the Emperor Maximian appointed him his physician. One day as our saint was discoursing with a holy priest named Hermolaus, the latter, after praising the study of medicine, concluded thus: "But, my friend, of what use are all thy acquirements in this art, since thou art ignorant of the science of salvation?"

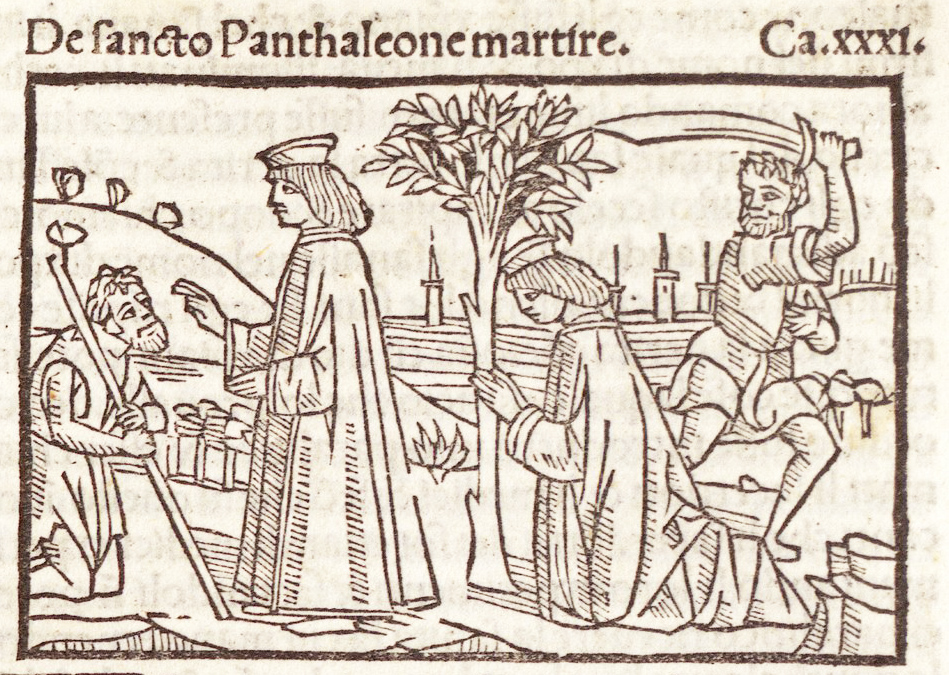
Saint Pantaleon in the Golden Legend (1497)

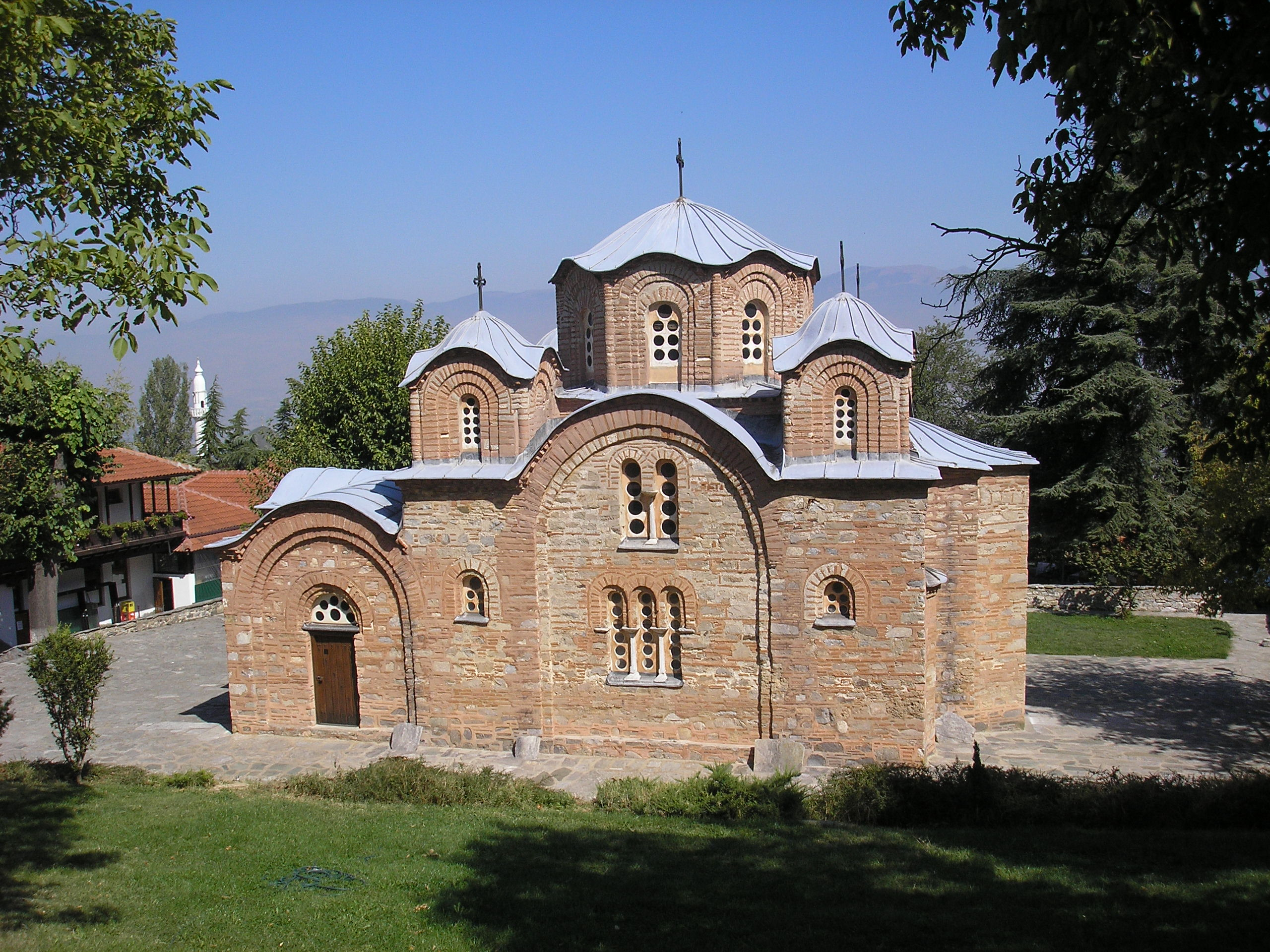
The Church of St. Panteleimon in Gorno Nerezi, Skopje, North Macedonia

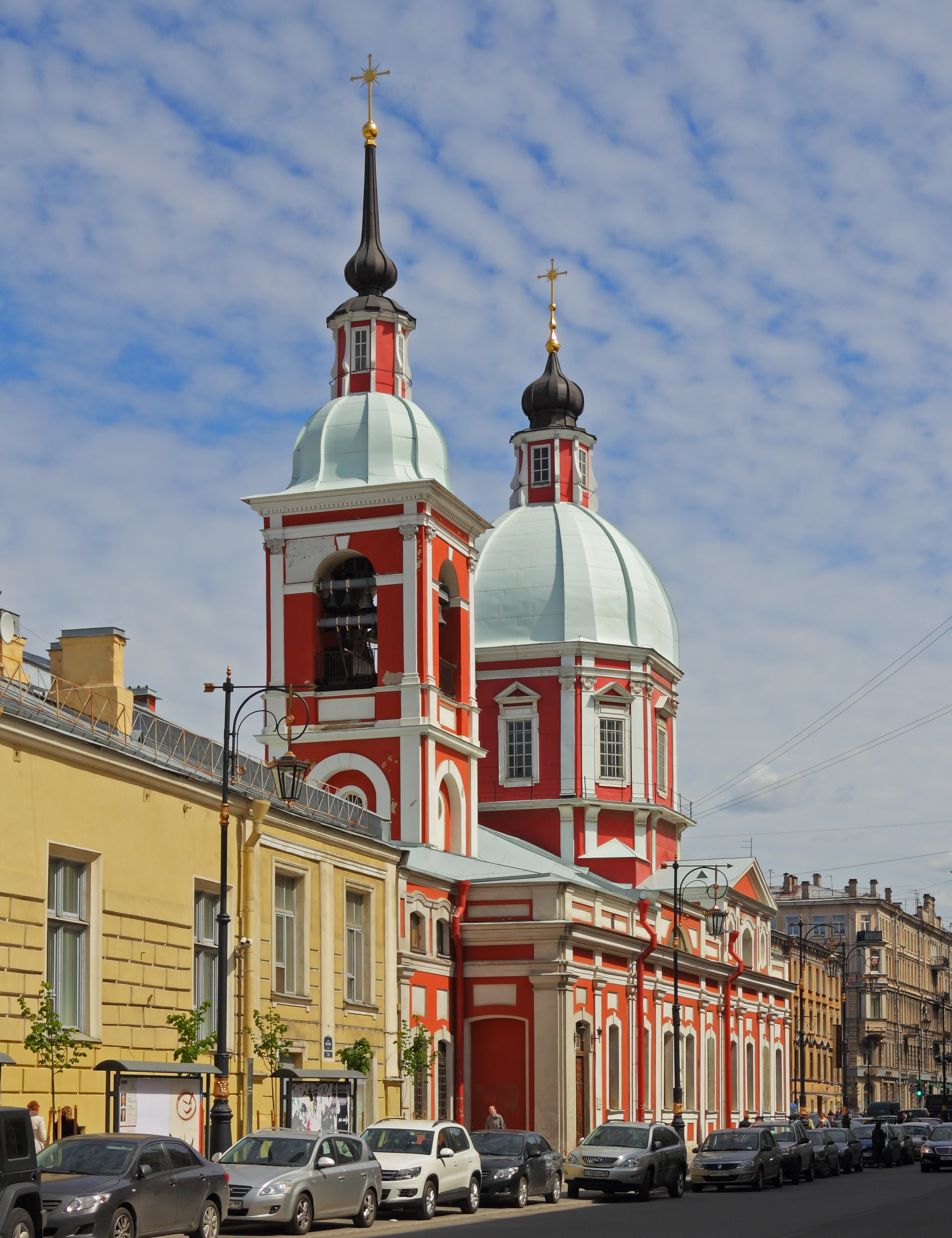
Church of St. Panteleimon, built in 1735–1739, is one of the oldest in St. Petersburg

By miraculously healing a blind man by invoking the name of Jesus over him, Pantaleon converted his father, upon whose death he came into possession of a large fortune. He freed his slaves and distributed his wealth among the poor. Envious colleagues denounced him to the emperor during the Diocletian persecution. The emperor wished to save him and sought to persuade him to apostasy. Pantaleon, however, openly confessed his faith, and as proof that Christ was the true God, he healed a paralytic. Notwithstanding this, he was condemned to death by the emperor, who regarded the miracle as an exhibition of magic.

According to the legend, Pantaleon's flesh was first burned with torches, whereupon Christ appeared to all in the form of Hermolaus to strengthen and heal Pantaleon. The torches were extinguished. Then a bath of molten lead was prepared; when the apparition of Christ stepped into the cauldron with him, the fire went out and the lead became cold. Pantaleon was now thrown into the sea, loaded with a great stone, which floated. He was thrown to wild beasts, but these fawned upon him and could not be forced away until he had blessed them. He was bound on the wheel, but the ropes snapped, and the wheel broke. An attempt was made to behead him, but the sword bent, and the executioners were converted to Christianity. Pantaleon implored Heaven to forgive them, for which reason he also received the name of Panteleimon ("mercy for everyone" or "all-compassionate"). He was then beheaded.

Alphonsus wrote about his blood relic changing state:

At Ravello, a city in the kingdom of Naples, there is a vial of his blood, which becomes blood every year [on his feastday], and may be seen in this state interspersed with the milk, as I, the author of this work, have seen it.

== Early veneration ==
The vitae containing these miraculous features are all late in date and "valueless" according to the Catholic Encyclopedia. Yet the fact of his martyrdom itself seems to be supported by a veneration for which there is testimony in the 5th century, among others in a sermon on the martyrs by Theodoret (died c. 457); Procopius of Caesarea (died c. 565?), writing on the churches and shrines constructed by Justinian I tells that the emperor rebuilt the shrine to Pantaleon at Nicomedia; and there is mention of Pantaleon in the Martyrologium Hieronymianum.

Pantaleon is a patron saint of physicians and of midwives, and is invoked against consumption. He is depicted as a beardless young man holding a book with a cross on it.

== Veneration in the East ==
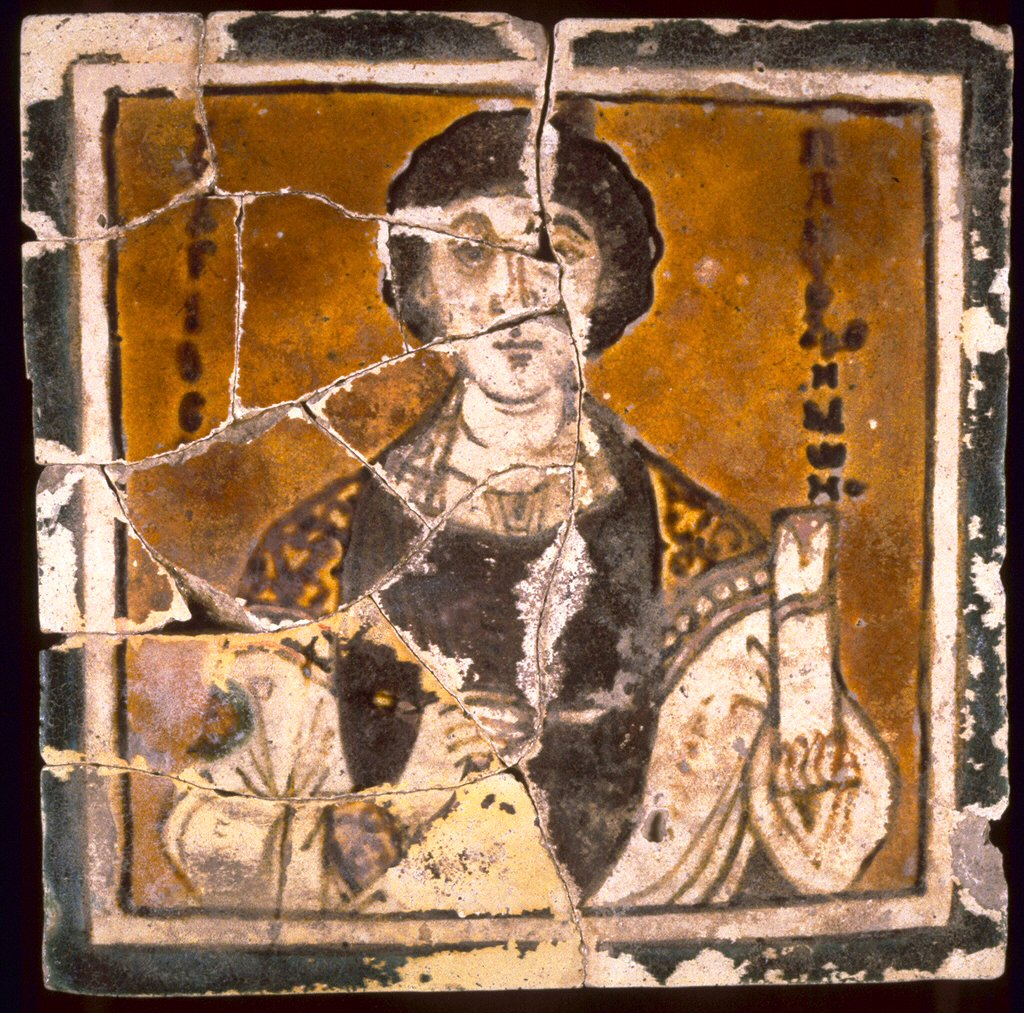
Panteleimon, shown here with a lancet in his right hand. This Byzantine tile from the 10th century probably formed a frieze on a church wall or altar screen. The Walters Art Museum.

The Eastern tradition concerning Pantaleon broadly follows the medieval Western hagiographic tradition, but differs in some details of the account of his martyrdom. It states that Hermolaus was still alive while Pantaleon's torture was under way, but was martyred himself shortly before Pantaleon's beheading along with two companions, Hermippas and Thermocrates.

Pantaleon's relics, venerated at Nicomedia, were transferred to Constantinople. Numerous churches, shrines, and monasteries have been named for him; in the West most often as Pantaleon and in the East as Panteleimon; to him is consecrated the St. Panteleimon Monastery at Mount Athos, Agios Panteleimon Monastery in Crete, St. Panteleimon Monastery in Myrtou, Cyprus, and the 12th-century Church of St. Panteleimon in Gorno Nerezi, North Macedonia.

According to Movses Kaghankatvatsi, his relics were brought to a church built in the town of Tsri (then Caucasian Albania, near modern Barda, Azerbaijan) by Grigoris. Catholicos Lazar of Albania built the Church of St. Pantaleon in his honor in Beghame'j (near modern Ağcabədi, Azerbaijan). King Vachagan III of Albania rediscovered his remains and interred them in the Amaras Monastery, located in modern Nagorno-Karabakh, and named his firstborn son after the saint.

== Veneration in Western Europe ==
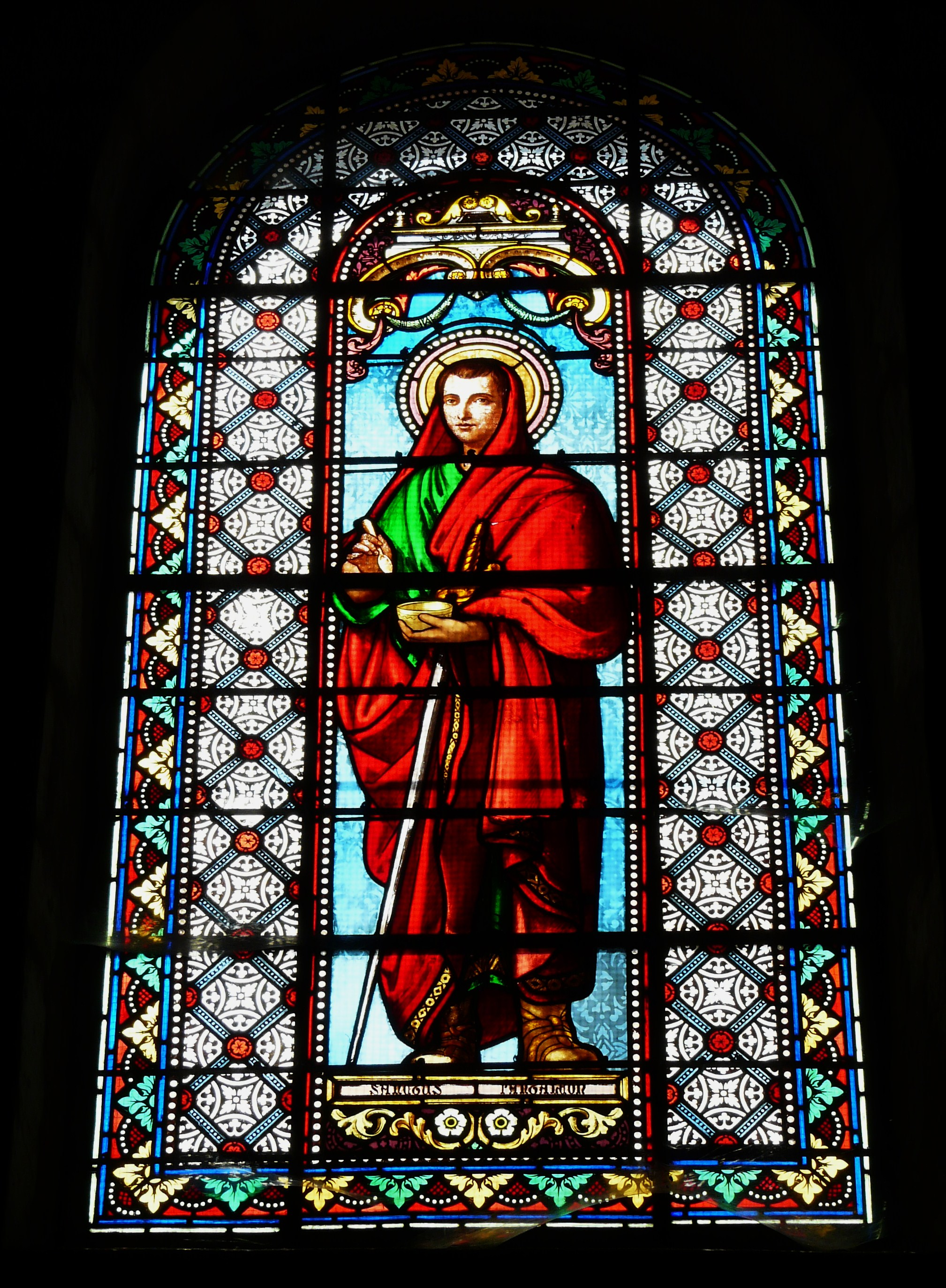
Stained glass window depicting Saint Pantaleon in the Church of Saint Pantaleon in Valeuil, France.

After the Black Death of the mid-14th century in Western Europe, as a patron saint of physicians and midwives, he came to be regarded as one of the fourteen guardian martyrs, the Fourteen Holy Helpers. Relics of Saint Pantaleon are found at Saint Denis at Paris; his head is venerated at Lyon. A Romanesque church was dedicated to him in Cologne in the 9th century at the latest.

=== England ===
In the British Library there is a surviving manuscript, written in Old English, of The Life of St Pantaleon (British Library, MS Cotton Vitellius D XVII), dating from the early eleventh century, possibly written for Abbot Ælfric of Eynsham. The Canons' Vestry off the south transept of Chichester Cathedral was formerly a square-plan chapel dedicated to Saint Pantaleon – it was possibly under construction just before the cathedral's great fire of 1187.

=== France ===
In France, he was depicted in a window in Chartres Cathedral. In southern France there are six communes under the protective name of Saint-Pantaléon. Though there are individual churches consecrated to him elsewhere, there are no communes named for him in the north or northwest of France. The six are:

- Saint-Pantaléon, in the Lot département, Midi-Pyrénées
- Saint-Pantaléon, in the Vaucluse département, Provence – a wine-growing village
- Saint-Pantaléon-de-Lapleau, in the Corrèze département, Limousin
- Saint-Pantaléon-de-Larche, in the Corrèze département, at the border of Périgord and Quercy
- Saint-Pantaléon-les-Vignes, in the Drôme département, Rhône-Alpes – a wine-growing village that is part of the Côtes du Rhône vineyard region
- Saint-Pantaléon, in the Saône-et-Loire département, Bourgogne – administratively linked to Autun, bishopric see

=== Germany ===
The Church of Saint Pantaleon in Cologne is a 10th-century Romanesque church, commissioned by the niece of the Byzantine emperor Theophanu, who married the Holy Roman Emperor Otto II in 972. It is the oldest church of the cult of Saint Pantaleon west of Byzantium.

At the Basilica of the Vierzehnheiligen near Staffelstein in Franconia, Saint Pantaleon is venerated with his hands nailed to his head, reflecting another legend about his death.

=== Italy ===
In Italy, Saint Pantaleon (Italian: San Pantaleone or San Pantaleo) is said to give favourable lottery numbers, victories and winners in dreams. A phial containing some of his blood was long preserved at Ravello. On the feast day of the saint, the blood was said to become fluid and to bubble (cf. Saint Januarius). Paolo Veronese's painting of Pantaleon can be found in the church of San Pantalon in Venice; it shows the saint healing a child. Another painting of Pantaleon by Fumiani is also in the same church.

He was depicted in an 8th-century fresco in Santa Maria Antiqua in Rome, and in a 10th-century cycle of pictures in the crypt of San Crisogono in Rome. In Calabria, there is a small town named Papanice, after Pantaleon. Each year on his feast day, a statue of the saint is carried through the town to give a blessing for all those who seek it.

Churches named for him include:

- San Pantaleo Cathedral, better known as Dolianova Cathedral, in Sardinia
- San Pantaleo, Rome, a neoclassical church in central Rome
- San Pantaleone Martire, a 17th-century church in Dorsoduro, Venice known as San Pantalon

==== Venice ====
Pantaleon (Venetian: San Pantalon) was a popular saint in Venice, and may have given his name to a character in the commedia dell'arte, Pantalone, a silly, wizened old man (Shakespeare's "lean and slippered Pantaloon") who was a caricature of Venetians. This character was portrayed as wearing trousers rather than knee breeches, and so became the origin of the name of a type of trouser called pantalone, which was later shortened to pants.

In Dorsoduro, there is the Church of Saint Pantaleon the Martyr, popularly known by its Venetian name San Pantalon.

=== Portugal ===
Saint Pantaleon (Portuguese: São Pantaleão) is one of the patron saints of the city of Porto in Portugal, together with John the Baptist and Our Lady of Vendôme. Part of his relics were brought by Armenian refugees to the city after the Turkish occupation of Constantinople in 1453. Later, in 1499, these relics were transferred from the Church of Saint Peter of Miragaia to the cathedral, where they have been kept to this day.

== Eponym ==
- Portuguese explorer Bartolomeu Dias, the first European known to have sailed around the Cape of Good Hope, took a ship named São Pantaleão on that expedition.
- The Russian battleship Potemkin was renamed Panteleimon following her recovery after the mutiny of 1905
- Pantaleon is the eponym of the character Pantalaimon in Philip Pullman's His Dark Materials series of novels

== See also ==
- Saint Pantaleon, patron saint archive
