= Church of St. Panteleimon, Gorno Nerezi =

Church of Saint Panteleimon
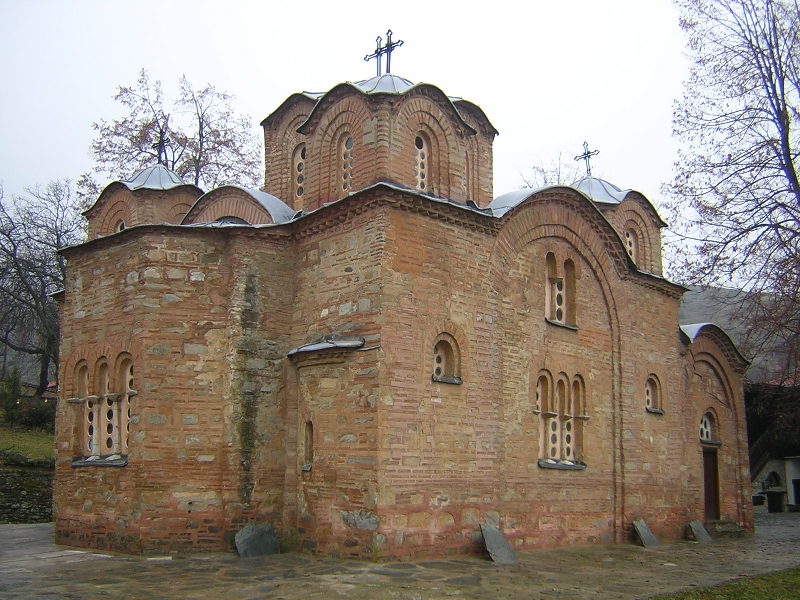
- Church of Saint Panteleimon
- 41.977°N 21.374°E
- Location: Gorno Nerezi
- Country: North Macedonia
- Denomination: Eastern Orthodox

History
- Founded: 1164

Architecture
- Style: Byzantine

The Church of Saint Panteleimon (Macedonian: Црква Свети Пантелеjмон, romanized: Crkva Sveti Pantelejmon) in Gorno Nerezi, North Macedonia, is a small 12th-century Byzantine church located in a monastery complex. Built in 1164, is dedicated to the patron saint of physicians, St. Panteleimon. Though damaged by an earthquake in the 1500s, the church has several notable frescos from the Komnenian-era of Byzantine art. Frescos were painted over in 1885 as part of a restoration attempt, but restored in 1923.

The church's stucco decoration is depicted on the obverse of the Macedonian 50 denars banknote, issued in 1996.

== Renaissance origins ==
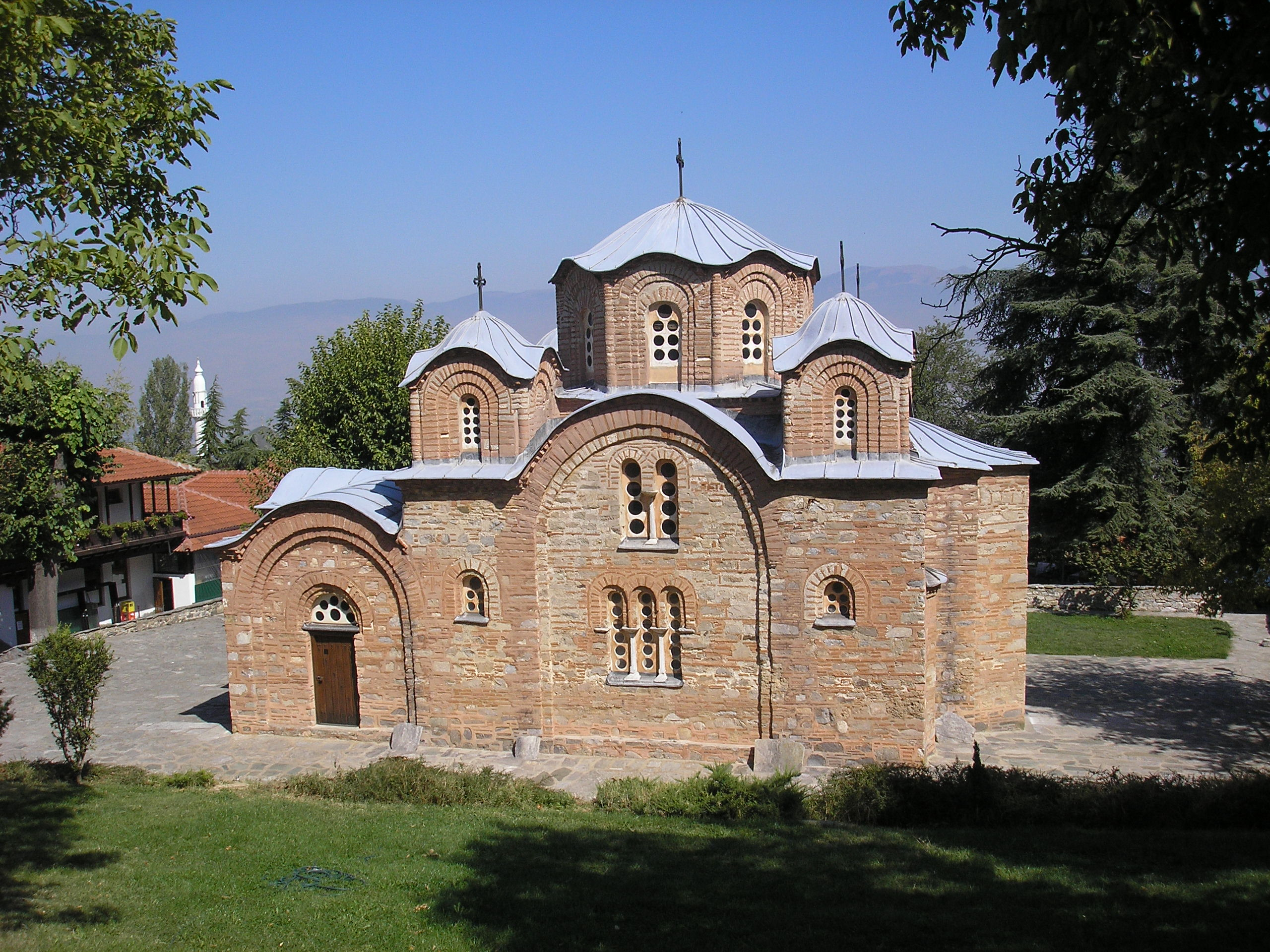
Church of St. Panteleimon

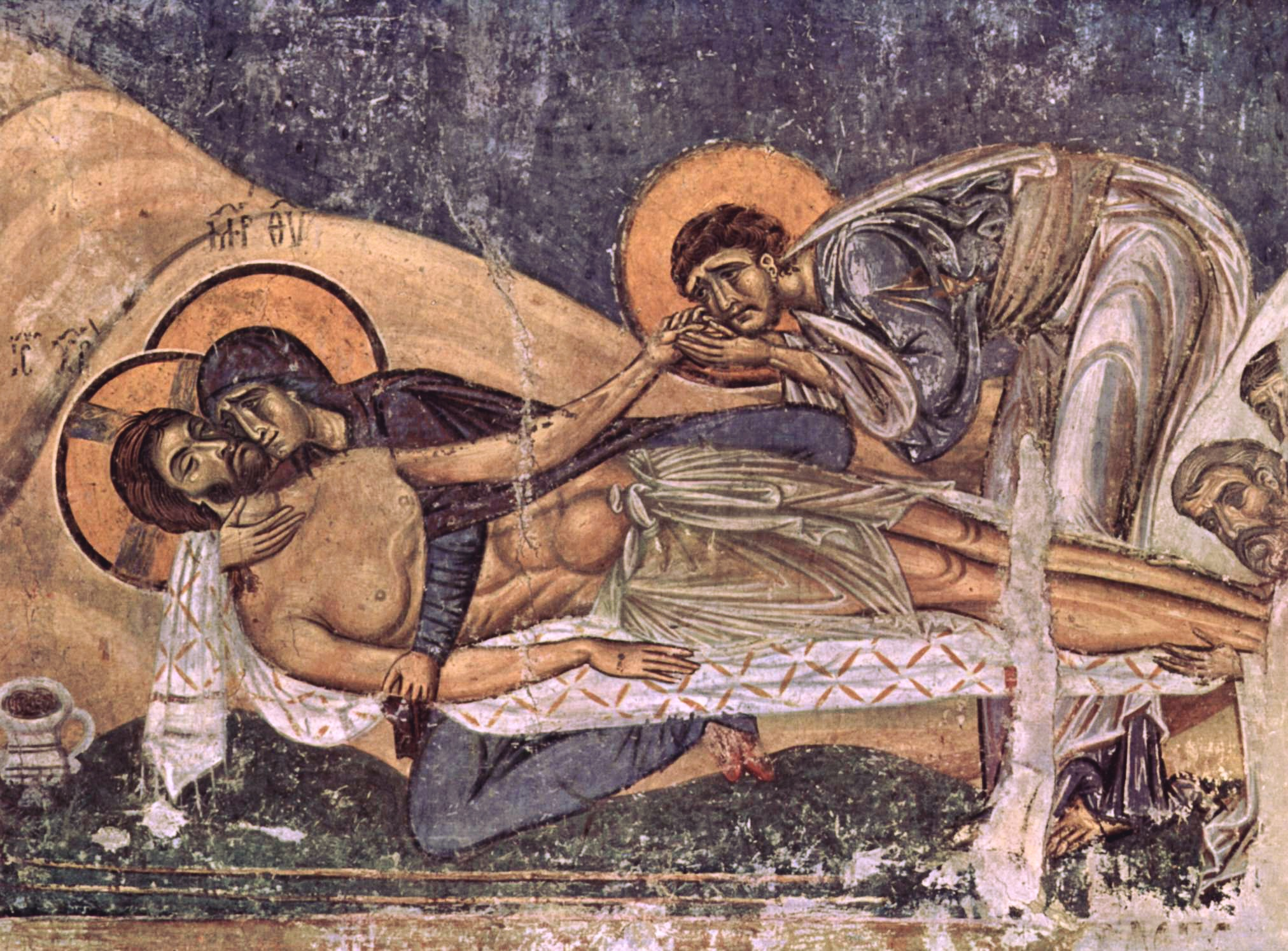
Pietà in frescoes in St. Panteleimon

According to Andrew Graham-Dixon, British art historian and writer, these frescoes with their "...physical, electric presence..." are proof that there was more to Byzantine art than the formality and otherworldliness of its mosaic and icon tradition. In his book, Graham-Dixon questions 16th century Vasari's beliefs that Giotto di Bondone finally turned fresco painting away from the primitive influence of Byzantium. The frescoes contained within St. Panteleimon at Nerezi are not seen as static, they had the capacity to change into something more obviously human and realistic, anticipating the West's emphasis on depicting Christ as a man of flesh and blood by some 150 years. The lamentation of Christ fresco is described as being a fusion of life and death in a single image as Mary movingly mourns Jesus, cradling him between her legs. Graham-Dixon reminds that these frescoes from the 1160s precede Giotto's similar emotional frescoes from the Arena Chapel in Padua, circa 1305. He concludes "...the Byzantine east played a much more formative role in the development of renaissance art than Vasari was prepared to concede".

== See also ==
- Ancient Roman and Byzantine domes
