= Gorno Nerezi =

Gorno Nerezi Горно Нерези Nerez i Epërm
- Village
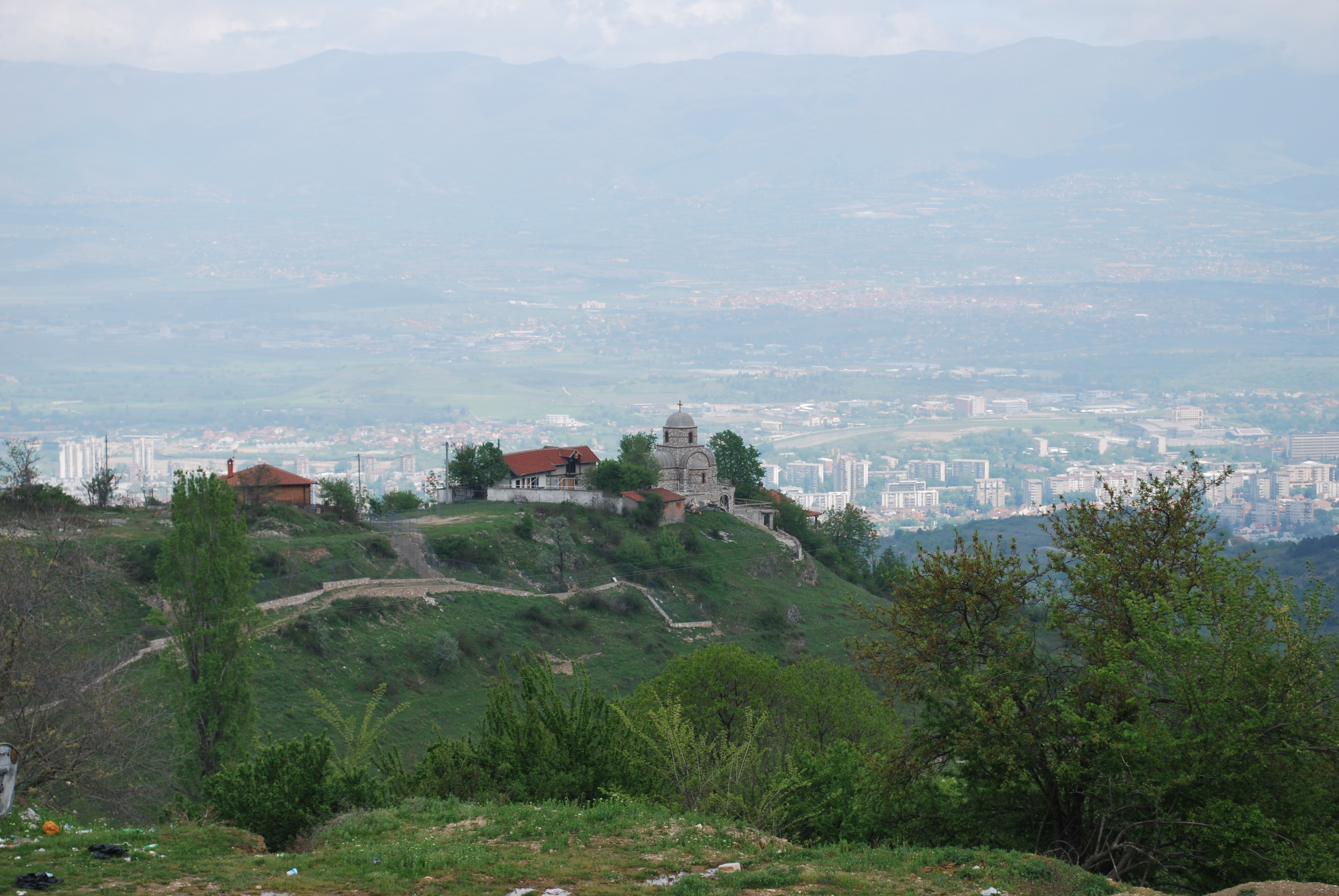

- Location within North Macedonia
- Coordinates: 41°58′44″N 21°22′23″E
- Country: North Macedonia
- Region: Skopje
- Municipality: Karpoš

Population (2002)
  - Total: 314
- Time zone: UTC+1 (CET)
  - Summer (DST): UTC+2 (CEST)
- Car plates: SK

Gorno Nerezi (Macedonian: Горно Нерези, Albanian: Nerez i Epërm) is a village in the municipality of Karpoš, North Macedonia. The settlement is situated at an altitude of 771 meters (2532 feet). It is located on the wooded slopes of Mt. Vodno, covers a 7 km radius.

Located in Gorno Nerezi is the Church of St. Panteleimon, dedicated to the protector of health. The church was constructed in 1164 by order of Alexius Angelus Comnenus, a member of the imperial family. The frescoes are famous examples of Comnenian Age Byzantine Art.

== Demographics ==
According to the 1467-68 Ottoman defter, Nerezi appears as being inhabited by an Orthodox Albanian population. Some families had a mixed Slav-Albanian anthroponomy - usually a Slavic first name and an Albanian last name or last names with Albanian patronyms and Slavic suffixes. The names are: Petko Niko son of Zogo, Tan-o son of Doka-ç, (Duka-ç), Brajko his son, Daci son of Doka-ç (Duka-ç), Niko son of Bujçun, Stepa his son, Niko son of Grop-ça, Berislav, Niko his brother, Don-ço son of Çoça.

As of the 2021 census, Gorno Nerezi had 181 residents with the following ethnic composition:

- Albanians 112
- Macedonians 51
- Others 12
- Turks 5
- Persons for whom data are taken from administrative sources 1

According to the 2002 census, the village had a total of 314 inhabitants. Ethnic groups in the village include:

- Albanians 282
- Macedonians 22
- Turks 6
- Vlachs 1
- Serbs 3
