= Walls of Thessaloniki =

UNESCO World Heritage Site
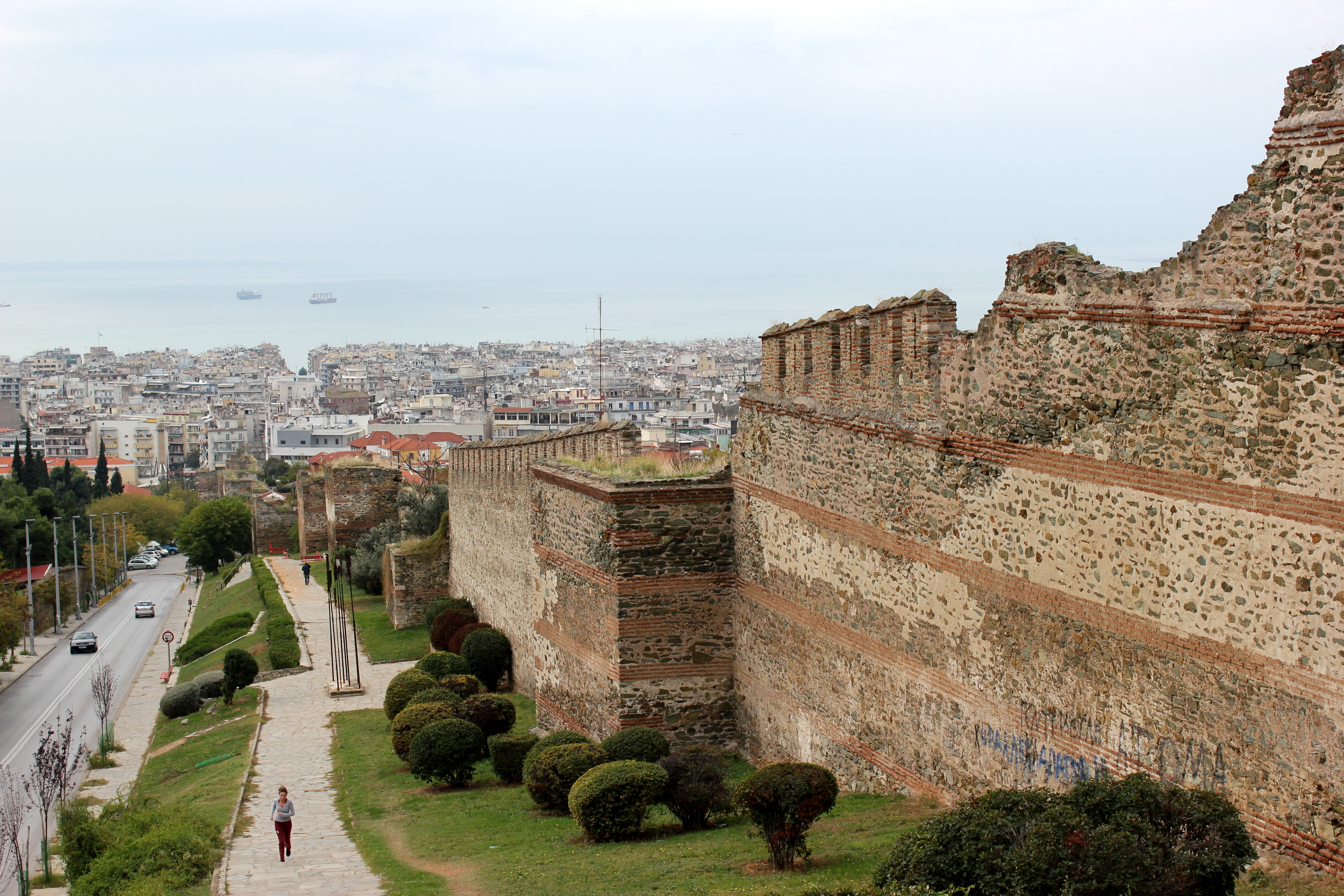
- The eastern walls

- Location within Greece
- Location: Thessaloniki, Greece
- Part of: Paleochristian and Byzantine Monuments of Thessaloniki
- Criteria: Cultural: i, ii, iv
- Reference: 456-002
- Inscription: 1988 (12th Session)
- Coordinates: 40°38′33″N 22°57′16″E

Growth of Thessaloniki and its walls in Antiquity (left) and in the late Roman and early Byzantine periods (right).

The Walls of Thessaloniki (Greek: Τείχη της Θεσσαλονίκης, Teíchi tis Thessaloníkis) are the 4 kilometer-long city walls surrounding the city of Thessaloniki during the Middle Ages and until the late 19th century, when large parts of the walls, including the entire seaward section, were demolished as part of the Ottoman authorities' restructuring of Thessaloniki's urban fabric. The city was fortified from its establishment in the late 4th century BC, but the present walls date from the early Byzantine period, ca. 390, and incorporate parts of an earlier, late 3rd-century wall. The walls consist of the typical late Roman mixed construction of ashlar masonry alternating with bands of brick. The northern part of the walls adjoins the acropolis of the city, which formed a separate fortified enceinte, and within it lies another citadel, the Heptapyrgion (Seven Towers), popularly known by the Ottoman translation of the name, Yedi Kule.

In 1988, as part of the Paleochristian and Byzantine monuments of Thessaloniki, the walls were added to the UNESCO World Heritage List because of their outstanding Byzantine architecture.

== History ==
The first fortification of the newly built city of Cassander, which played an important role, dates back to the 3rd century BC. The Roman conquest (167 BC), which brought Roman peace, made the walls weak, so around the middle of the 1st century they were already in ruins.

In the 3rd century, fortifications were built to protect the city from the Goths with materials from previous buildings. With these fortifications, two Gothic attacks were repelled, in 254 and 268. The Roman wall was 1.65 m wide, with square towers. The main street of the city (Leoforos or Mesi) extended from the Golden Gate in the west (Vardario Square) to the Cassandreot Gate in the east. The southern wall extended somewhat further south of today's Tsimiski avenue.

At the beginning of the 4th century, Galerius and Constantine the Great passed through Thessaloniki and strengthened the walls. At the end of the 4th century, a second wall was built outside the previous one with triangular projections. The wall visible today was built from the end of the 4th to the middle of the 5th century, while a subsequent improvement program was implemented in the 7th century on Heraklion in order to support the defense of the city against the Avars and the Slavs. In 904 the city was captured by the Saracens by an attack from the sea side, which led to the sea walls being strengthened after the departure of the Saracens.

== Gallery ==
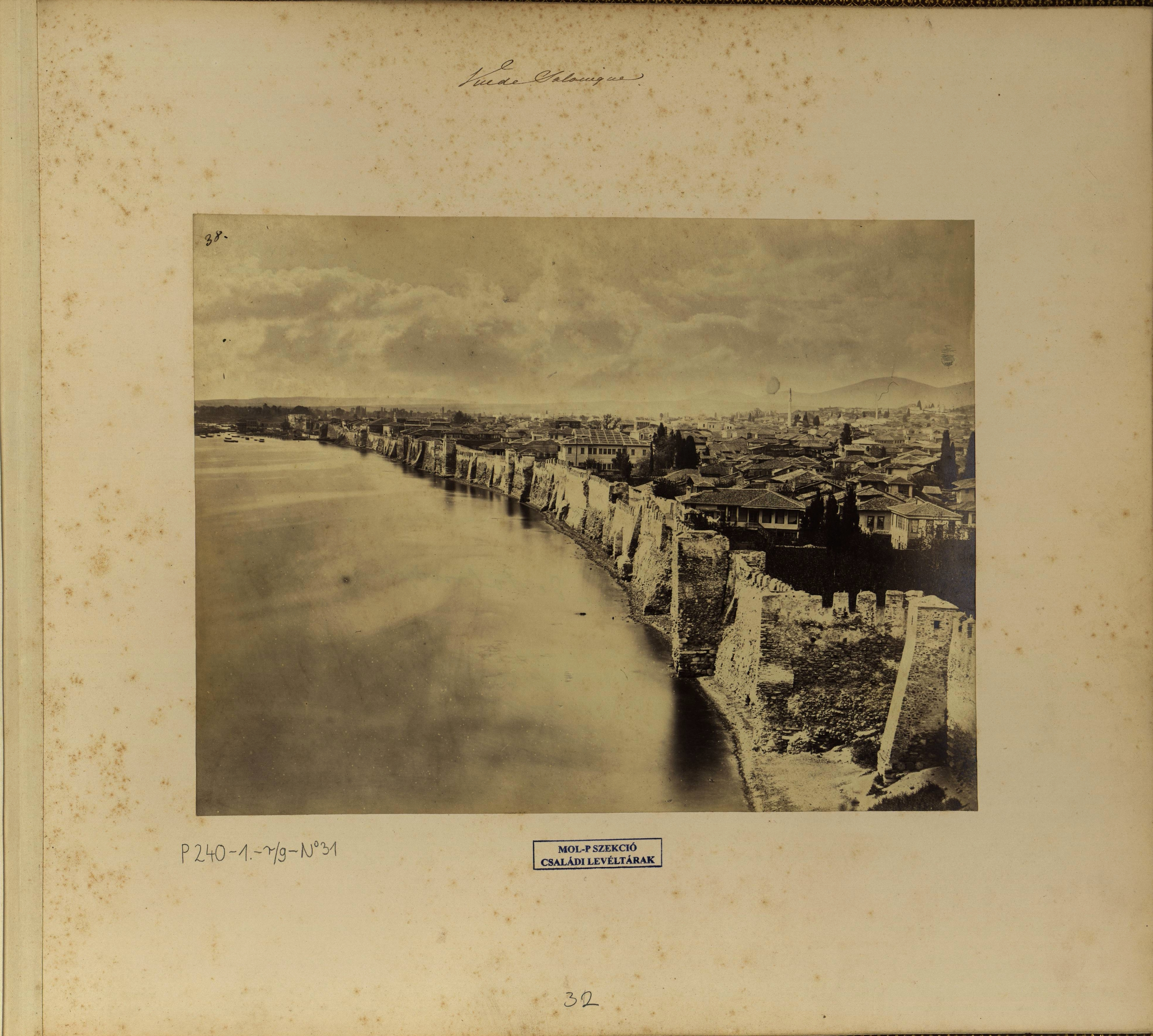
The sea walls, c. 1860

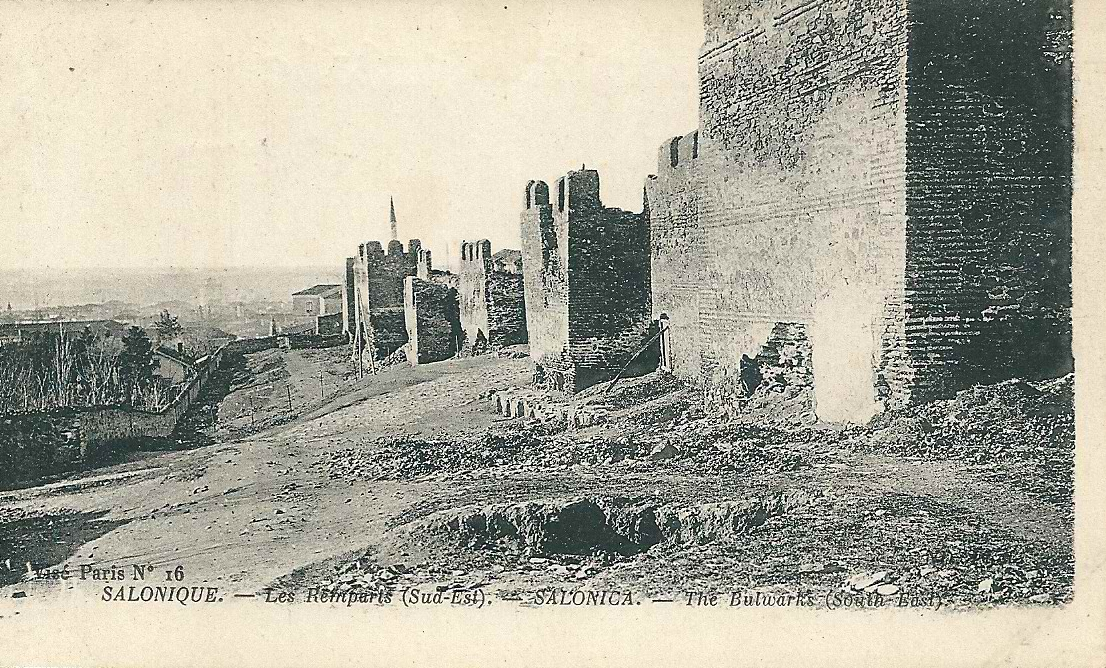
The walls c. 1919

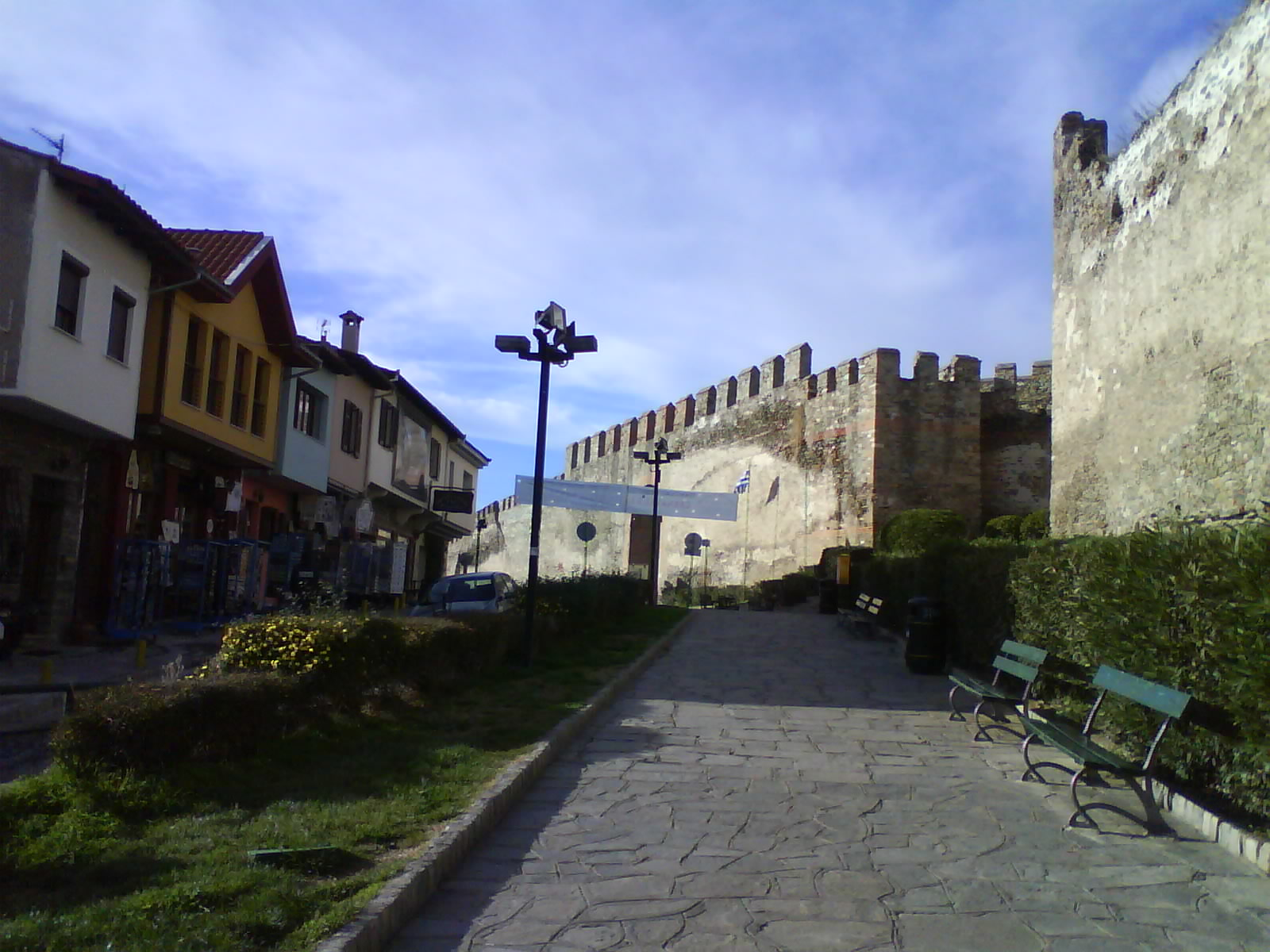
Part of the walls with one of the surviving gates on the background

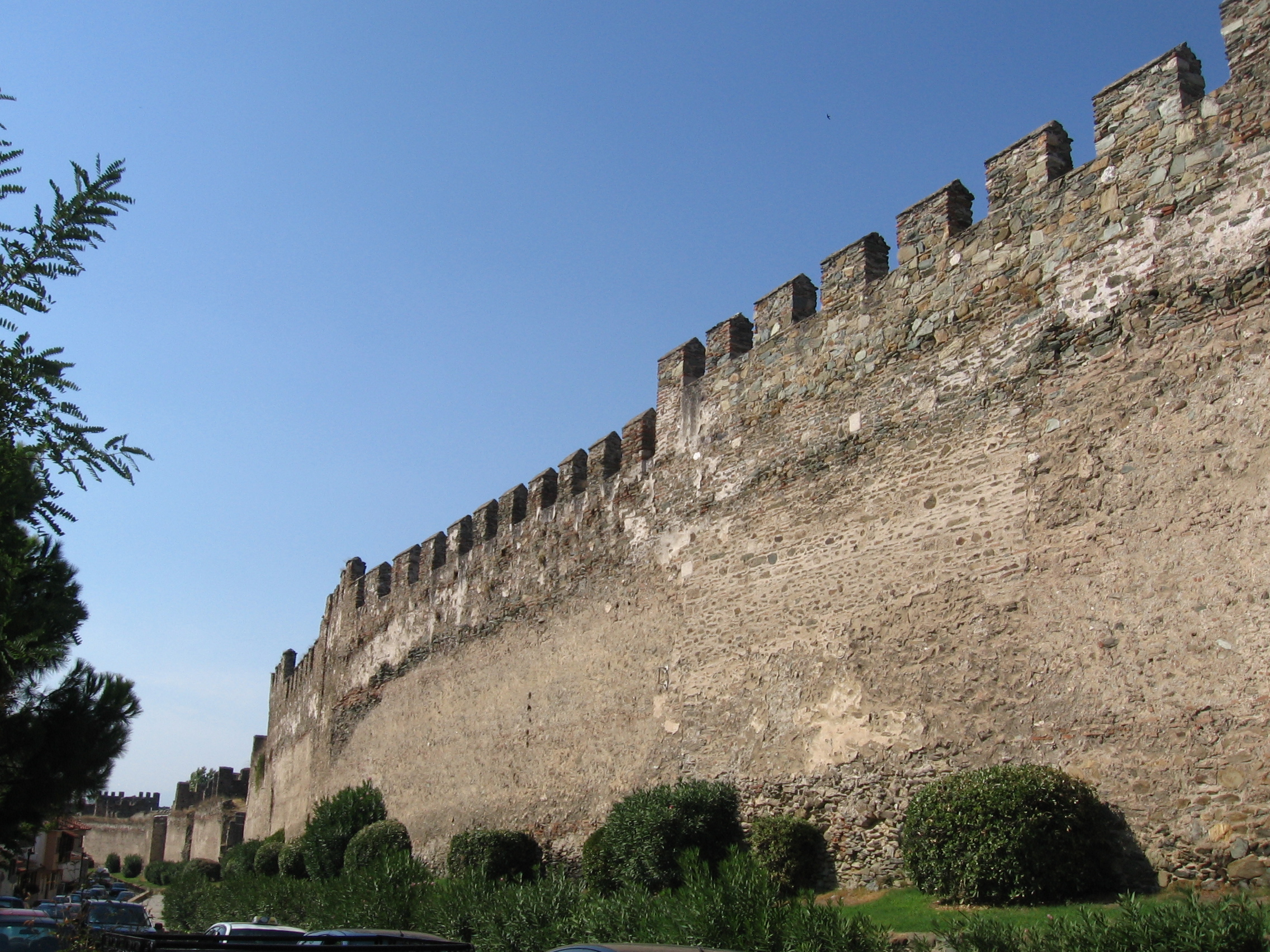
Part of the walls

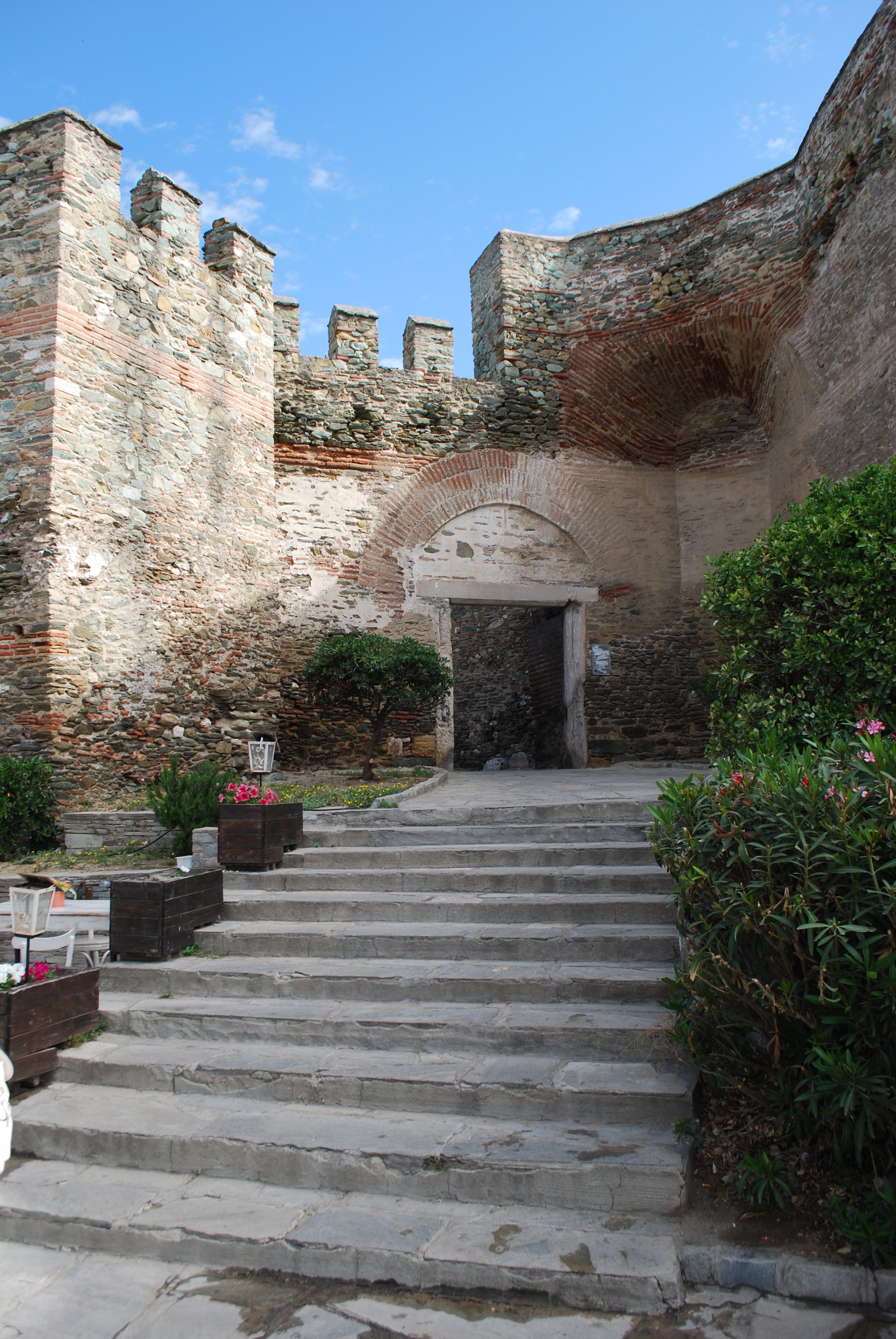
Gate of Anna Palaiologina

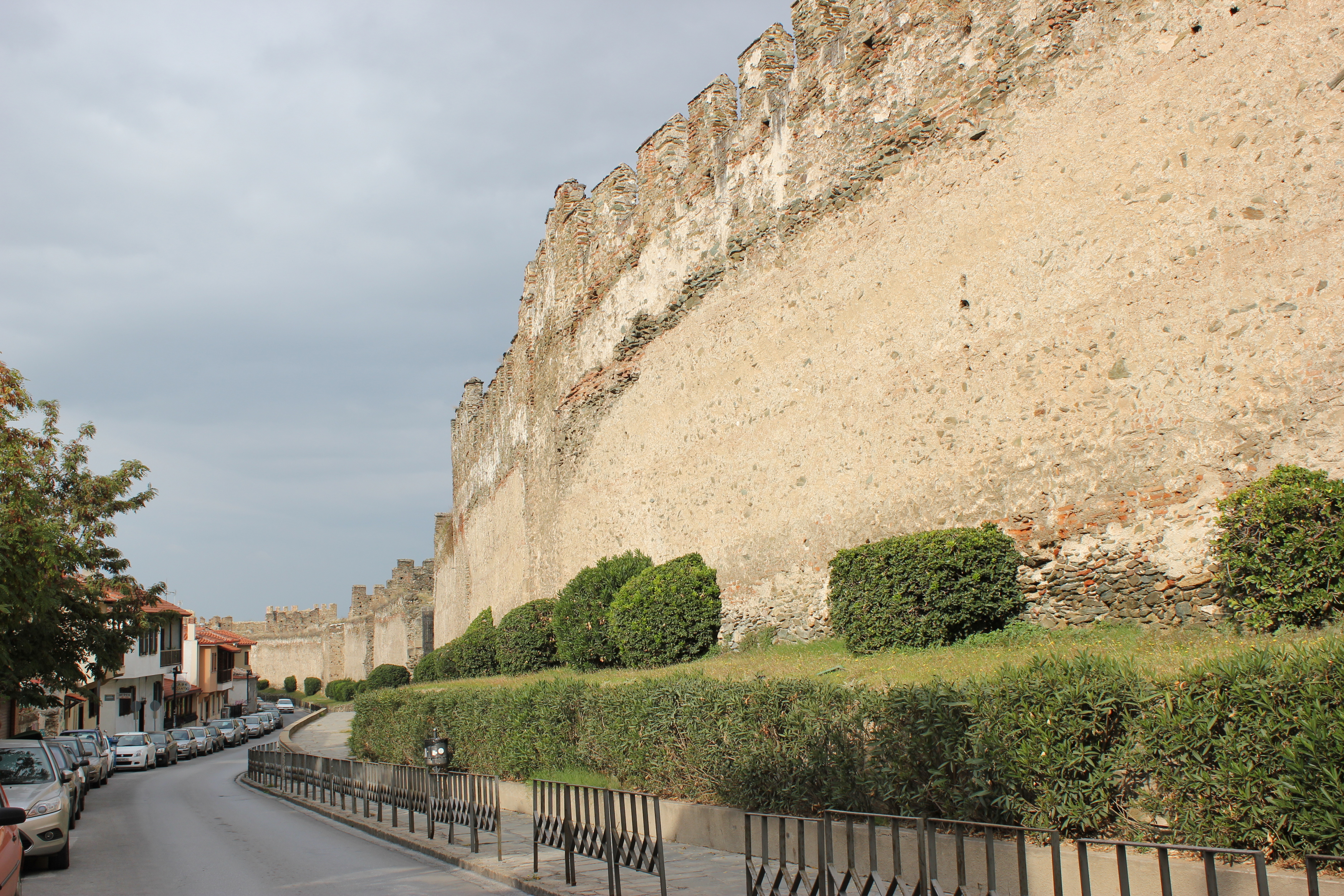
Part of the walls beside the street

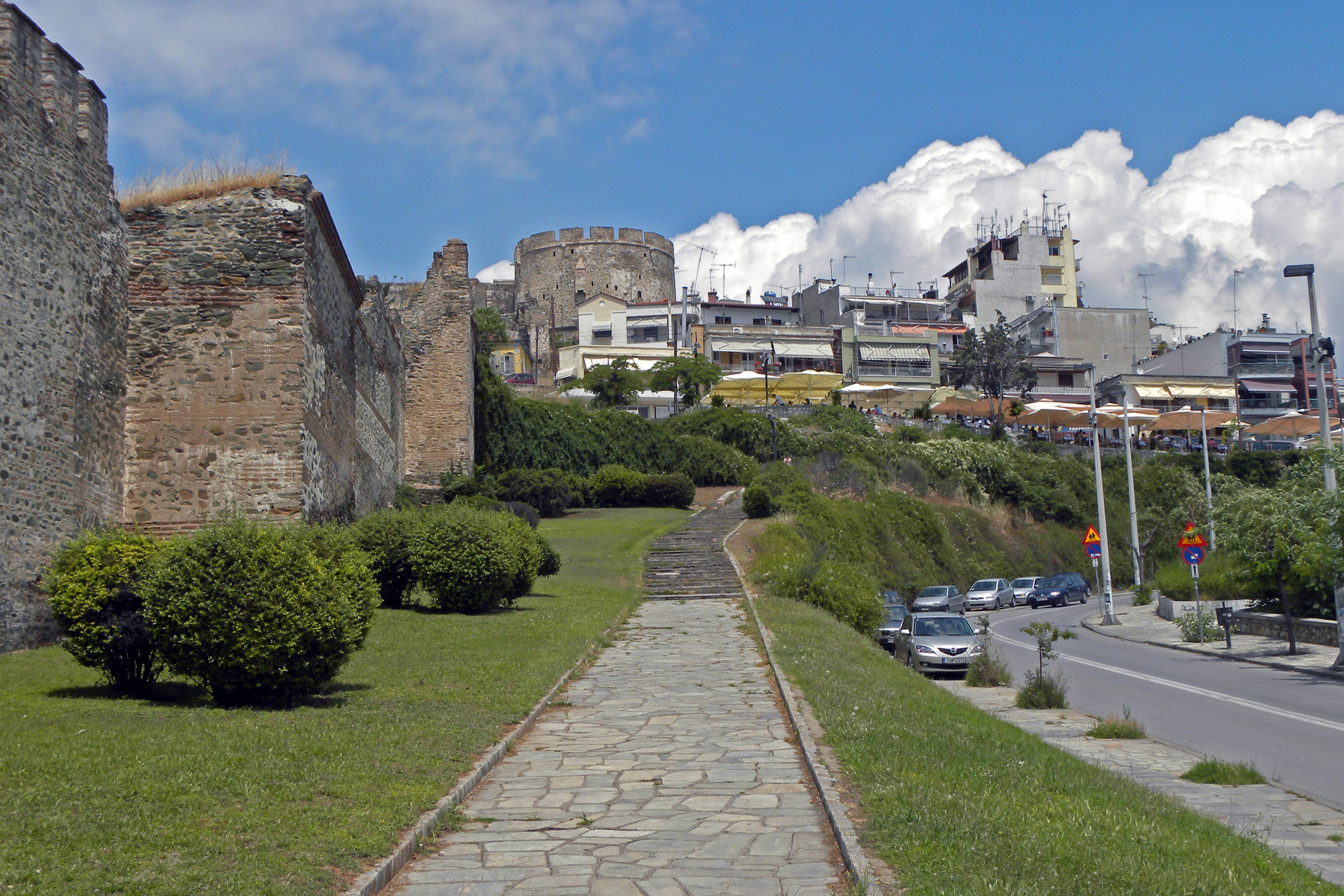
Walls in Ano Poli

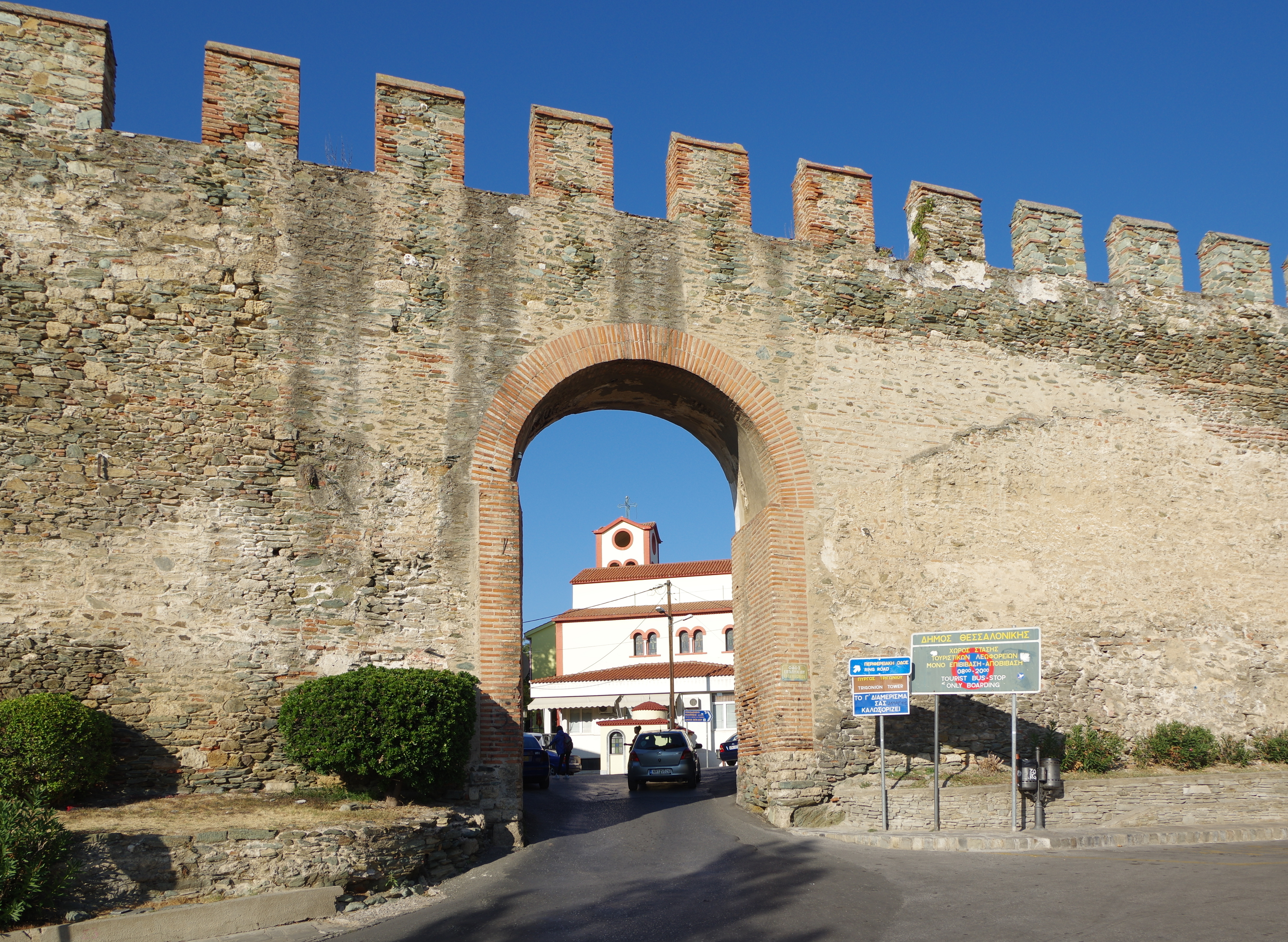
"Portara" Gate

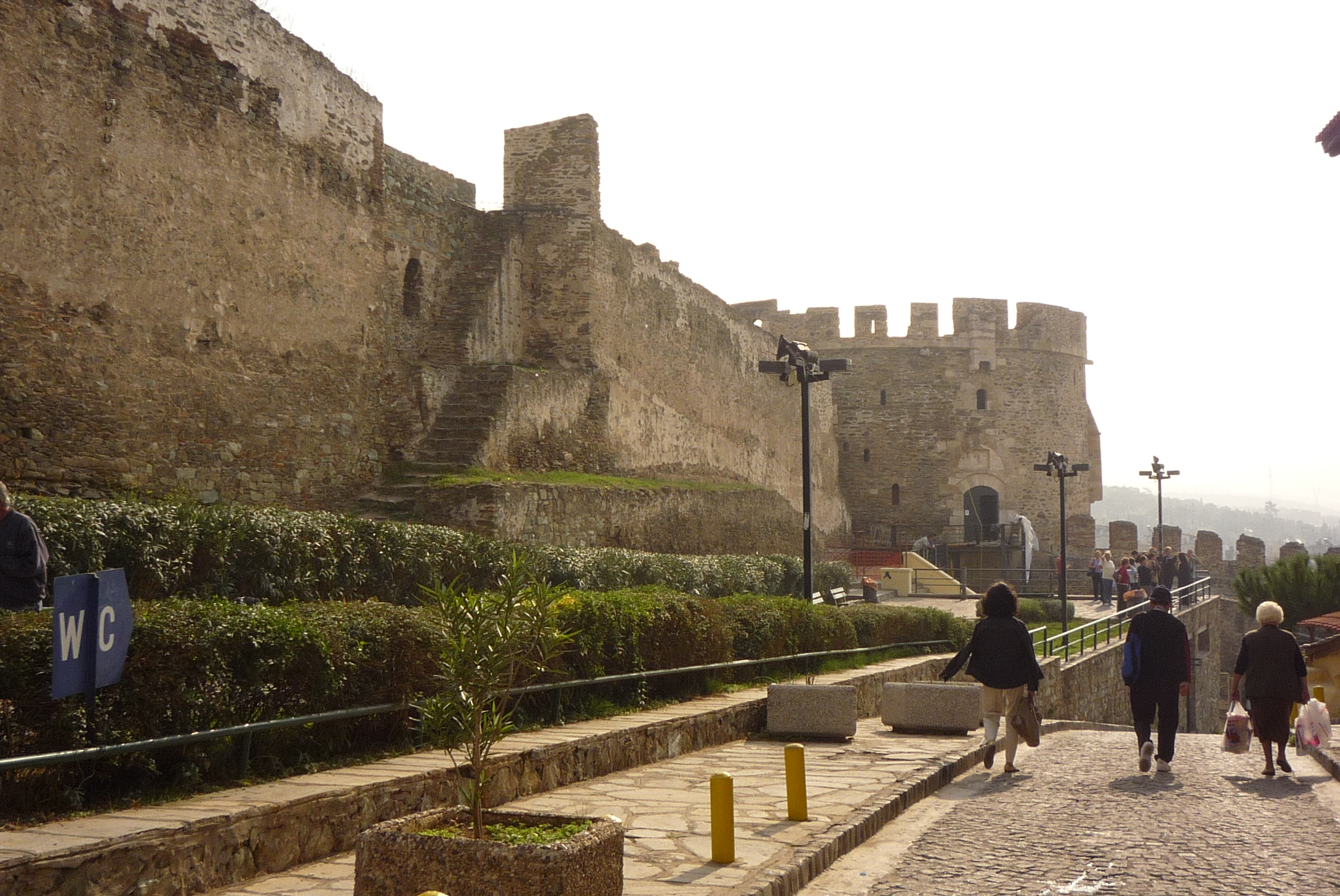
Trigonio tower (“Triangle Tower”)

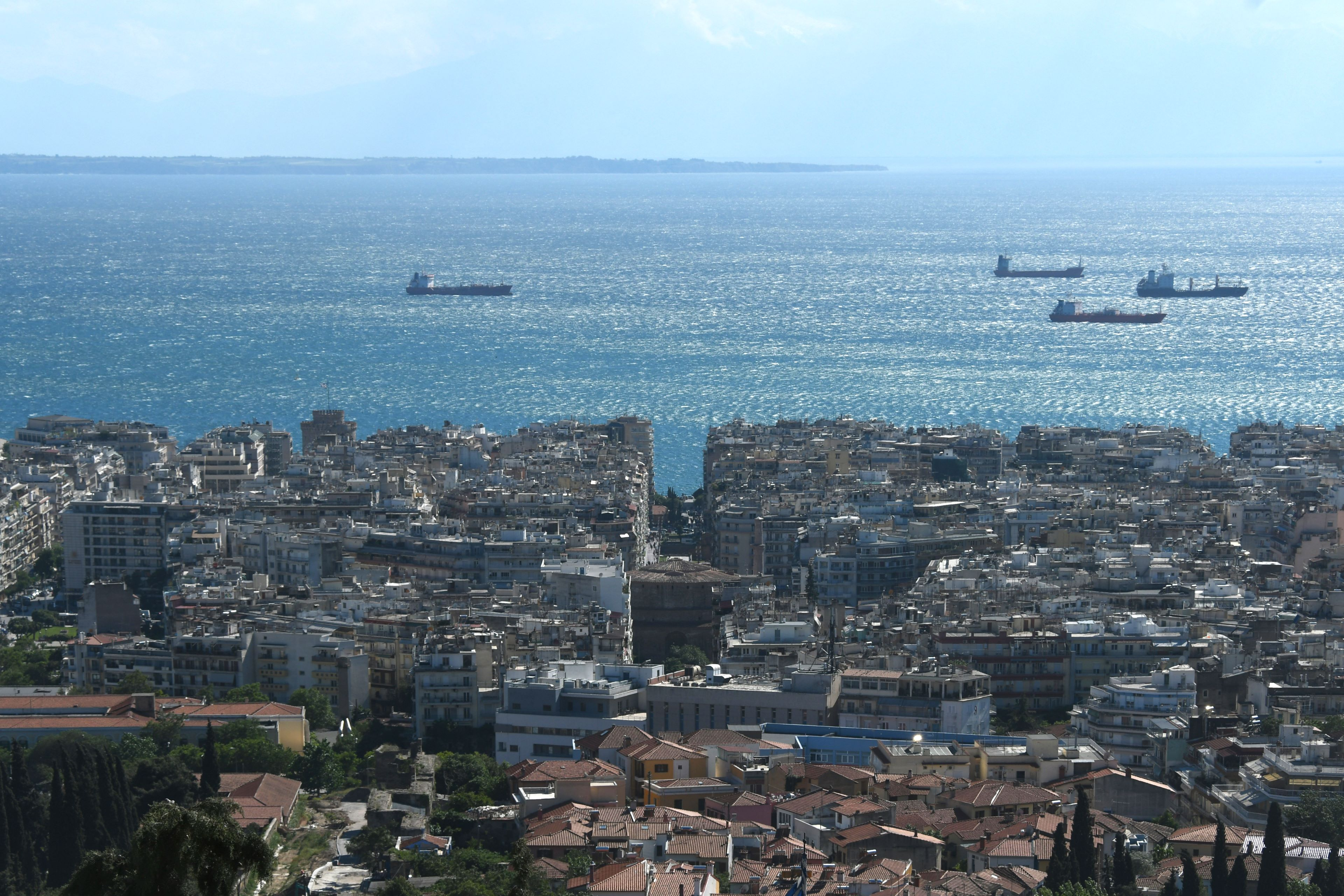
View from the Triangle tower

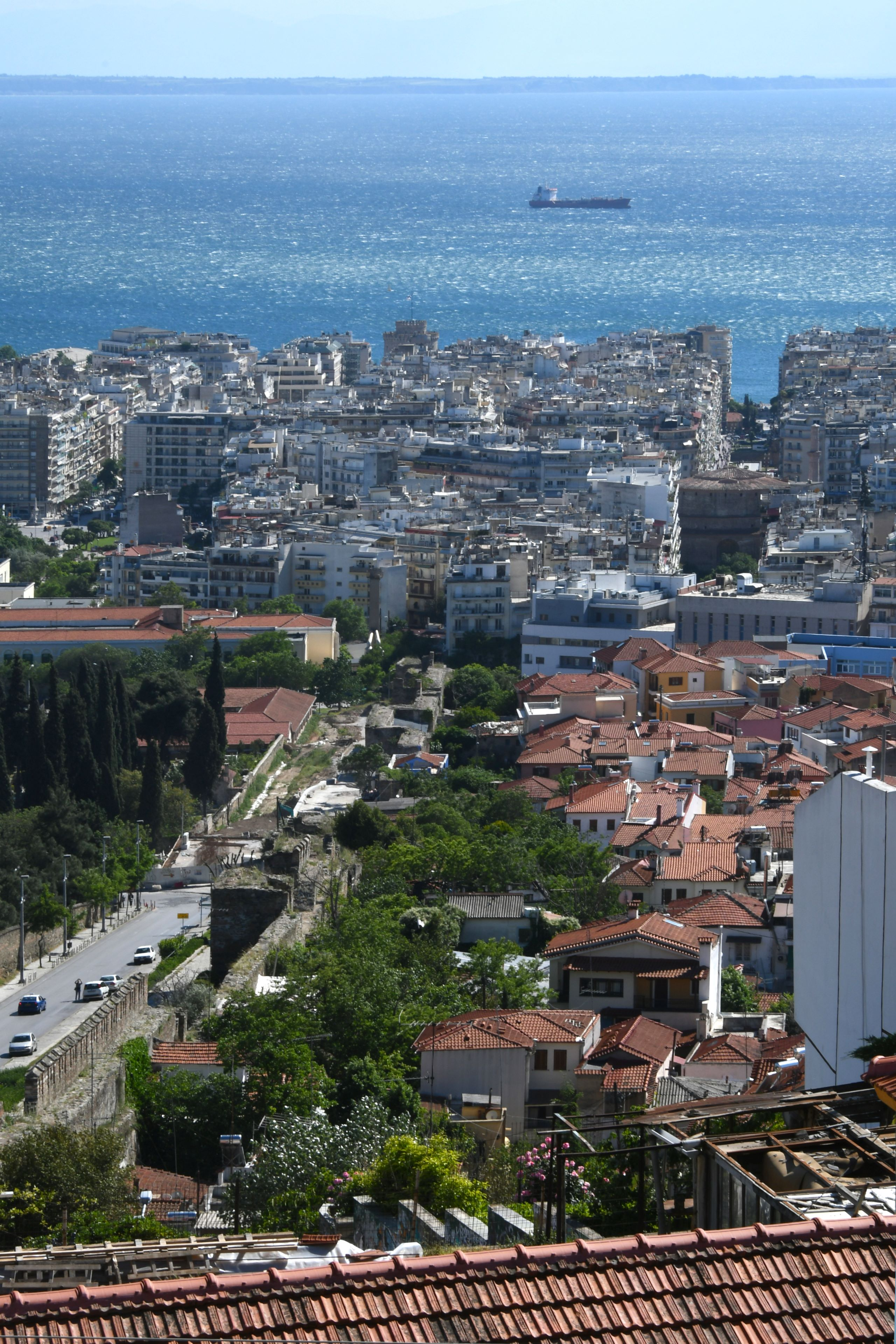
Another view

== Sources ==
- Kourkoutidou-Nikolaidou, E.; Tourta, A. (1997), Wandering in Byzantine Thessaloniki, Kapon Editions, pp. 15–26, ISBN 960-7254-47-3
