= Pammegistoi Taxiarches Church =

Byzantine church in Thessaloniki, Greece

- Παμμέγιστοι Ταξιάρχες
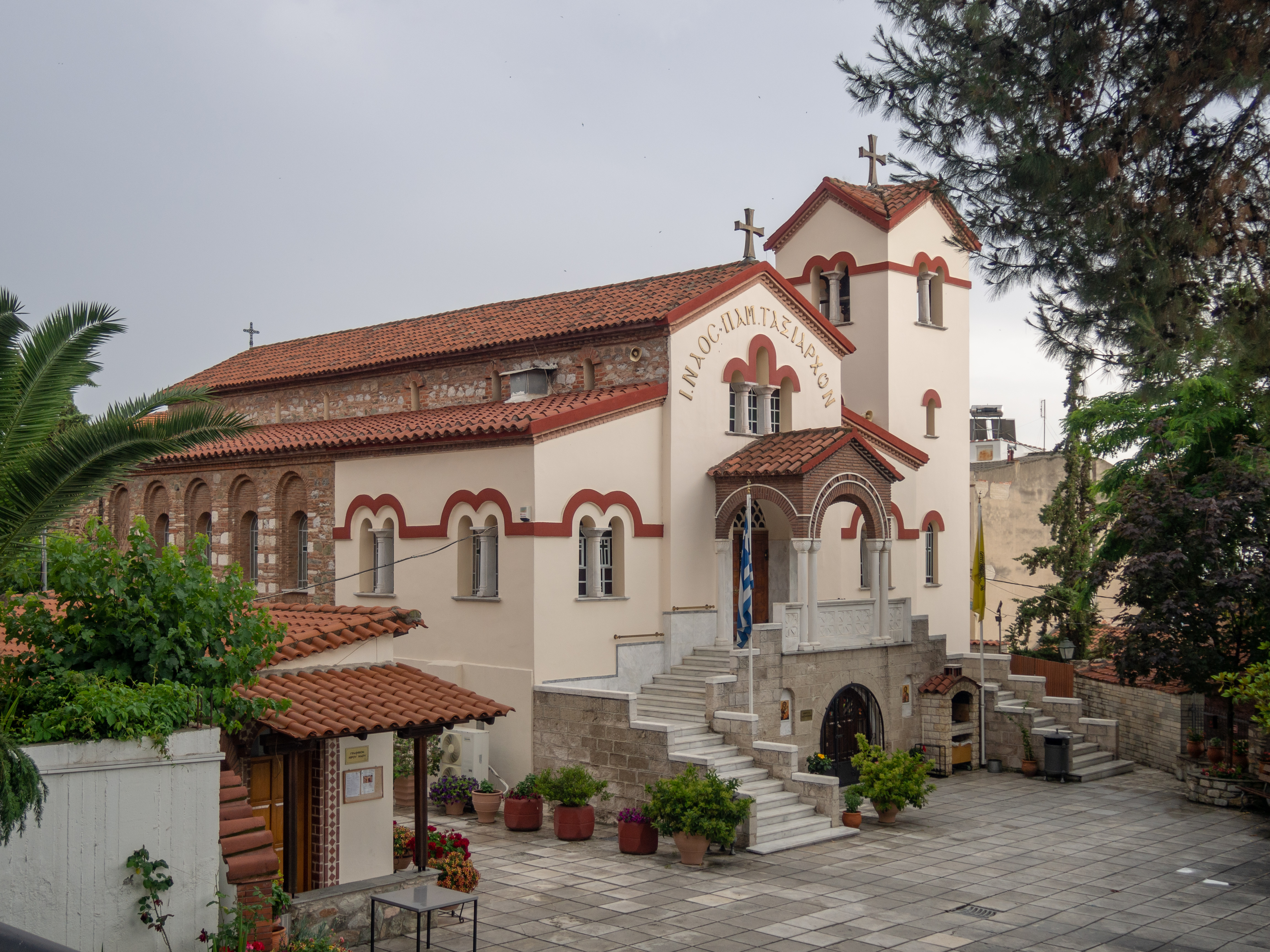
- The church in 2019

- Location of the church in Greece
- Pammegistoi Taxiarches Church
- 40°38′23″N 22°57′17″E
- Location: Thessaloniki
- Country: Greece
- Language: Greek
- Denomination: Greek Orthodox
- Previous denomination: Islam (c. 1430s–1912)

History
- Former name: Turkish: İki Şerefiye Camii (as a mosque)
- Status: Church (14th century–1430); Mosque (c. 1430s–1912); Church (since 1916– )

Architecture
- Architect: Iraklis Leontidis (1950s)
- Architectural type: Basilica
- Style: Byzantine (original); Neo-Byzantine (1950s)
- Completed: 14th century (original); 1958 (renovations)

Specifications
- Materials: Brick; stone; wood

Administration
- Metropolis: Thessaloniki

The Pammegistoi Taxiarches Church (Greek: Ιερός Ναός Παμμεγίστων Ταξιαρχών, lit. 'Holy Church of the All-Great Taxiarchs') is a Greek Orthodox church located in the Upper Town of Thessaloniki, Greece. The church was built in the 14th century during the Byzantine era, and served as a mosque during the Ottoman era, before it was reconsecrated as a church in 1916. The church underwent significant modifications during the 1950s and the 1960s, and unlike other Byzantine-style churches in Thessaloniki, a new section was added in the Neo-Byzantine style.

== History ==
The construction of the church is usually dated to the early fourteenth century. During the Ottoman rule of Thessaloniki, it was converted into a mosque, but it is not clear when. Some of the church's windows were sealed so a mihrab could be built, access to the north aisle was prohibited, changes were made to the openings in the chancel and deaconry arches and part of the part of the north wall was reconstructed with Islamic-style windows. An extension was added in the south side, which was supported by wooden columns due to ground slope, and a narthex was built on the western side. A two-balcony minaret was built on the southwest side. It became known as İki Şerefiye Camii, meaning "mosque of the two balconies", after its two-balcony minaret.

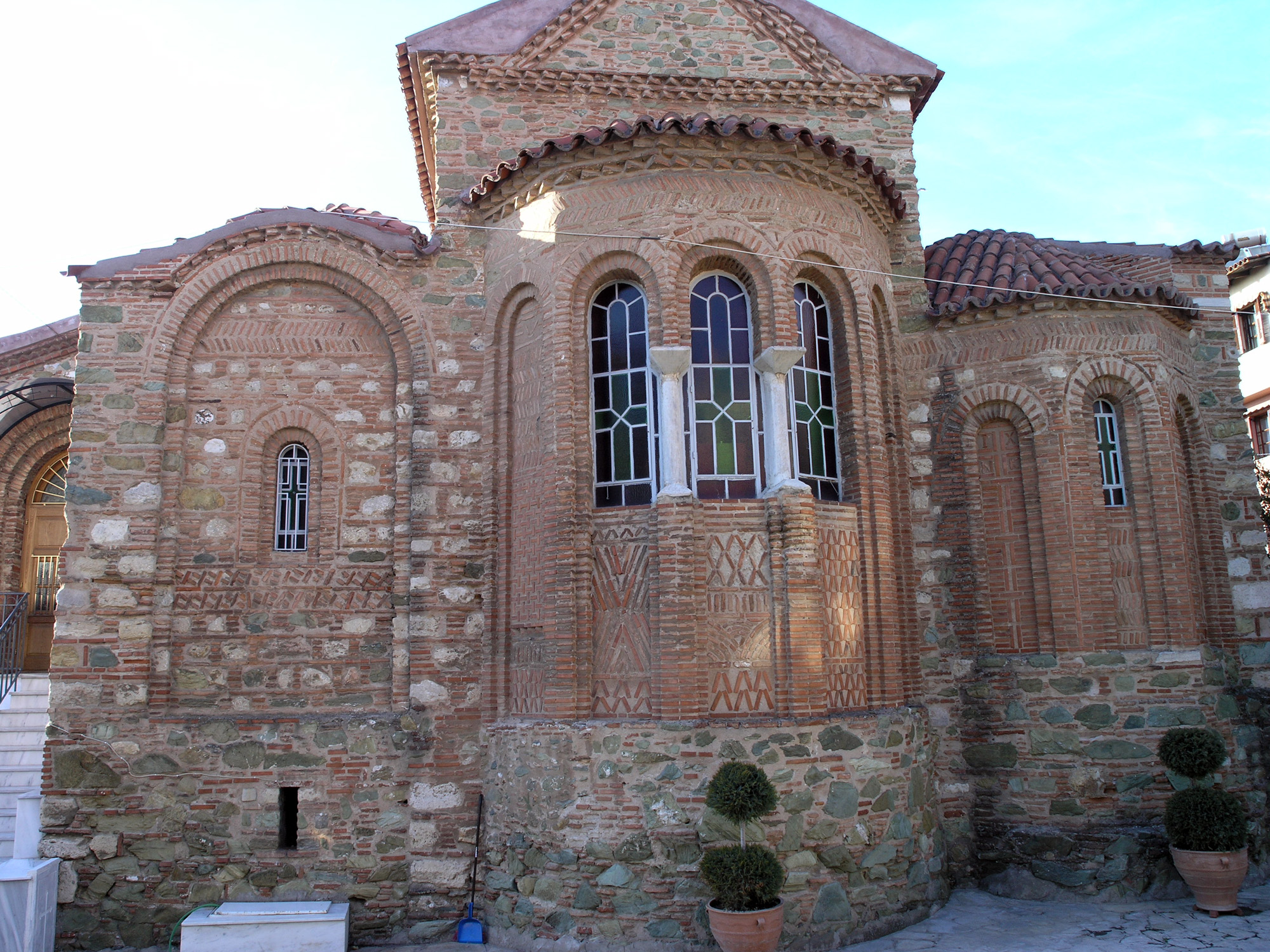
The church's eastern wall

The church was restored to Christian worship after 1912 upon the liberation of Thessaloniki in the Balkan Wars, and from 1914 until 1916 it housed several Greek refugees from Thrace, and as a result it suffered some damage. In order for it to be used as a Christian church, several modifications were completed in order for the room to be conjoined and better lit. The western wall of the central and northern aisle was torn down, making the northern aisle a section of the portico, which thus became Π-shaped, as opposed to its previous Γ shape. The minaret was torn down and the mihrab was removed. The western part of the portico was sealed with glass panes and new roof tiles were installed, brought from Villa Allatini. The precinct and the propylon of the church were re-built in 1939.

Pammegistoi Taxiarches received its final and current shape during the 1950s. The church priests wanted the church to be extended for some years, due to the rising population growth of the Upper Town. Architect Iraklis Leontidis designed plans in the Neo-Byzantine style that were approved by the ministry on 5 November 1951, and by the Directorate of Restorations and Ecclesiastical Architecture, and by Anastasios Orlandos on 12 November, subject to some modifications, and the renovations began on 20 November.

The works included the repair of the crypt, the demolition of the exonarthex and the extension of the church by 6 metres (20 ft). Due to lack of funds, many of the materials used were either sold or reused; for example, the timber from the slat for the concrete molds was pre-used. Although the church had reached the stage of roof repair by 1953, work slowed down significantly and additional funds were sought. The major works were finally completed by 1958 with the construction of the porch, the plastering of the interior and the exterior, and the tiling of the bell-tower. Work on the interior of the church continued at a slow pace. For example, the iconostasis plans were only delivered in 1969. It is not clear what sort of modifications took place in the original, Byzantine-part of the church, as they were not recorded anywhere, but can be discerned using existing photographs before the renovation.

== Description ==
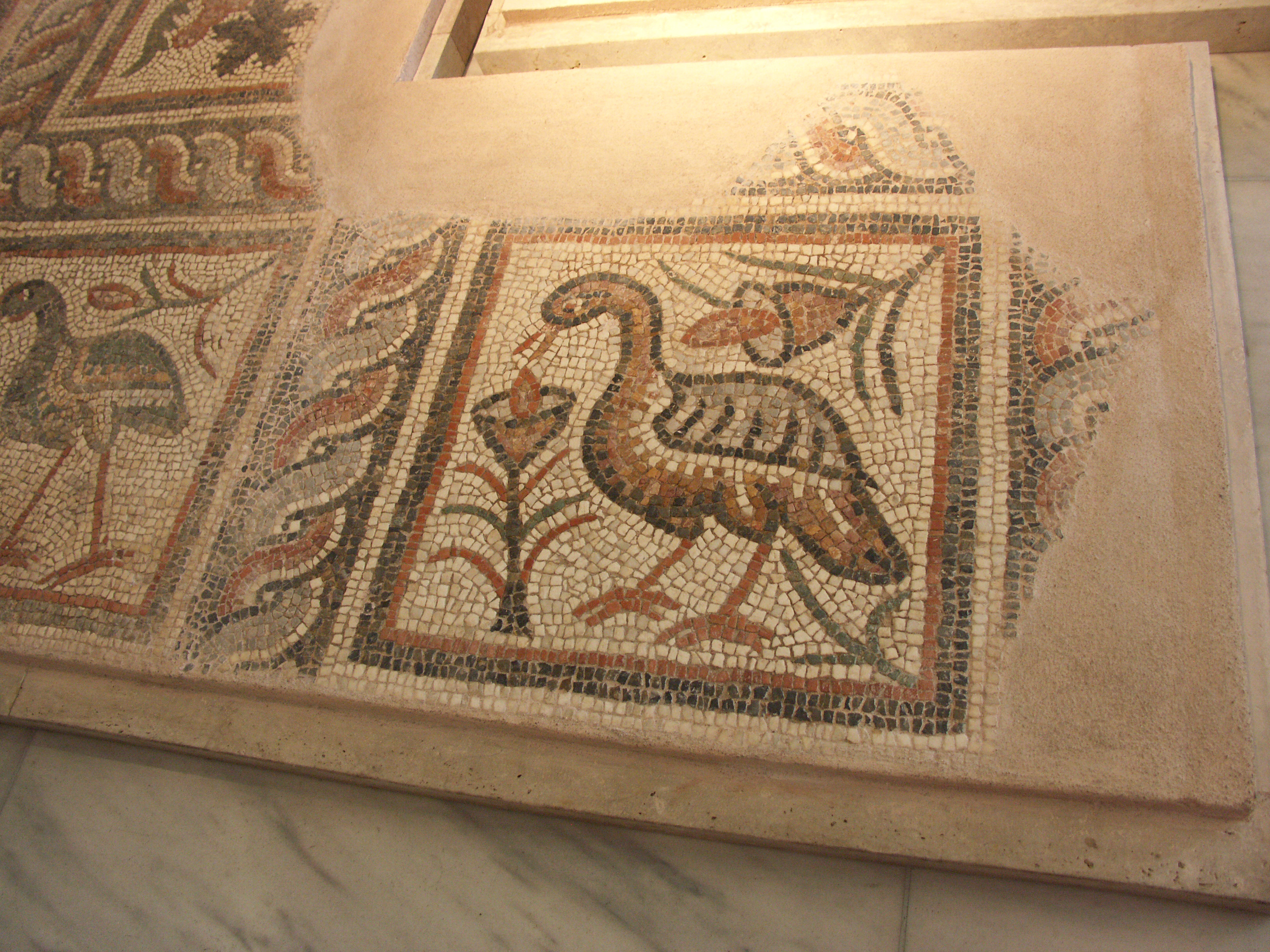
Mosaic floor of the church, since preserved

The church is a four-aisled basilica, 19.7 metres (65 ft) tall and 15.1 metres (50 ft) wide, without counting the arch of the sanctuary. Three of the aisles of the church are separated by two pairs of columns in their eastern part and two pairs of columns in the western part, while the fourth, the southernmost, is separated from the rest of the church by a colonnade consisting of three Byzantine-era columns and two newer ones. The central arch of the temple has a three-lobed window with colonnades and is pentagonal. The chancel and diaconal both have two arched windows. The chancel has a tripartite arch while the diaconal has no arch. It is now known that the north aisle used to be connected to the prostheses by a three-lobed opening, which later became a single pointed and then a semicircular one.

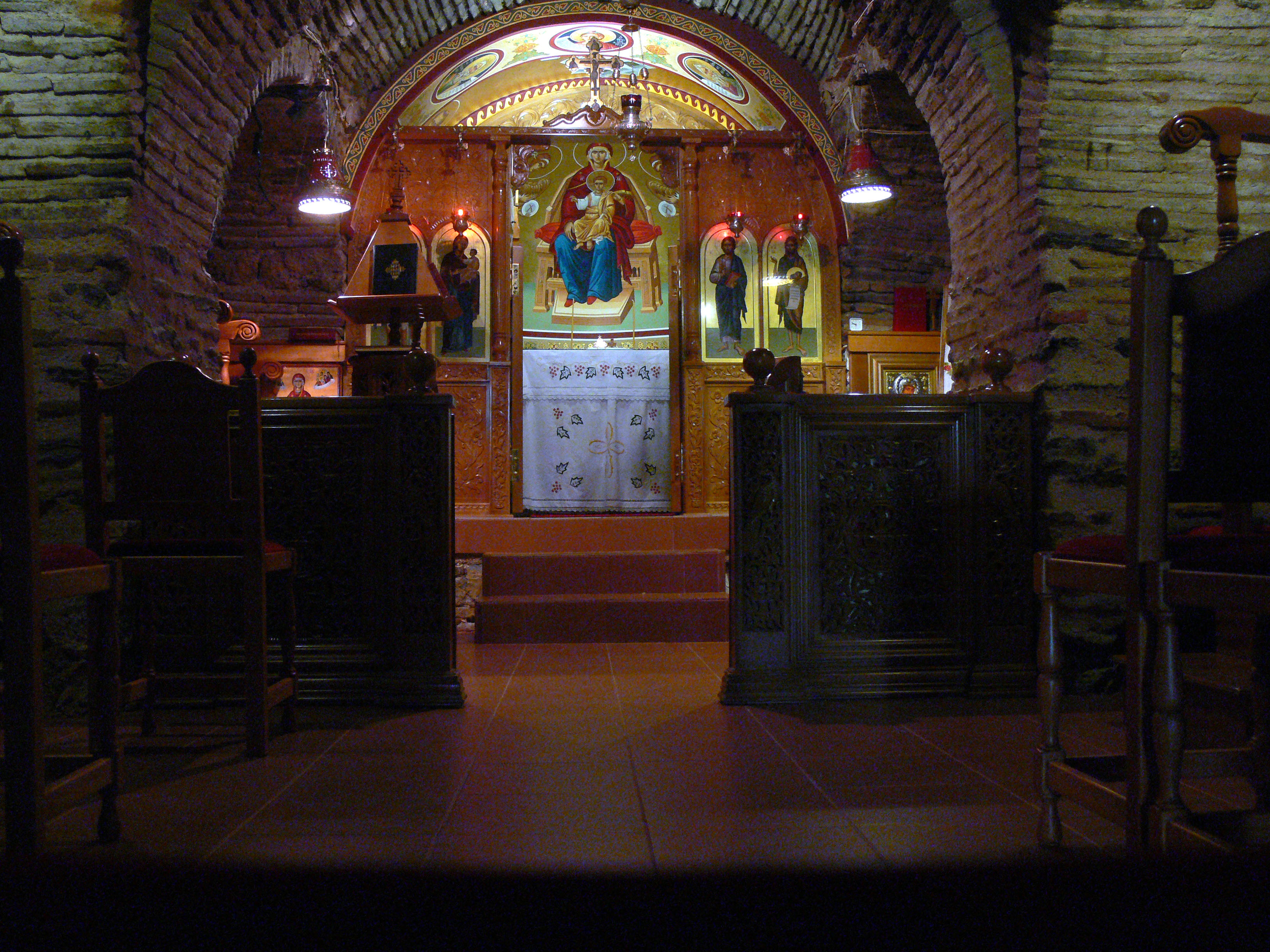
The church crypt

The entrance to the church is from the western façade. A shelter with two columns supported on the western wall of the temple covers the arched entrance. The entrance is accessed by a double staircase with two branches. The north wall has six apses, one in the plan, one blind and then to the west four double apses with an equal number of arched windows. Then on the north wall there are two newer two-bay windows. The south and west facades have also newer, bilobed windows in the Neo-Byzantine style. The church's bell-tower stands on the south-west corner of the church.

Pammegistoi Taxiarches, before the renovations that took place during the 1950s and the 1960s, consisted of a central aisle which was surrounded by a Π-shaped portico on the north, west and south. The central nave was joined to the portico through openings in the side aisles. Vaulted apartments were located in the northwest and southwest corners of the portico. The eastern and the northern walls up to the first apse and a half are thought to be dated from the Byzantine period. The rest of the northern wall was rebuilt during the 1950s.

The temple used to have many murals, but they were covered with layers of mortar for years. On the eastern pediment of the central aisle the Ascension of Christ is depicted, and on the western pediment the Pentecost, which only surfaced when the wooden ceiling, dating from the Ottoman period, was removed. Those murals have been dated from c. 1350 – c. 1375, during the Palaeologan Renaissance.

Pammegistoi Taxiarches has a semi-underground crypt. Its western and southern parts are newer and the rest is in the original Byzantine style. The entrance to the crypt is from its western side, with the use of a ladder. Like the temple above the ground, it has a central arch and chancel arch.

== Gallery ==
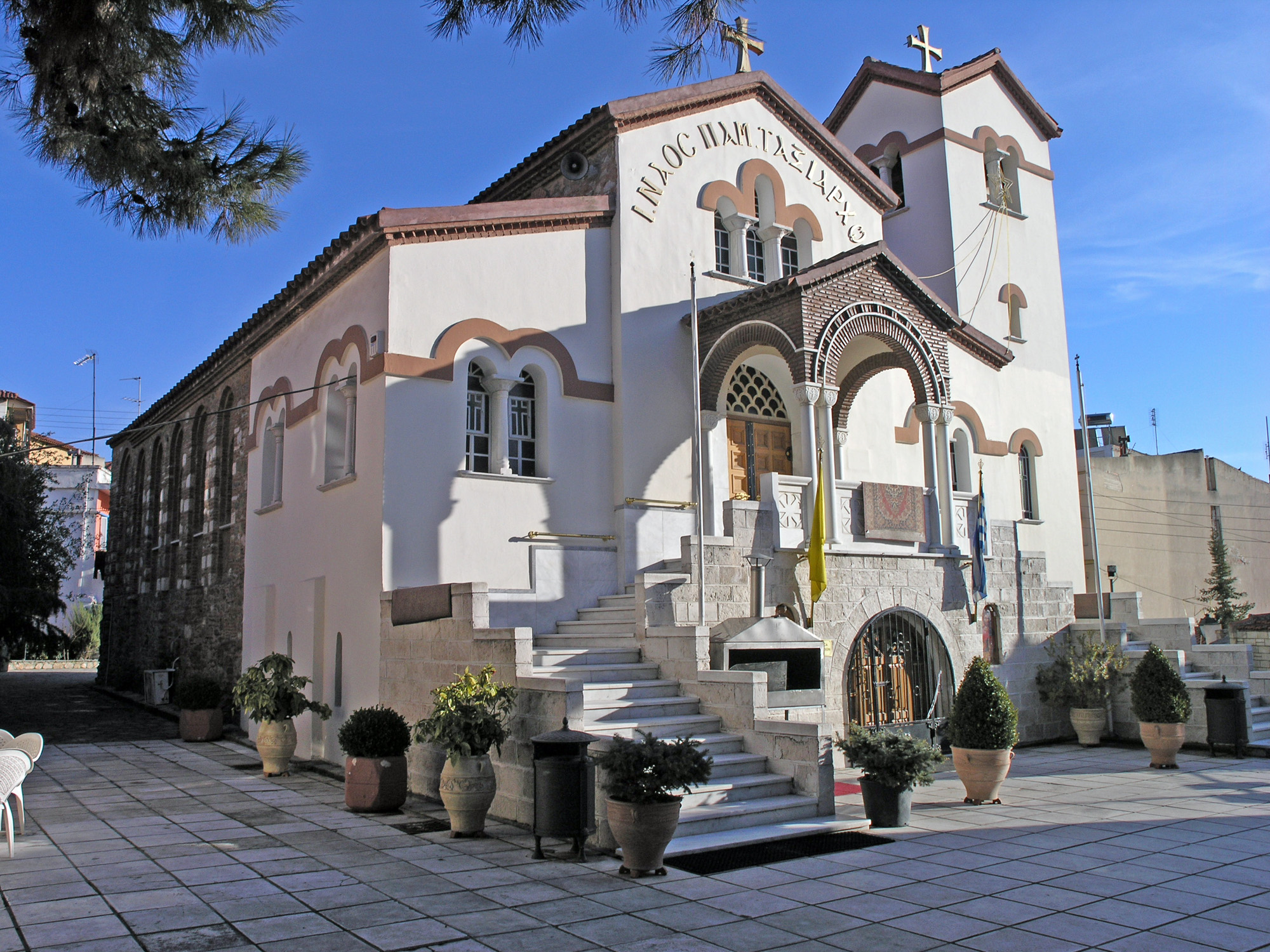
Facade

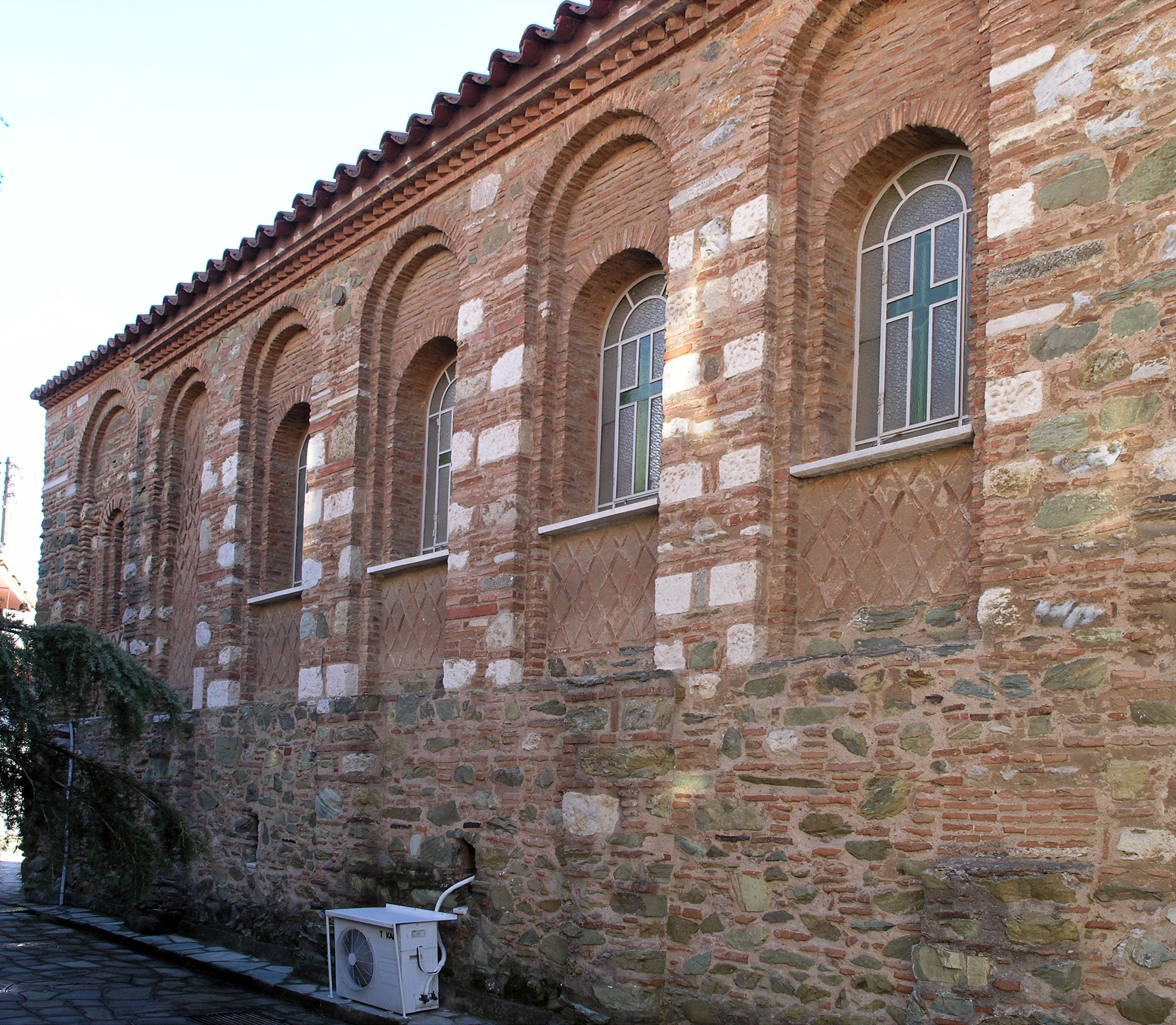
Wall

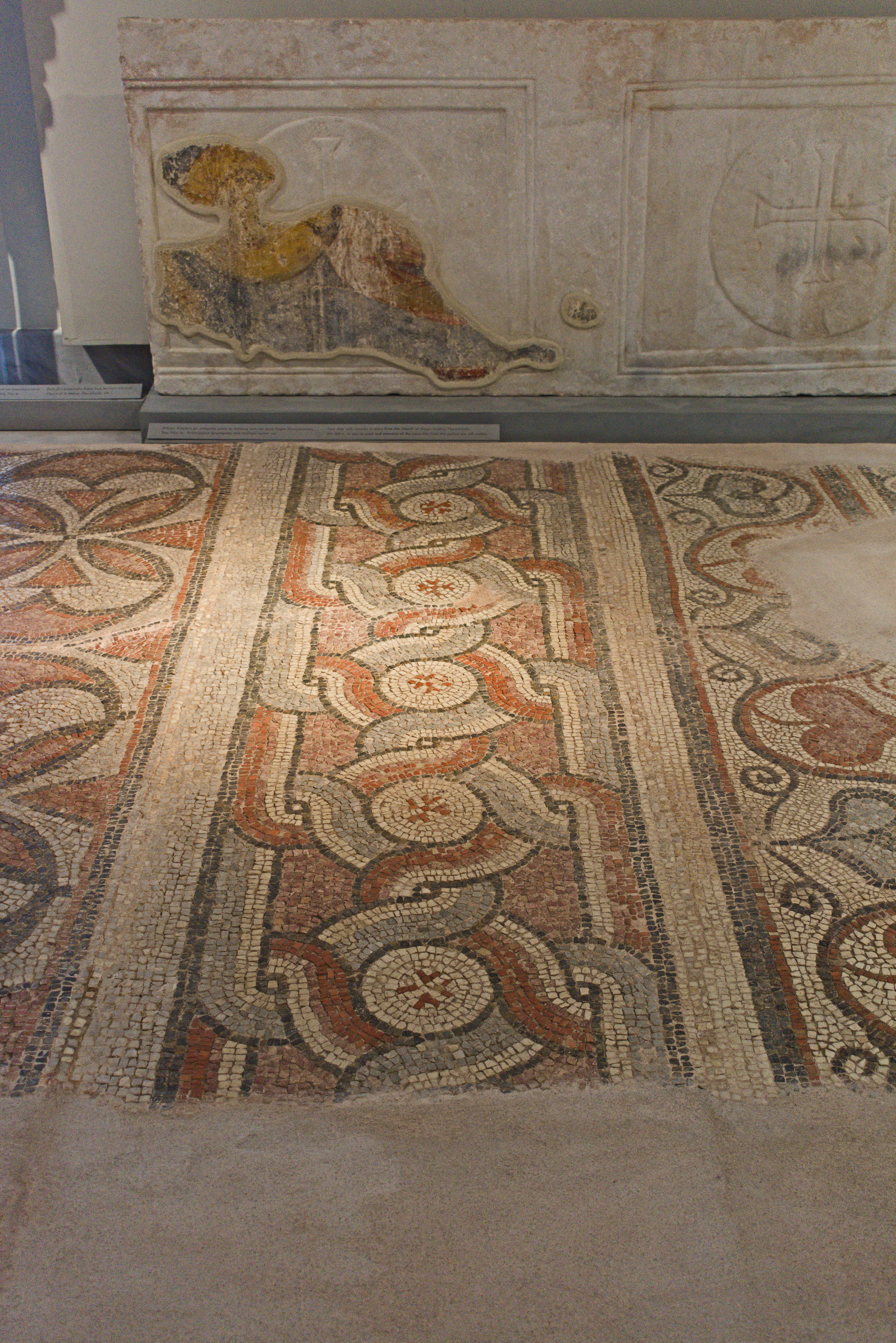
Mosaic tiled floor from the church, preserved in the Museum of Byzantine Culture

== See also ==
- Byzantine Greece
- Church of Greece
- List of former mosques in Greece
- Ottoman Greece
- Paleochristian and Byzantine monuments of Thessaloniki
  - Church of the Acheiropoietos

== Bibliography ==
- Mantopoulou-Panagiotopoulou, Thaleia (2015). Οι επεμβάσεις στο ναό των Ταξιαρχών της Θεσσαλονίκης κατά τη δεκαετία του 1950. Γ΄ Ελληνικό Συμπόσιο Νεοελληνικής Εκκλησιαστικής Τέχνης [Third Greek Symposium of Neo-Greek Ecclesiastical Art] (in Greek). National and Kaposdistrian University. pp. 773–791.
- Mantopoulou-Panagiotopoulou, Thaleia (2019). Οι μετεξελίξεις του ναού των Ταξιαρχών στην Άνω Πόλη της Θεσσαλονίκης από τη βυζαντινή στη σύγχρονη εποχή. Γ΄ Επιστημονικό Συμβούλιο «Βυζαντινή Μακεδονία» [The evolution of the church of Taxiarches in the Upper Town of Thessaloniki from the Byzantine to the modern era] (in Greek). Society for Macedonian Studies. pp. 461–486.
- Xyngopoulos, Andreas (1956). Νεώτερα ευρήματα εις τον ναόν των Ταξιαρχών Θεσσαλονίκης [Newer findings in the Taxiarches church of Thessaloniki]. Μακεδονικά (in Greek). 3: 281. doi:10.12681/makedonika.1102. ISSN 2241-2018.
