= Upper Town (Thessaloniki) =

Old town of Thessaloniki, Greece

Coordinates: 40.642°N 22.952°E

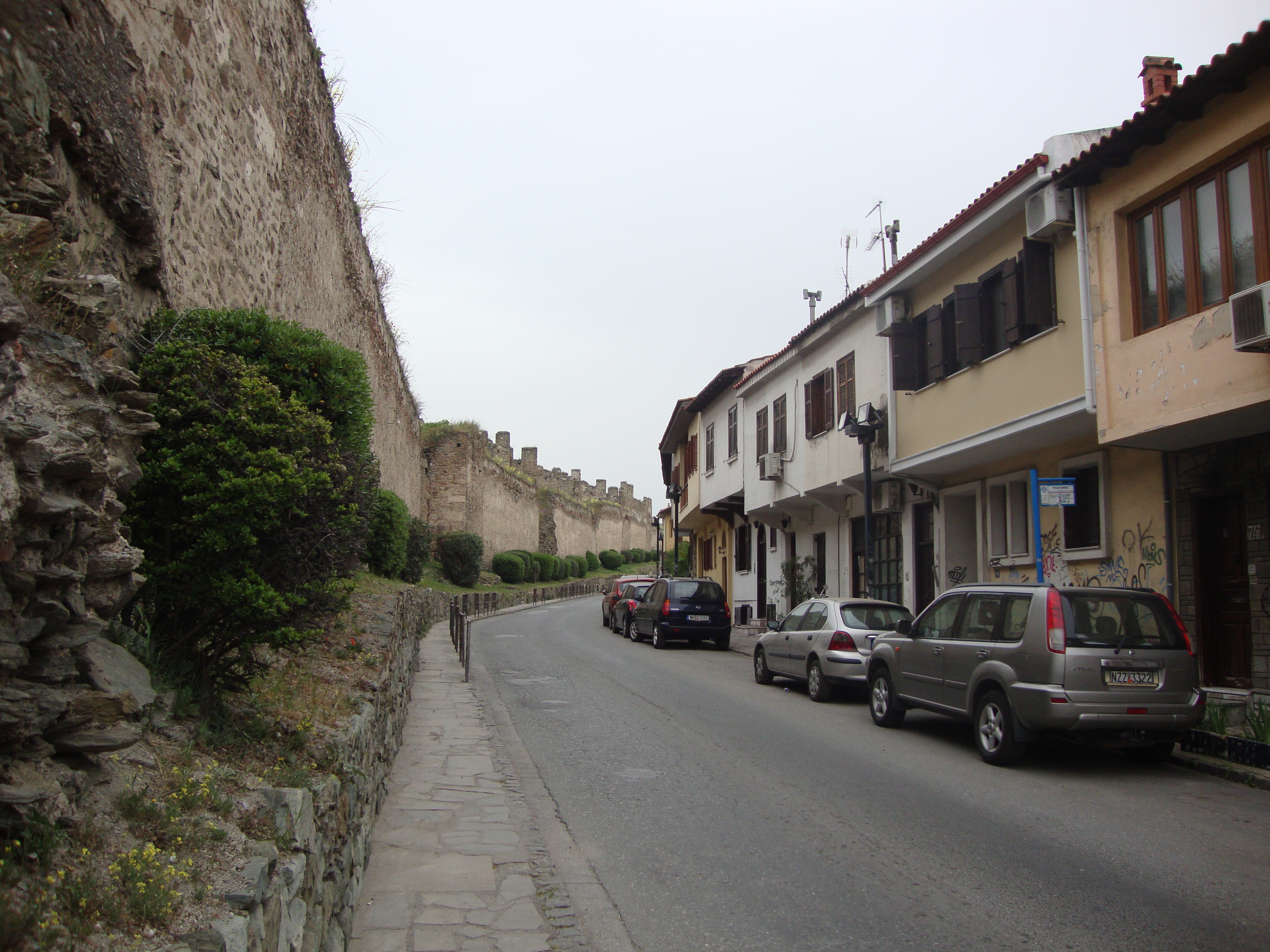
Street beside the walls

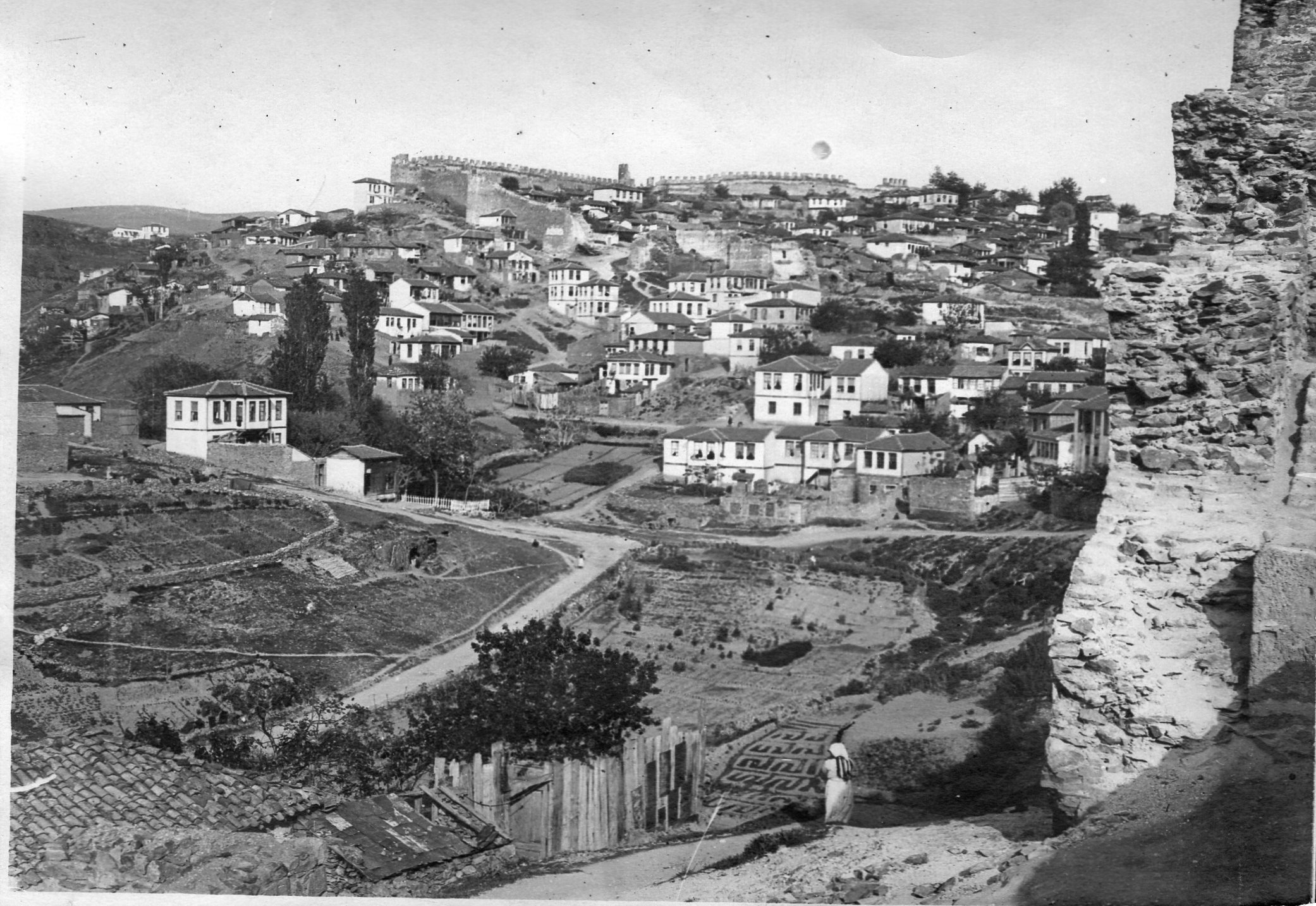
Old photo, c.1915

Upper Town or Ano Poli (Greek: Άνω Πόλη [ˈano ˈpoli]) is the old town of Thessaloniki and is located around the city's acropolis north of the city center. The neighborhood is known for its well preserved Byzantine and Ottoman era structures and urban design and as a center for Thessaloniki's poets, intellectuals, and bohemians.

Ano Poli is one of the most traditional areas in Thessaloniki. The area preserves much of the Byzantine and Ottoman era city design which was largely destroyed elsewhere in the city in the Great Fire of 1917. It is known for its small stone-paved streets, old squares, and houses in traditional Greek and Ottoman architecture. Ano Poli is the highest part of the city and is dominated by the city's acropolis, a Byzantine and Ottoman era fort known as the Eptapyrgio. What remains of the old city walls still surround Ano Poli and many Ottoman and Byzantine structures such as the Church of Prophet Elijah, the Church of St. Nicholas Orphanos, the Taxiarches church, the Byzantine bath, the Church of Saint Catherine, the Vlatades Monastery, the Atatürk Museum, and the Alaca Imaret Mosque still stand in the neighborhood. Other landmarks include the buildings of Karipio Melathro and Villa Varvara.

During the Ottoman period, Ano Poli was the main district for the Turks of the city while Greeks, western Europeans, and Jews lived below around the port.

On clear days Mount Olympus, about 80 km (50 mi) away across the gulf, can also be seen towering the horizon.

== People ==
- Dinos Christianopoulos, writer
- Iphigénie Chrysochoou, writer
- Anestis Evangelou, poet
- Nâzım Hikmet, Turkish poet
- Mustafa Kemal Atatürk, founder of the Republic of Turkey
- Kostis Moskof, writer
- Antonis Sourounis, writer
- Giorgos Themelis, writer
- Georgios Vafopoulos, writer
- Konstantinos Zervas, mayor of Thessaloniki

== Gallery ==
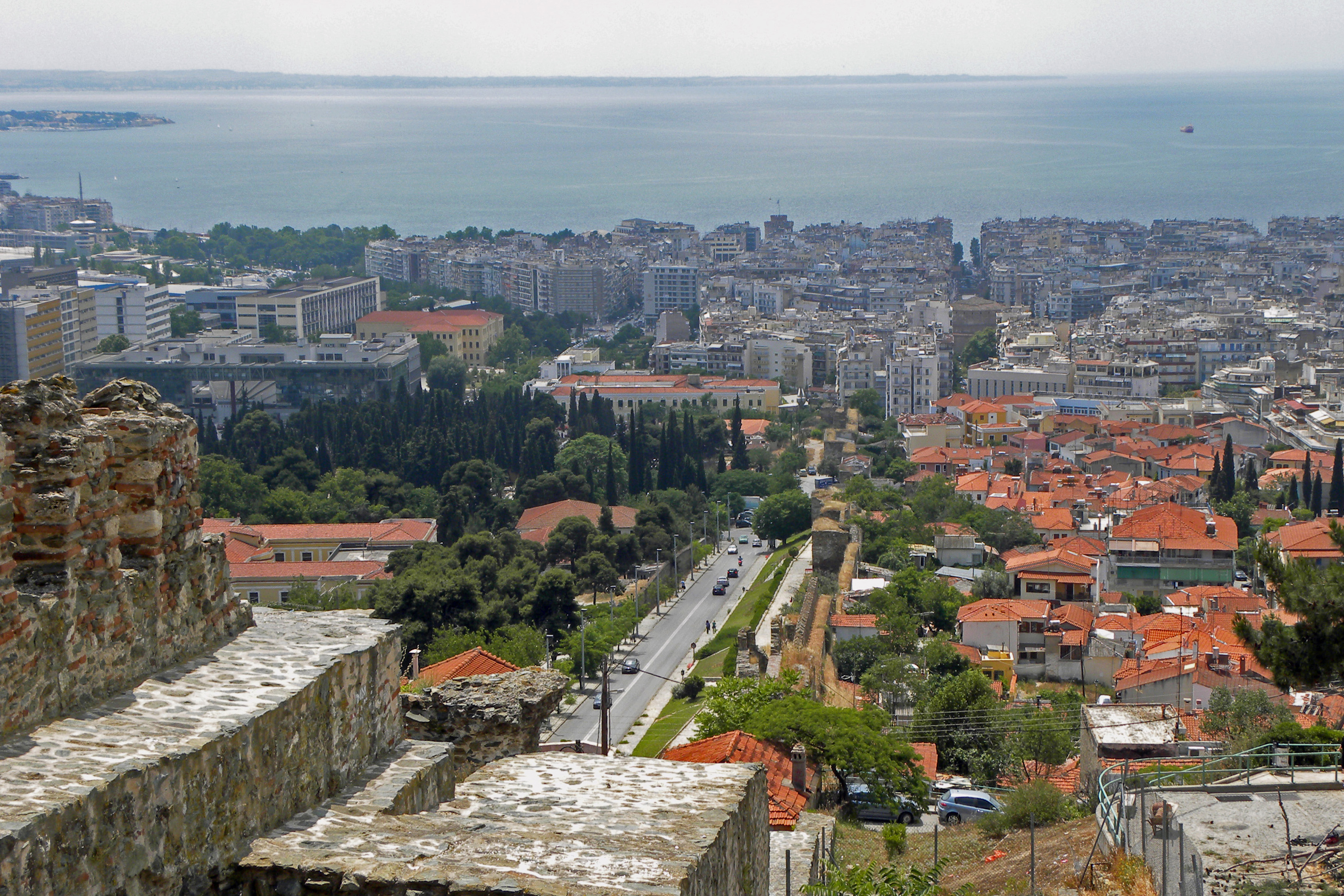
View from Ano Poli
