= Heptapyrgion =

Fortress of Thessaloniki, Greece

Coordinates: 40.644°N 22.962°E

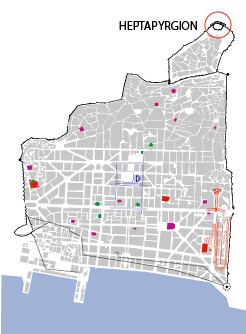
The location of the Heptapyrgion in the old city (Ano Poli) of Thessaloniki.

The Heptapyrgion (Medieval Greek: Ἑπταπύργιον [eptaˈpirʝion]), modern Eptapyrgio (Greek: Επταπύργιο [eptaˈpirʝio]), also popularly known by its Ottoman Turkish name Yedi Kule (یدی قله yedikulle; Γεντί Κουλέ), is a Byzantine and Ottoman-era fortress situated on the north-eastern corner of the Acropolis of Thessaloniki in Greece.

Despite its name, which in both languages means "Fortress of Seven Towers", it features ten, and was probably named after the Yedikule Fortress in Constantinople (modern Istanbul, Turkey). It served as the major redoubt of the city's acropolis, as well as the seat of its garrison commander in Ottoman times, until the late 19th century. It was then converted to a prison (Φυλακές Επταπυργίου), which remained open until 1989. References to the infamous Yedi Kule prison abound in the Greek rebetika songs. Restoration and archaeological work began in the 1970s and continues to this day.

== History ==
=== Construction in the Byzantine period ===
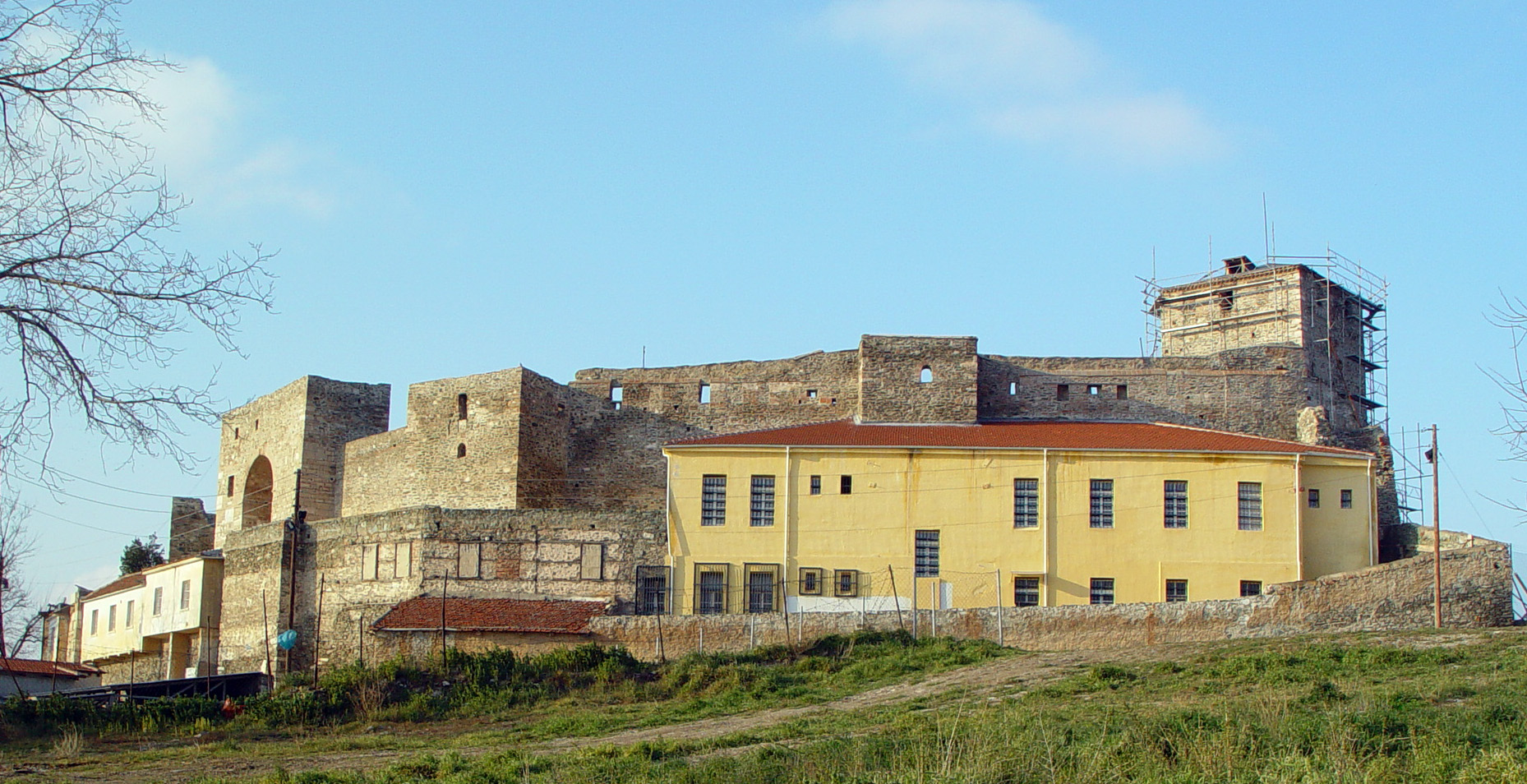
View of the Heptapyrgion from the south-east.

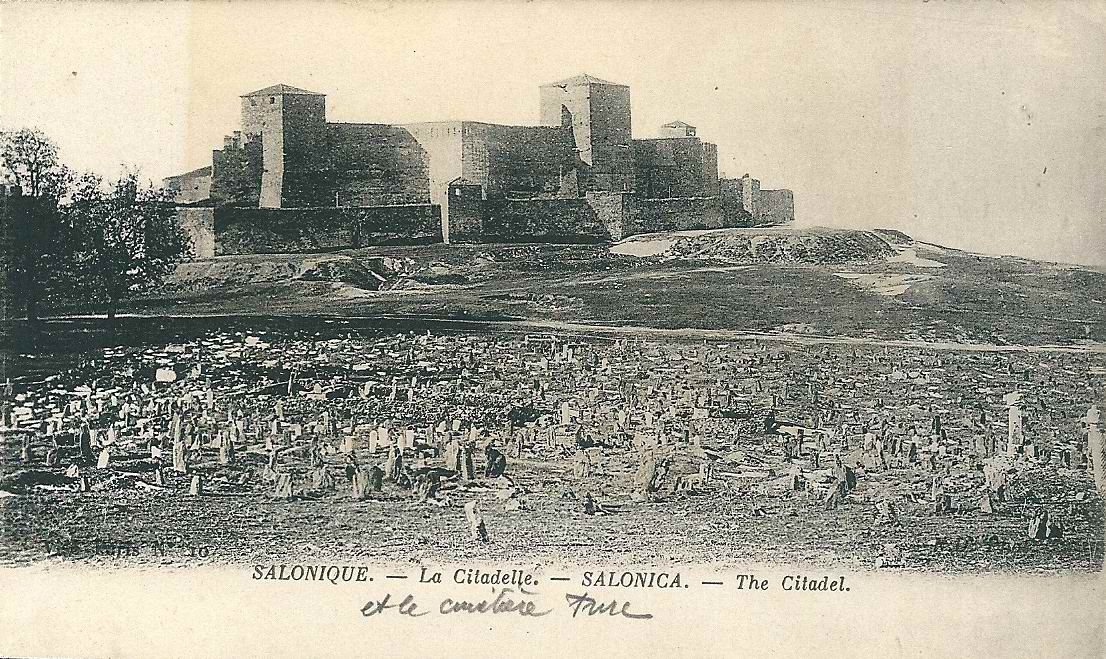
Photo c.1918

The Heptapyrgion is located in the north-eastern corner of the city's acropolis. Although the urban core of the city essentially dates from its foundation by Cassander in 316 BC, the walls that defined the medieval and early modern city, and that are still visible today, date to late Antiquity, when the Roman emperor Theodosius I (r. 379–395) fortified the city anew. The five northern towers of the Heptapyrgion, along with the curtain wall that connects them, form the northern corner of the acropolis and probably date to this period. Another theory, dating their construction to the 9th century, has also been brought forth.

The southern five towers and wall were built likely in the 12th century, thus forming a fortified redoubt in the interior of the city's citadel. This fortress was then maintained and rebuilt in the Palaiologan period. The nature of the reconstruction and dating of the southern portion of the fort is disputed. There is no reference to this fort in the older literary sources, and the later ones are often ambiguous: a kastéllion (καστέλλιον, "fortress") is mentioned in 1208–1209 and a "kastellion with the Tzakones of the castle" in 1235. The "Koulas of Thessaloniki" (κουλάς from Turkish: kule, "fort") is present in the chronicles of the 14th and 15th centuries but could refer to the entire citadel and not just the Heptapyrgion.

=== From Byzantine citadel to Ottoman fort ===
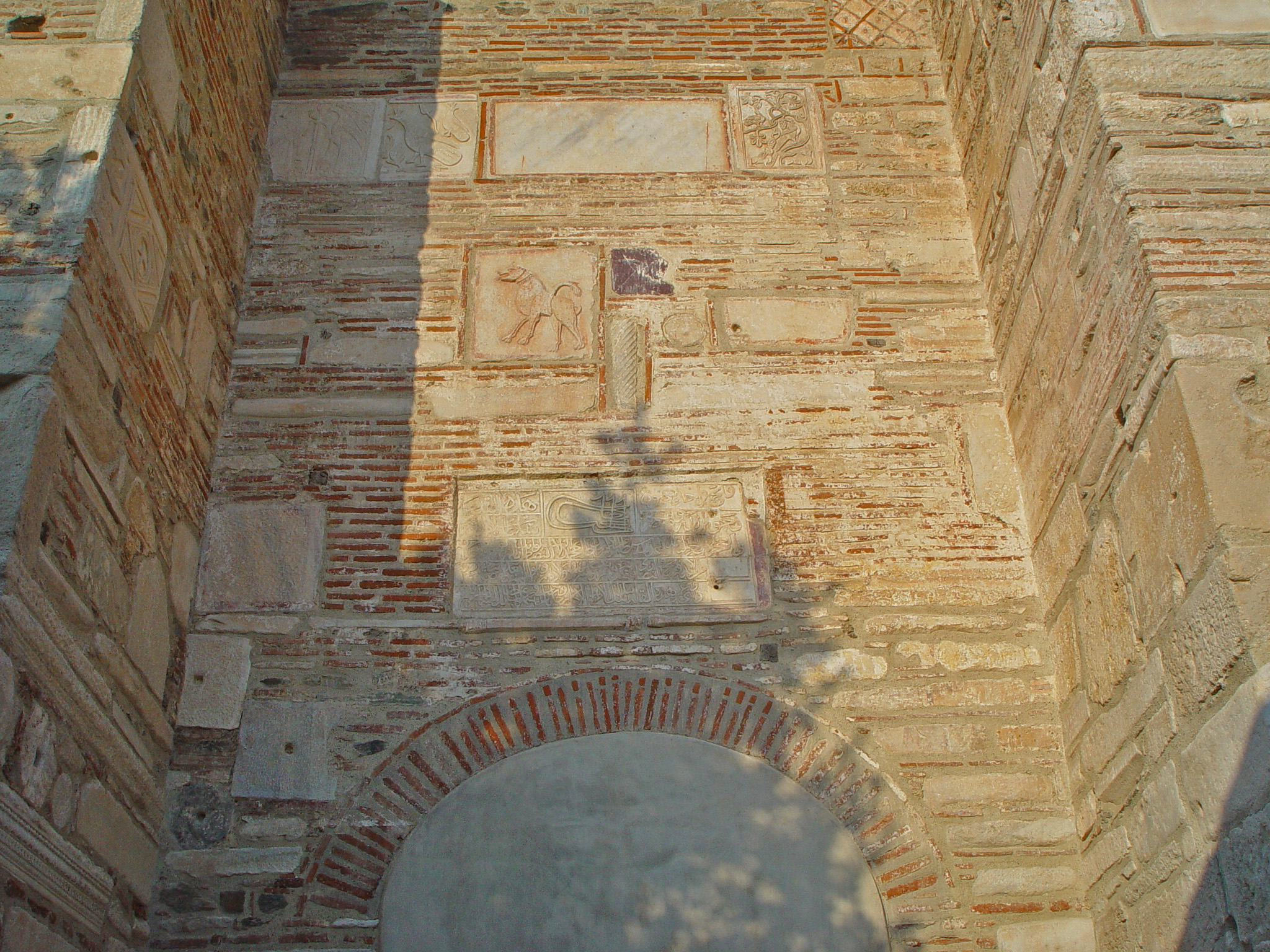
The Ottoman inscription above the gate. Various architectural spolia, embedded into the masonry as decorative elements, are also evident. Note the tughra on the inscription.

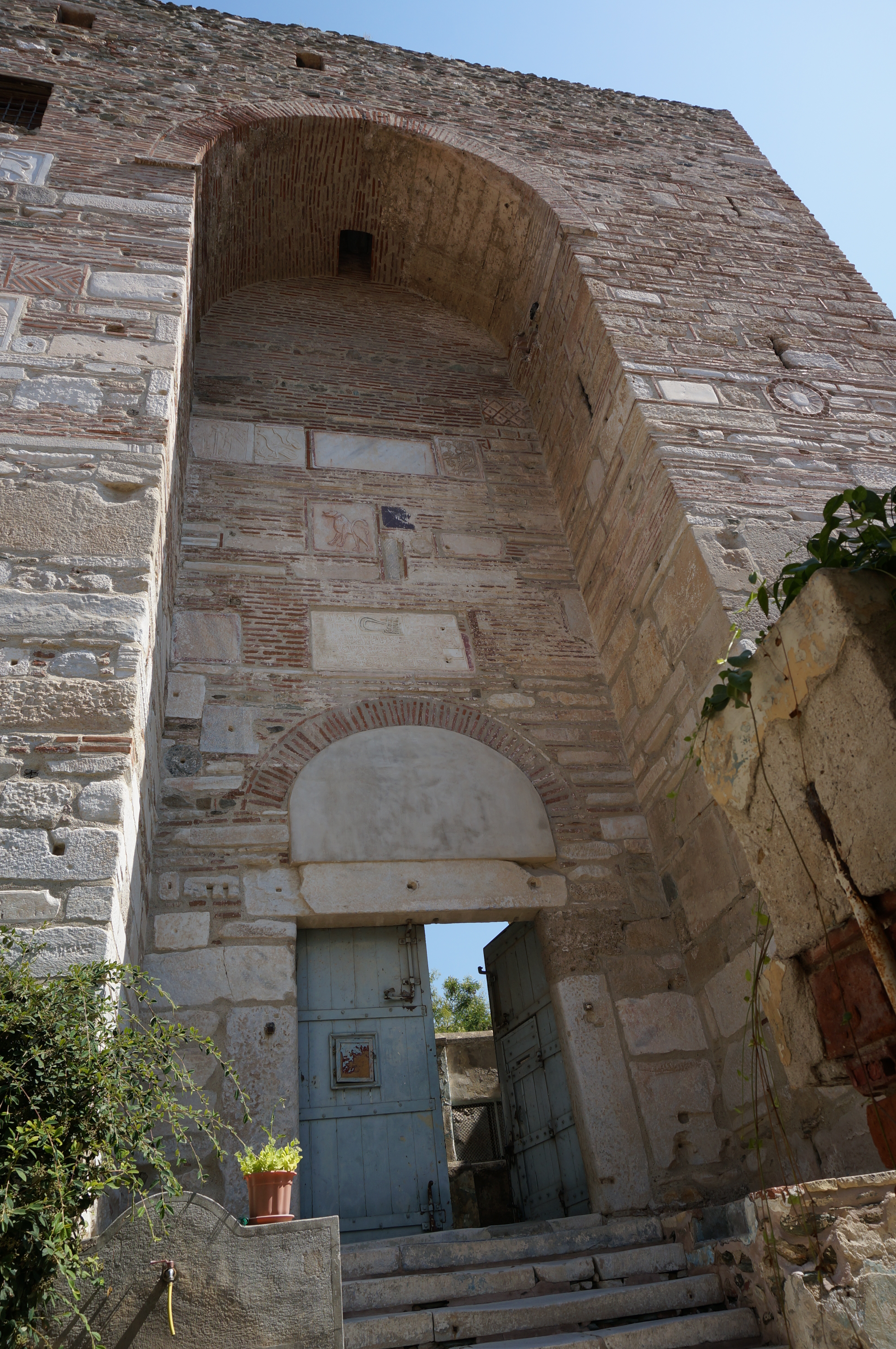
Entrance

The principal reliable testimony regarding the fortress is the inscription placed over its gate, which indicates that it was rebuilt by Çavuş Bey, the city's first Ottoman governor, in 1431, immediately after the Ottoman conquest of the city:

This acropolis was conquered and captured by force, from the hands of the infidels and the Franks, with the aid of God, by the Sultan Murad, son of Sultan Mehmed, whom God never ceases to give the banner of victory. And about a month later, this tower was rebuilt and founded by Çavuş Bey, king of the emirs and the Great, in the month of Ramadan, the year 834 (1431 AD).

Rather than a new construction, which has been disproved by archaeology, the work of Çavuş Bey may have been limited to the restoration of the bastions over the fort's monumental entrance. In a 1591 account, the fort, referred to as the Iç Kale ("Inner Castle"), serves as the residence of the city's military governor and has a 300-strong garrison. Another inscription, lost today but known from the writings of the 17th-century Ottoman traveller Evliya Çelebi, testified to another restoration in 1646.

An inventory of the arms and munitions contained in the various forts of the city in 1733 provides the Turkish names for the ten towers: Fener Kulesi (Lamp Tower), Makaslı Kule (Bent Tower), Su Kulesi (Water Tower), Cephane Kulesi (Ammunition Tower), Hapishane Kulesi (Prison Tower), Kız Kulesi (Maiden Tower), Zahire Ambar Kulesi (Granary Tower), Hisar Peçe (Barbican), Kanlı Burgaz (Bloody Tower), and the Çingene Tabyalar (Fortifications of the Gypsies). The latter three were considered as individual forts, unlike the others, which are classified as simple towers.

In the late 19th century, the fortress fell out of use as a military installation and was converted into a prison.

=== As a prison ===
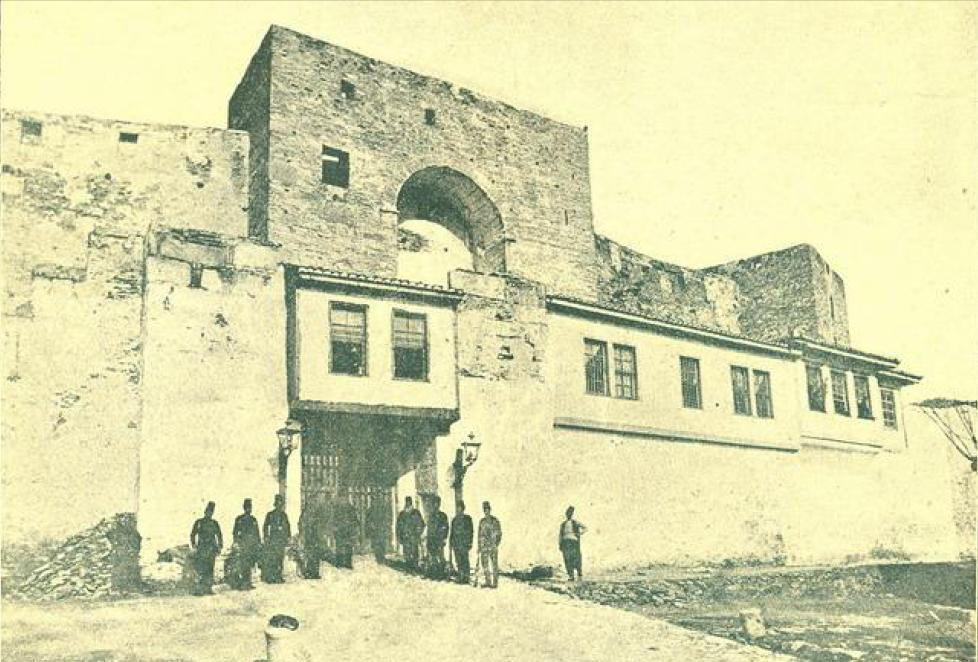
Main gates of the Yedi Kule with Ottoman soldiers in front

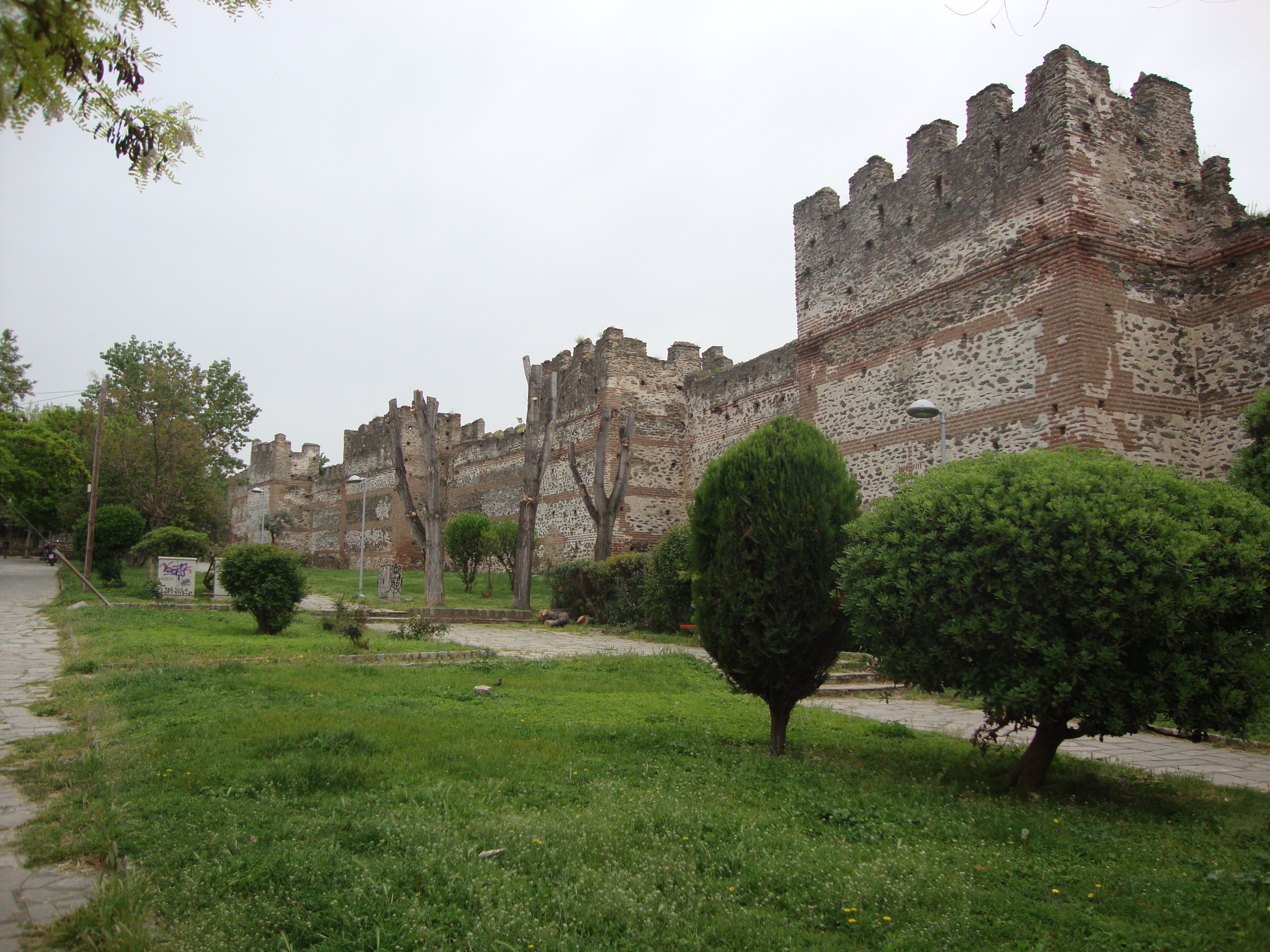
Walls of Eptapyrgio

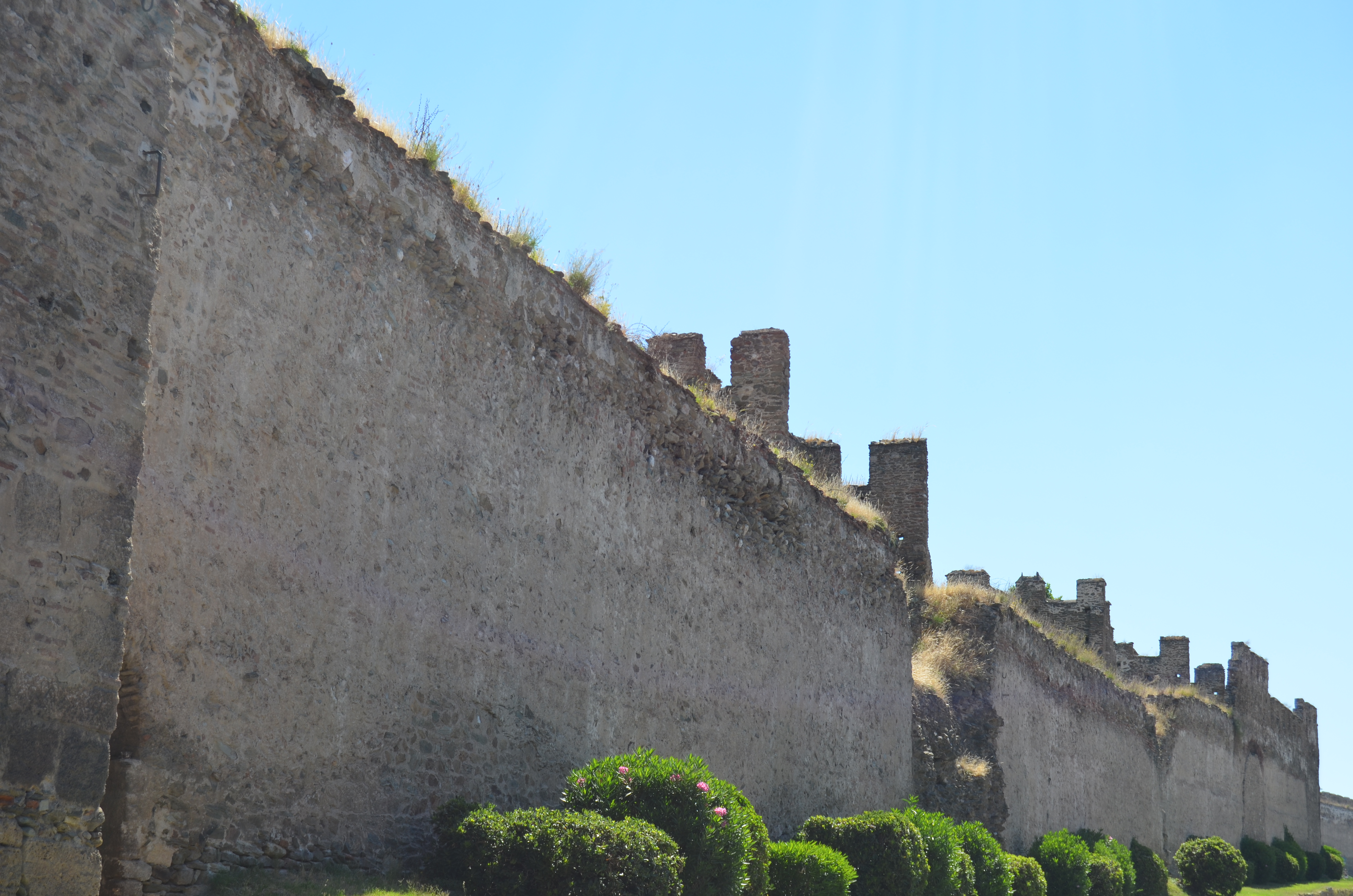
Walls

During the 1890s, the fortress was converted into a prison. The exact date is not known with certainty, but the prison is mentioned in an 1899 map of the city, thus providing a terminus ante quem for the change. This conversion entailed the removal of all previous buildings in the fort's interior, of which no trace now survives. The fortifications themselves were only little modified, although their role was effectively reversed: designed to protect its residents from outside dangers, they now served to isolate the inmates from the outside world.

The prison was for long the main penitentiary facility of the city and housed all convicted, regardless of sex or crime. New buildings were built along both sides of the walls to fulfill the various needs of the fort's new role. The interior courtyard was partitioned into five separate enclosures by fences radiating from a central watchtower. Three featured a two-story building housing the cells and a guard post, while the other two held the prison chapel and other annexes. A fourth cell block was situated close to the north-eastern tower, and was destroyed during the Second World War. The exterior buildings, on the fort's southern side, housed the administration, the women's prison and, to the west, the isolation cells.

The prison is well known through its frequent occurrence in the underground rebetiko music. Many songs feature its colloquial name,Yedi Kule. Ιt also acquired notoriety through its use to house political prisoners during the Metaxas Regime, the Axis Occupation of Greece, and in the post-war period from the Greek Civil War up to the Regime of the Colonels.

=== Restoration ===
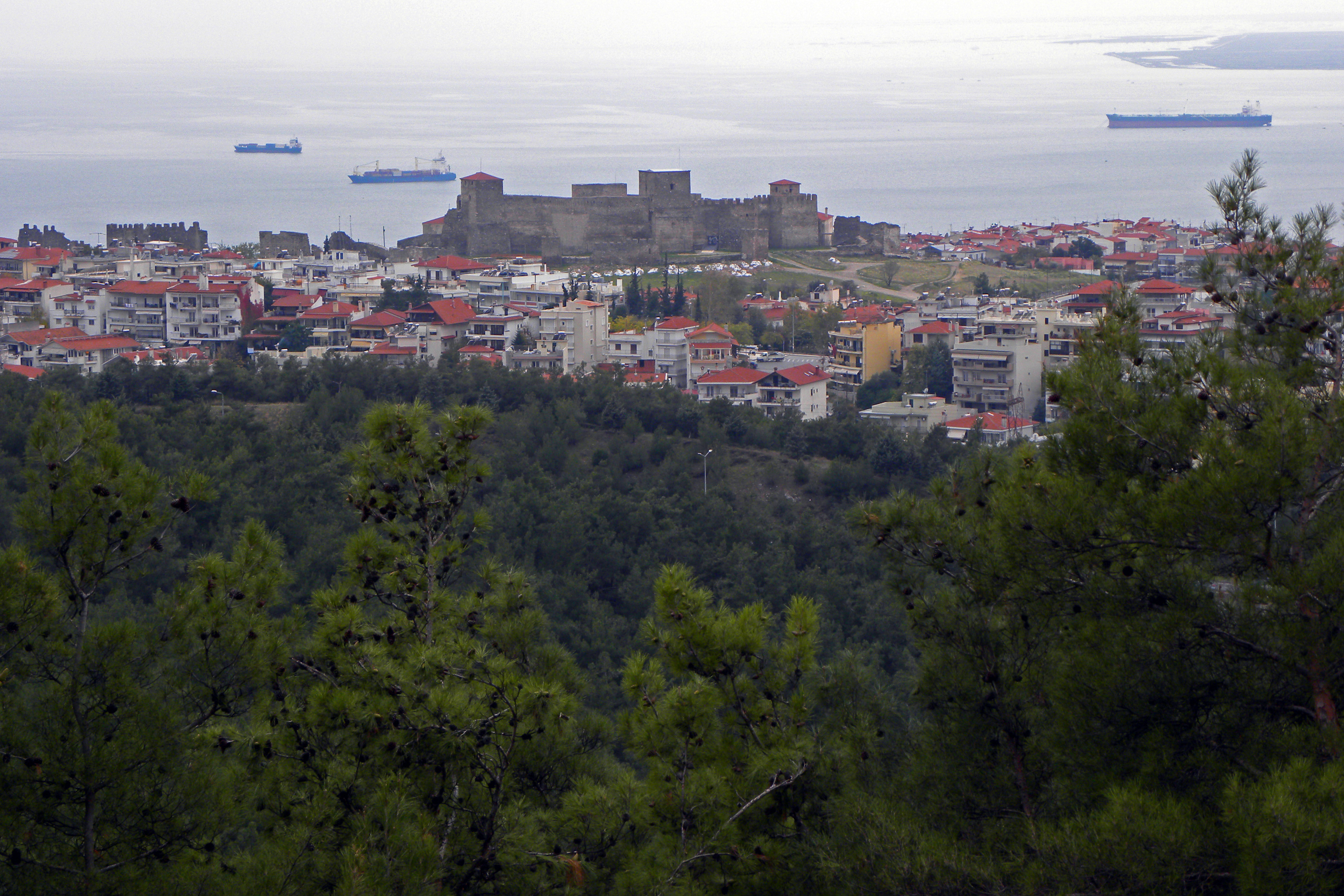
View of Eptapyrgio and Sykies district

The prison functioned until 1989, when it was moved outside the city. The site was then taken over by the Ministry of Culture and the regional Byzantine archaeology service, the 9th Ephorate of Byzantine and Modern Antiquities, which moved some of its offices there. The ephorate had already been active in the restoration works of 1973 on the north-eastern curtain wall, and then again between 1983 and 1985 in the restoration of the damages caused by an earthquake in 1978.

The systematic archaeological study and restoration of the Heptapyrgion began in 1990. The first phase ended in 1995, with the completing of a photogrammetric architectural survey and the creation of a digital model of the fortress. Several institutes participate in the relevant projects: the Aristotle University of Thessaloniki, the Cornell University in the dendrochronology project, the Center for Preservation and Heritage of Mount Athos, and the municipality of Thessaloniki.

Excavations have revealed the existence of an early Christian basilica, and an early Byzantine cemetery church.

== Bibliography ==
- (in Greek and English) Kourkoutidou-Nikolaidou, E.; Tourta, A. Wandering in Byzantine Thessaloniki. pp. 24–26.
- Soustal, Peter (2022). Tabula Imperii Byzantini, Band 11: Makedonien, südlicher Teil (in German). Vienna: Verlag der Österreichischen Akademie der Wissenschaften. ISBN 978-3-7001-8650-2.
- Tsanana, E. (2001). The Eptapyrgion, the citadel of Thessaloniki. Athens: 9th Ephorate of Byzantine Antiquities (Thessaloniki), Ministry of Culture.
- Ćurčić, Sl.; Hatzitryphonos, Ev. (1993). Κοσμική Μεσαιωνική Αρχιτεκτονική στα Βαλκάνια 1300–1500 και η Διατήρησή της ("Secular Medieval Architecture in the Balkans 1200–1500 and its Conservation") (in Greek). Thessaloniki: University Studio Press. pp. 192–195.
