= Thessaloniki =

Second-largest city in Greece

Thessaloniki Θεσσαλονίκη Saloniki
- City
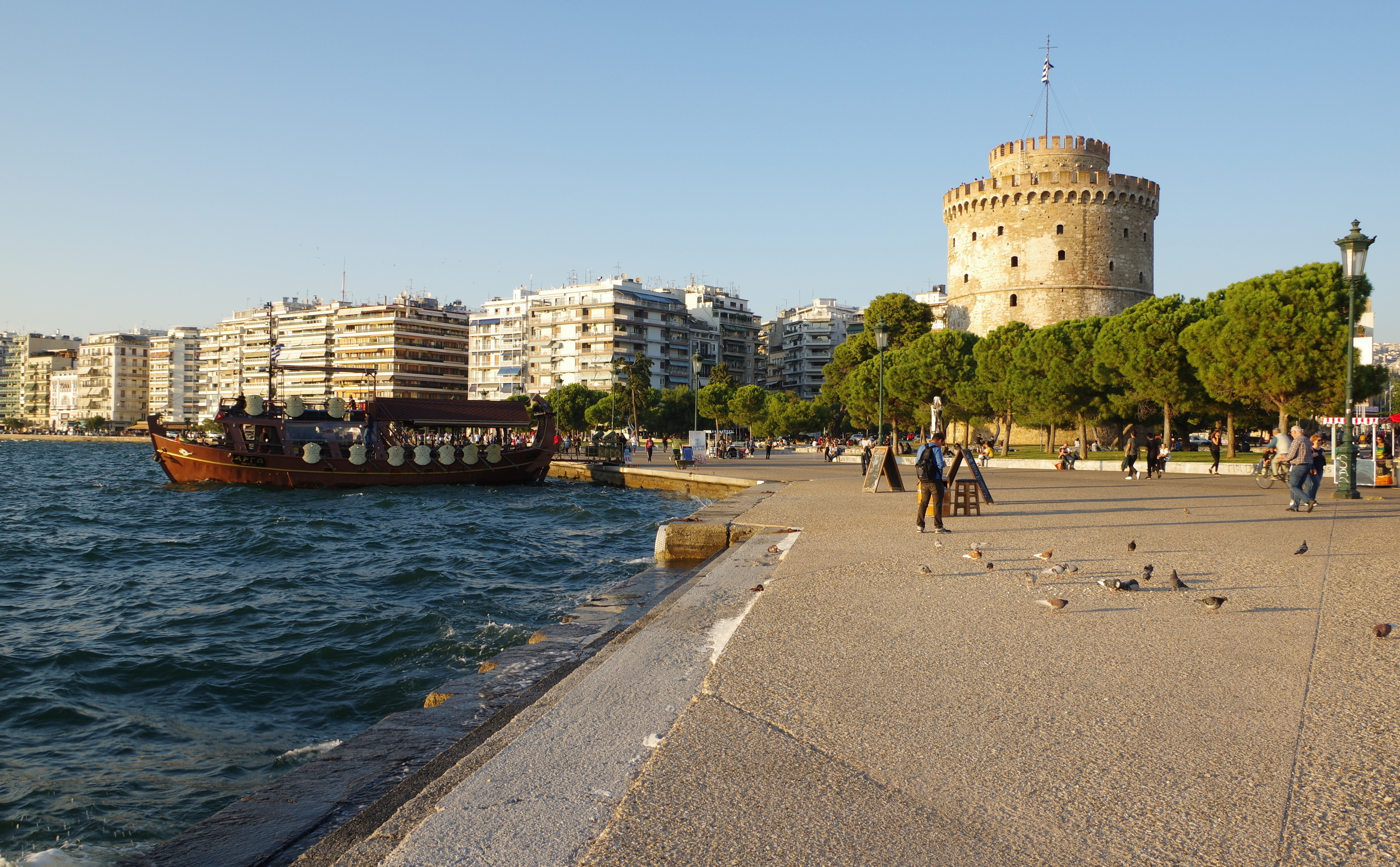
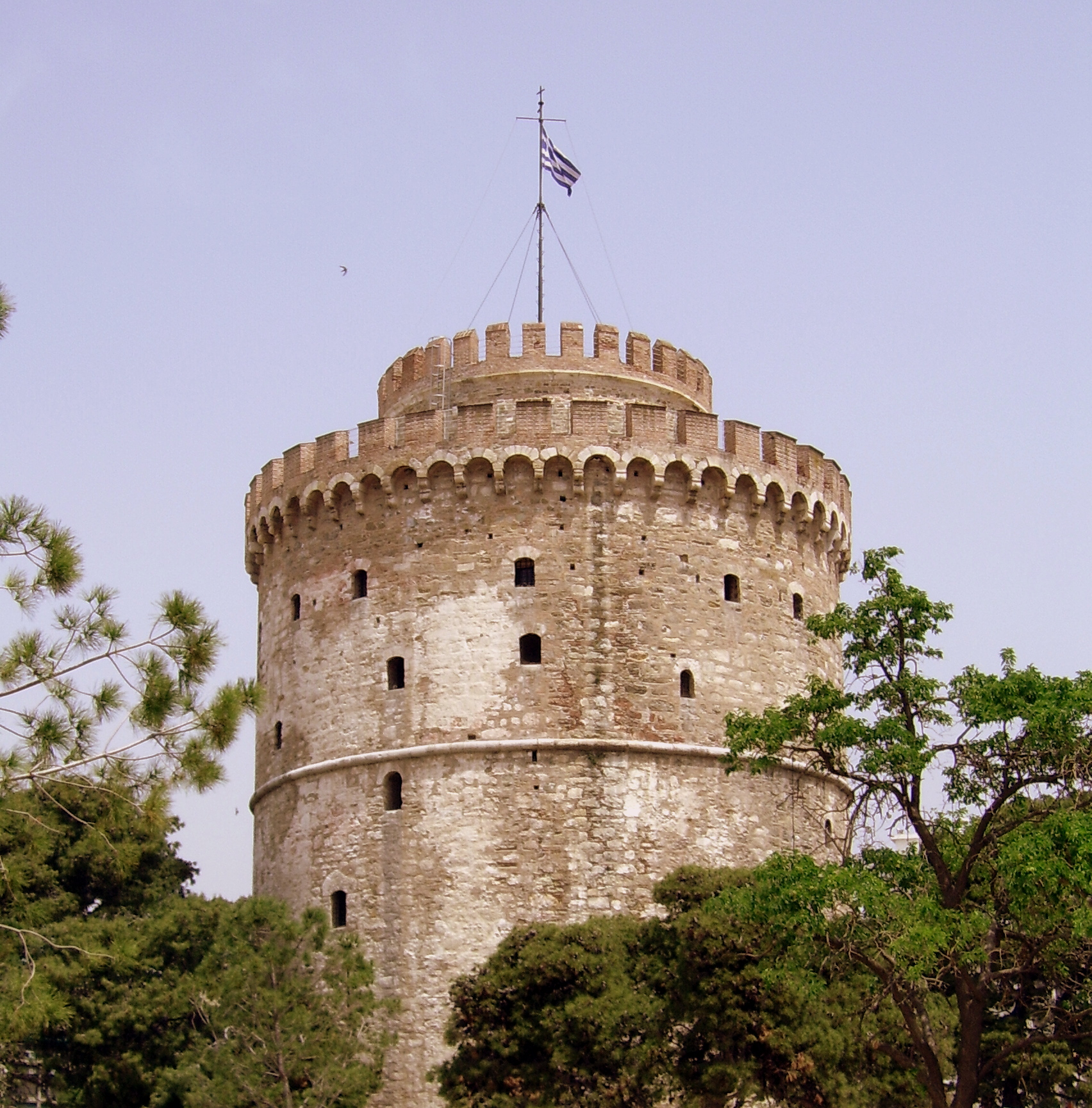
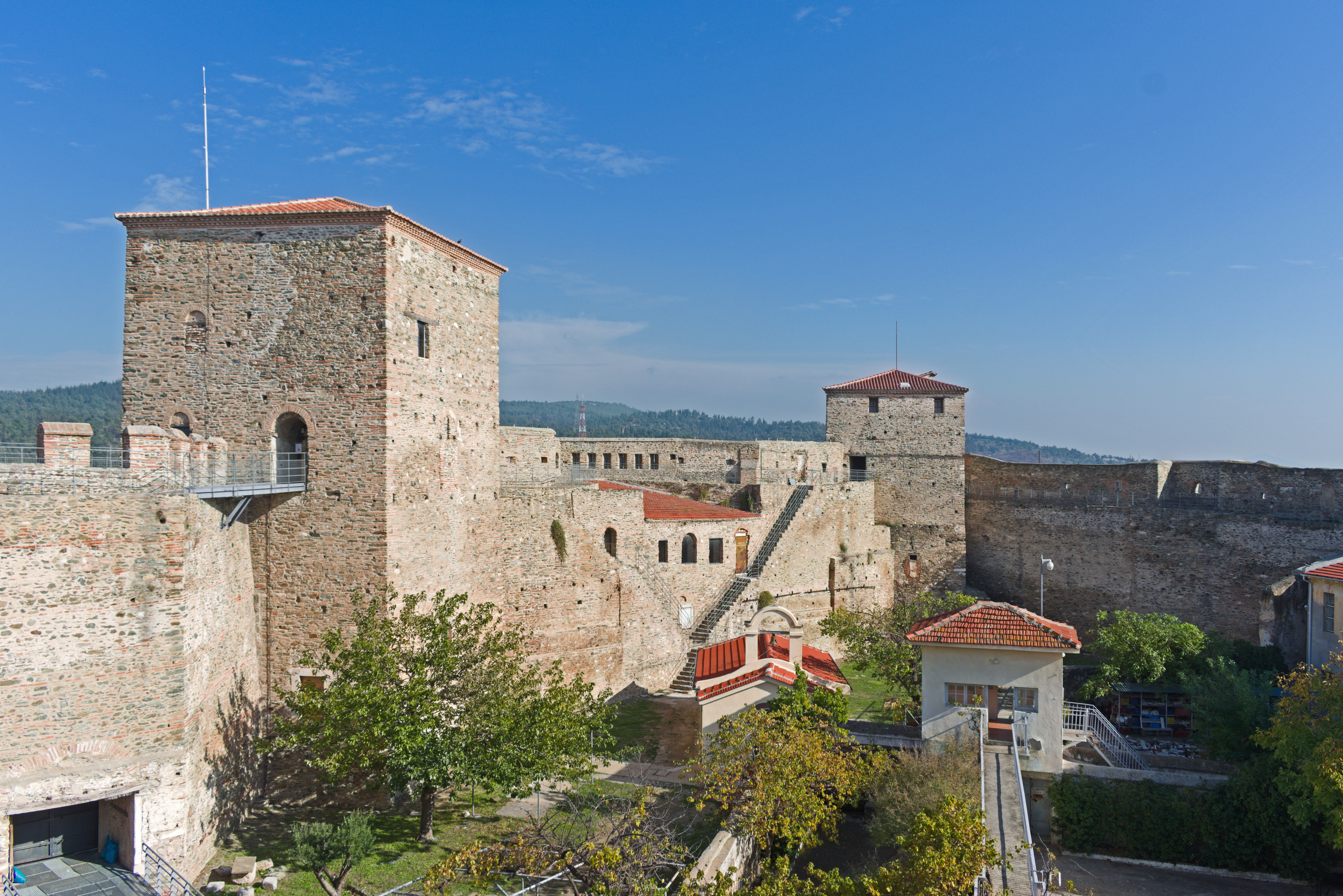
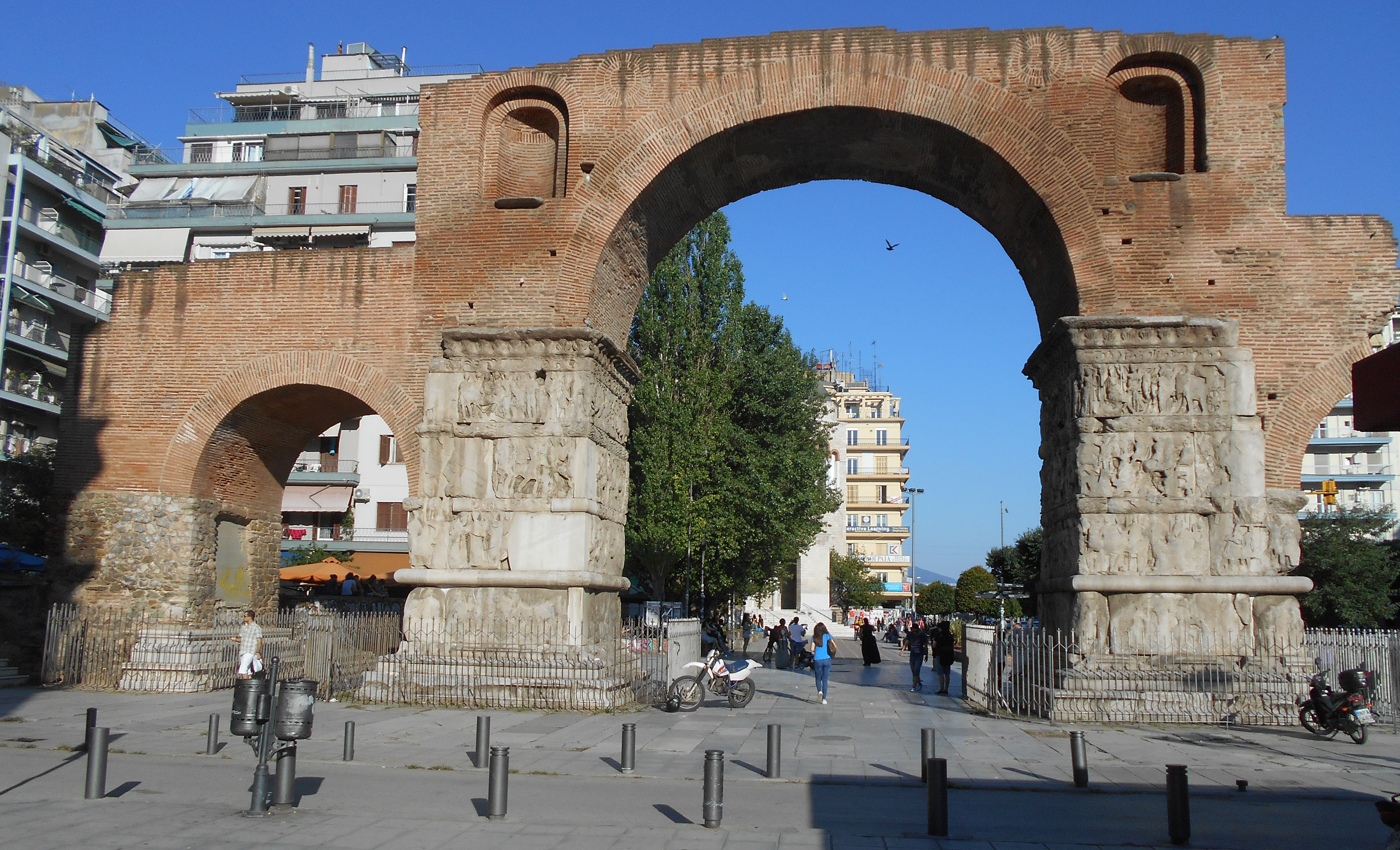
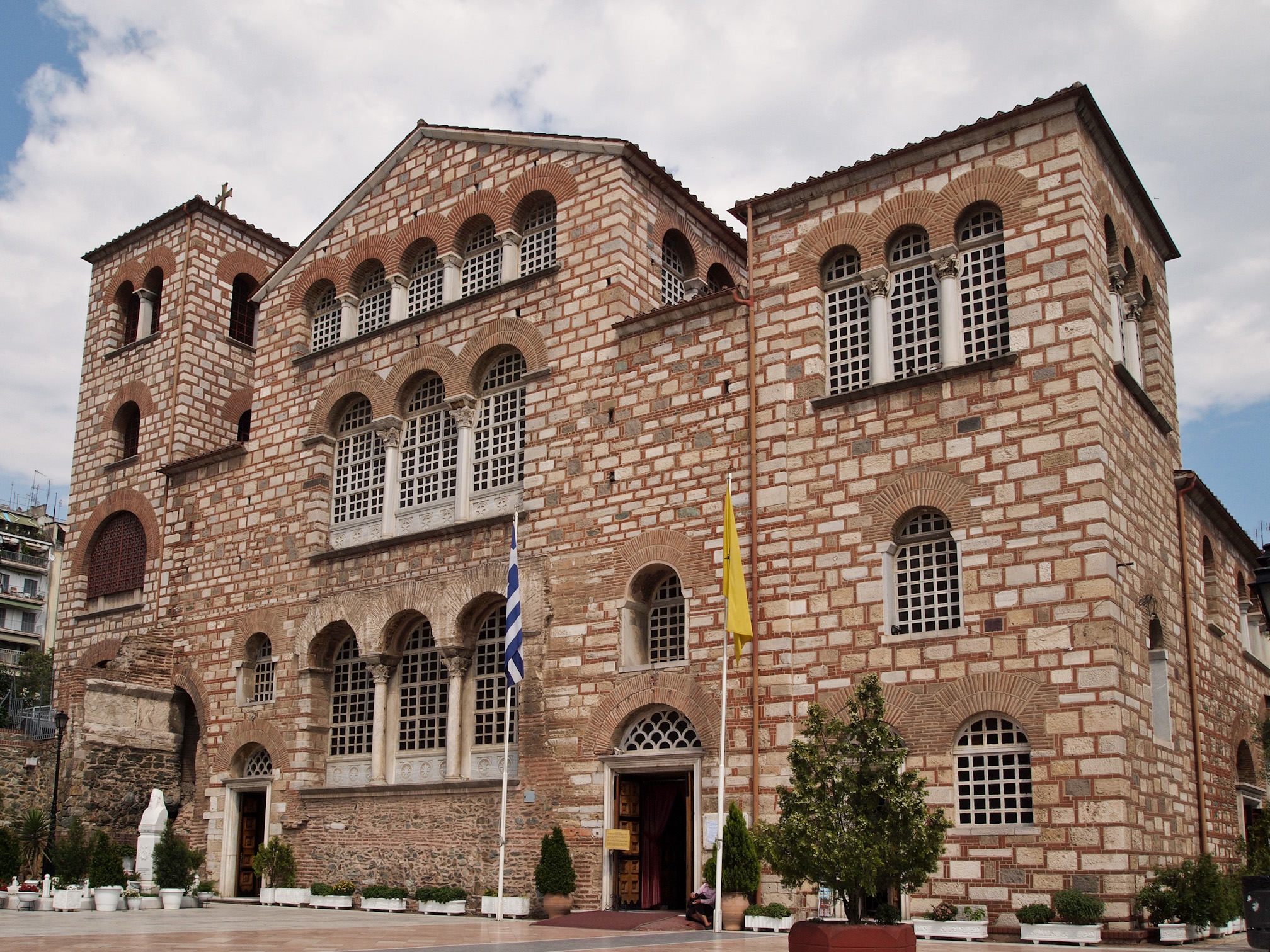
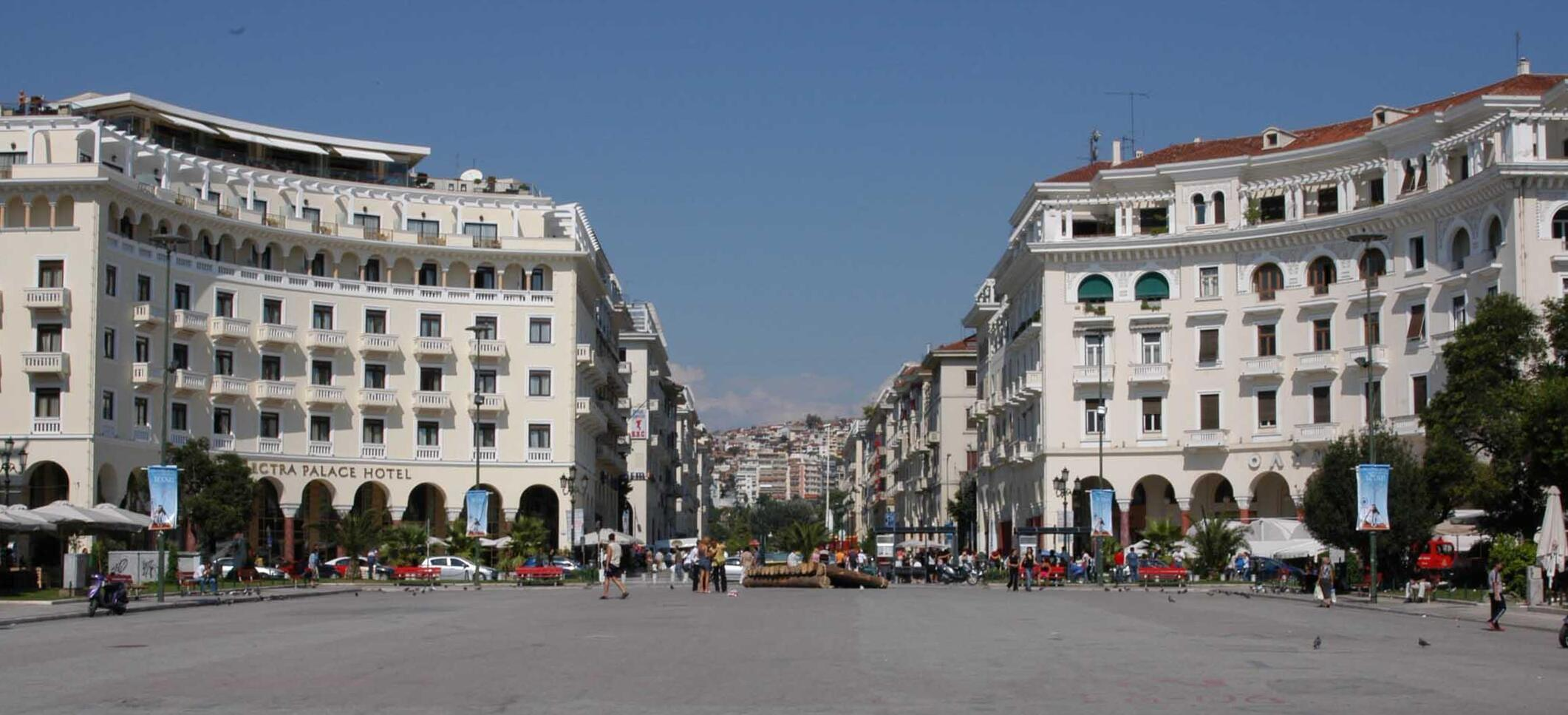
- Panoramic view of Thessaloniki's waterfront and the Thermaic Gulf White Tower of Thessaloniki Heptapyrgion Arch of Galerius Church of Saint Demetrius Aristotle Square

- Flag Seal Logo
- Nickname: The Nymph of the Thermaic Gulf
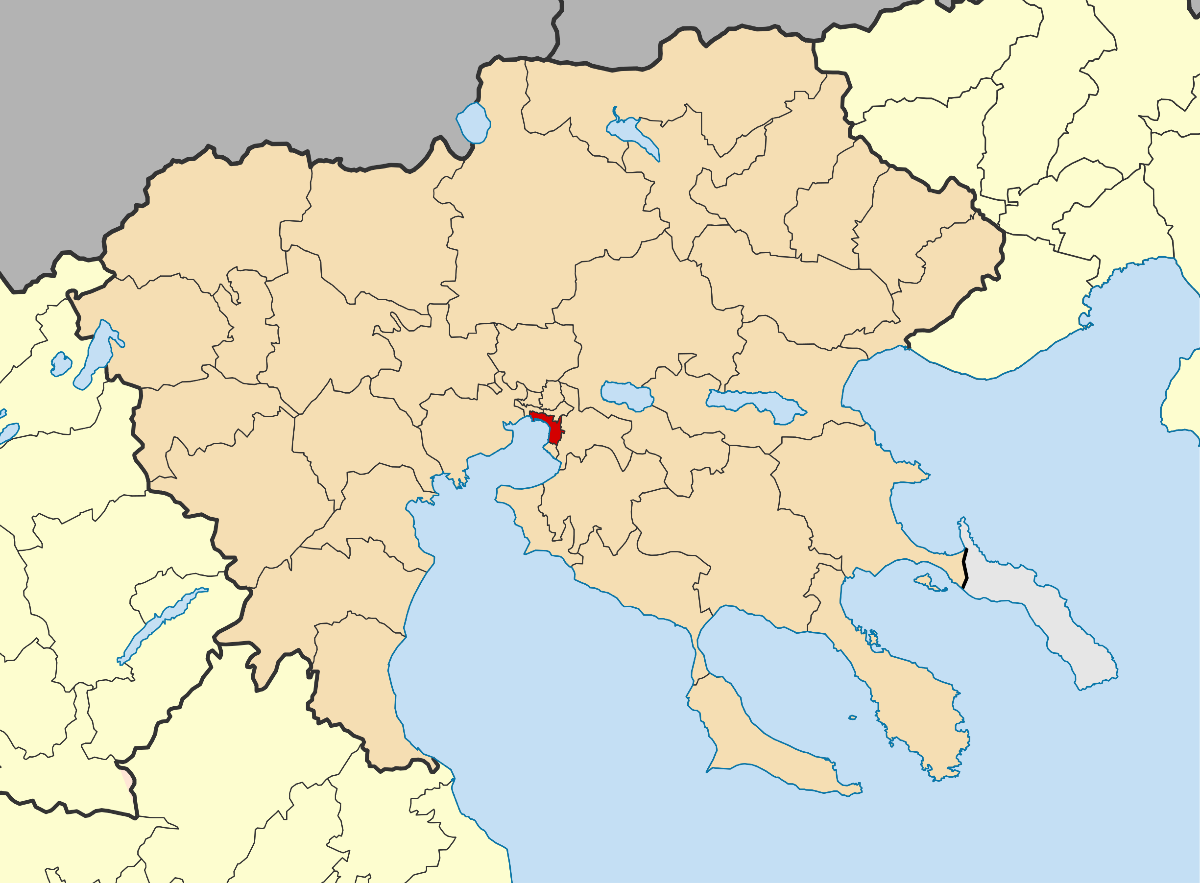
- Location of the Municipality of Thessaloniki within Central Macedonia

- Location within Greece Location within Balkans Location within Europe
- Coordinates: 40°38′25″N 22°56′08″E
- Country: Greece
- Geographic region: Macedonia
- Administrative region: Central Macedonia
- Regional unit: Thessaloniki
- Founded: 315 BC (2341 years ago)
- Incorporated: October 1912 (114 years ago)
- Municipalities: 7

Government
  - Type: Mayor–council government
  - Mayor: Stelios Angeloudis (PASOK)

Area
  - Municipality: 19.307 km^{2} (7.454 sq mi)
  - Urban: 111.703 km^{2} (43.129 sq mi)
  - Metro: 1,285.61 km^{2} (496.38 sq mi)
- Highest elevation: 250 m (820 ft)
- Lowest elevation: 0 m (0 ft)

Population (2021)
  - Municipality: 319,045
  - Rank: 2nd urban, 2nd metro in Greece
  - Density: 16,525/km^{2} (42,799/sq mi)
  - Urban: 802,572
  - Urban density: 7,184.87/km^{2} (18,608.7/sq mi)
  - Metro: 1,091,424
- Demonym(s): Thessalonian, Thessalonican

GDP
  - Metro: €24.24 billion (PPP, 2023p)
- Time zone: UTC+2 (EET)
  - Summer (DST): UTC+3 (EEST)
- Postal codes: 53xxx, 54xxx, 55xxx, 56xxx
- Area code: 2310
- Vehicle registration: NA to NX
- Patron saint: Saint Demetrius (26 October)
- Website: www.thessaloniki.gr

Thessaloniki (/ˌθɛsələˈniːki/; Greek: Θεσσαλονίκη [θesaloˈnici]; also known by various spellings and names) is the capital and largest city of the administrative region of Central Macedonia, and the second-largest city in Greece. It is the largest city of Northern Greece, with over 300,000 in the city proper and slightly over one million inhabitants in its metropolitan area, the capital of the geographic region of Macedonia, and the Decentralized Administration of Macedonia and Thrace. It is also known in Greek as i Symprotévousa (η Συμπρωτεύουσα), literally "the co-capital", a reference to its historical status as the "co-reigning" city (Symvasilévousa/Συμβασιλεύουσα) of the Byzantine Empire alongside Constantinople.

Thessaloniki is located on the Thermaic Gulf, at the northwest corner of the Aegean Sea. It is bounded on the west by the delta of the Axios. The municipality of Thessaloniki, the historical centre, had a population of 319,045 in 2021, while the Thessaloniki metropolitan area had 1,006,112 inhabitants and the greater region had 1,092,919. It is Greece's second major economic, industrial, commercial and political centre, and a major transportation hub for Greece and southeastern Europe, notably through the Port of Thessaloniki. The city is renowned for its festivals, events and vibrant cultural life in general. Events such as the Thessaloniki International Fair and the Thessaloniki International Film Festival are held annually. Thessaloniki was the 2014 European Youth Capital. The city's main university, Aristotle University, is the largest in Greece and the Balkans.

The city was founded in 315 BC by Cassander of Macedon, who named it after his wife Thessalonike, daughter of Philip II of Macedon and sister of Alexander the Great. It was built 40 km southeast of Pella, the capital of the Kingdom of Macedonia. An important metropolis by the Roman period, Thessaloniki was the second largest and wealthiest city of the Byzantine Empire. It was conquered by the Ottomans in 1430 and remained an important seaport and multi-ethnic metropolis during the nearly five centuries of Turkish rule, with churches, mosques, and synagogues co-existing side by side. From the 16th to the 20th centuries, it was the only Jewish-majority city in Europe. It passed from the Ottoman Empire to the Kingdom of Greece on 8 November 1912. Thessaloniki exhibits Byzantine architecture, including numerous Paleochristian and Byzantine monuments, a World Heritage Site, and several Roman, Ottoman and Sephardic Jewish structures.

In 2013, National Geographic Magazine included Thessaloniki in its top tourist destinations worldwide, while in 2014 Financial Times FDI magazine (Foreign Direct Investments) declared Thessaloniki as the best mid-sized European city of the future for human capital and lifestyle.

== Names and etymology ==
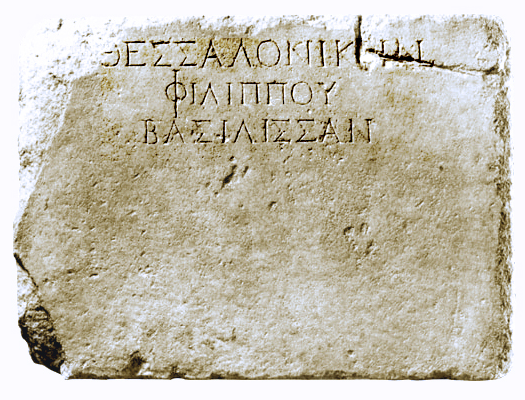
Inscription reading "To Queen Thessalonike, (Daughter) of Philip", Archaeological Museum of Thessaloniki

The original name of the city was Θεσσαλονίκη Thessaloníkē. It was named after the princess Thessalonike of Macedon, the half-sister of Alexander the Great, whose name means "Thessalian victory", from Θεσσαλός Thessalos, and Νίκη 'victory' (Nike), honoring the Macedonian victory at the Battle of Crocus Field (353/352 BC). A popular Greek legend has it that Thessalonike became a mermaid who lived in the Aegean after the death of Alexander the Great.

Minor variants are also found, including Θετταλονίκη Thettaloníkē, Θεσσαλονίκεια Thessaloníkeia, Θεσσαλονείκη Thessaloneíkē, and Θεσσαλονικέων Thessalonikéon.

The name Σαλονίκη Saloníki is first attested in Greek in the Chronicle of the Morea (14th century), and is common in folk songs, but it must have originated earlier, as al-Idrisi called it Salunik already in the 12th century. It is the basis for the city's name in other languages: Солѹнъ (Solunŭ) in Old Church Slavonic, סאלוניקו (Saloniko) in Judeo-Spanish (שאלוניקי prior to the 19th century) סלוניקי (Saloniki) in Hebrew, Selanik in Albanian, سلانیك (Selânik) in Ottoman Turkish and Selanik in modern Turkish, Salonicco in Italian, Solun or Солун in the local and neighboring South Slavic languages, Салоники (Saloníki) in Russian, Sãrunã in Aromanian and Săruna in Megleno-Romanian.

In English, the city can be called Thessaloniki, Salonika, Thessalonica, Salonica, Thessalonika, Saloniki, Thessalonike, or Thessalonice. In printed texts, the most common name and spelling until the early 20th century was Thessalonica (/ˌθɛsələˈnaɪkə, ˌθɛsəˈlɒnɪkə/), matching the Latin name; through most of rest of the 20th century, it was Salonika (/səˈlɒnɪkə, ˌsæləˈniːkə/). By about 1985, the most common single name became Thessaloniki. The forms with the Latin ending -a taken together remain more common than those with the phonetic Greek ending -i and much more common than the ancient transliteration -e.

Thessaloniki was revived as the city's official name in 1912, when it joined the Kingdom of Greece during the Balkan Wars. In local speech, the city's name is typically pronounced with a dark and deep L, characteristic of the accent of the modern Macedonian dialect of Greek. The name is often abbreviated as Θεσ/νίκη.

== History ==
=== From classical antiquity to the Roman Empire ===
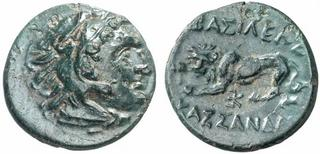
Ancient coin depicting Cassander, son of Antipater, and founder of the city of Thessaloniki

The city was founded around 315 BC by the King Cassander of Macedon, on or near the site of the ancient town of Therma and 26 other local villages. He named it after his wife Thessalonike, a half-sister of Alexander the Great and princess of Macedonia as daughter of Philip II. Under the kingdom of Macedonia, the city retained its own autonomy and parliament and evolved to become the most important city in Macedonia. Nonetheless, Pella remained the capital of Macedon until its fall.

In 128 BC, twenty years after the fall of the Kingdom of Macedonia, Thessalonica was made the capital of the Roman province of Macedonia. Thessalonica became a free city of the Roman Republic under Mark Antony in 41 BC. It grew to be an important trade hub located on the Via Egnatia, the road connecting Dyrrhachium with Byzantium, which facilitated trade between Thessaloniki and great centres of commerce such as Rome and Byzantium. Thessaloniki also lies at the southern end of the main north–south route through the Balkans along the valleys of the Morava and Axios river valleys, thereby linking the Balkans with the rest of Greece. The city became the capital of one of the four Roman districts of Macedonia.

At the time of the Roman Empire, about 50 AD, Thessaloniki was also one of the early centres of Christianity; while on his second missionary journey, Paul the Apostle visited this city's chief synagogue on three Sabbaths and sowed the seeds for Thessaloniki's first Christian church. Later, Paul wrote letters to the new church at Thessaloniki, with two letters to the church under his name appearing in the Biblical canon as First and Second Thessalonians. Some scholars hold that the First Epistle to the Thessalonians is the first written book of the New Testament.

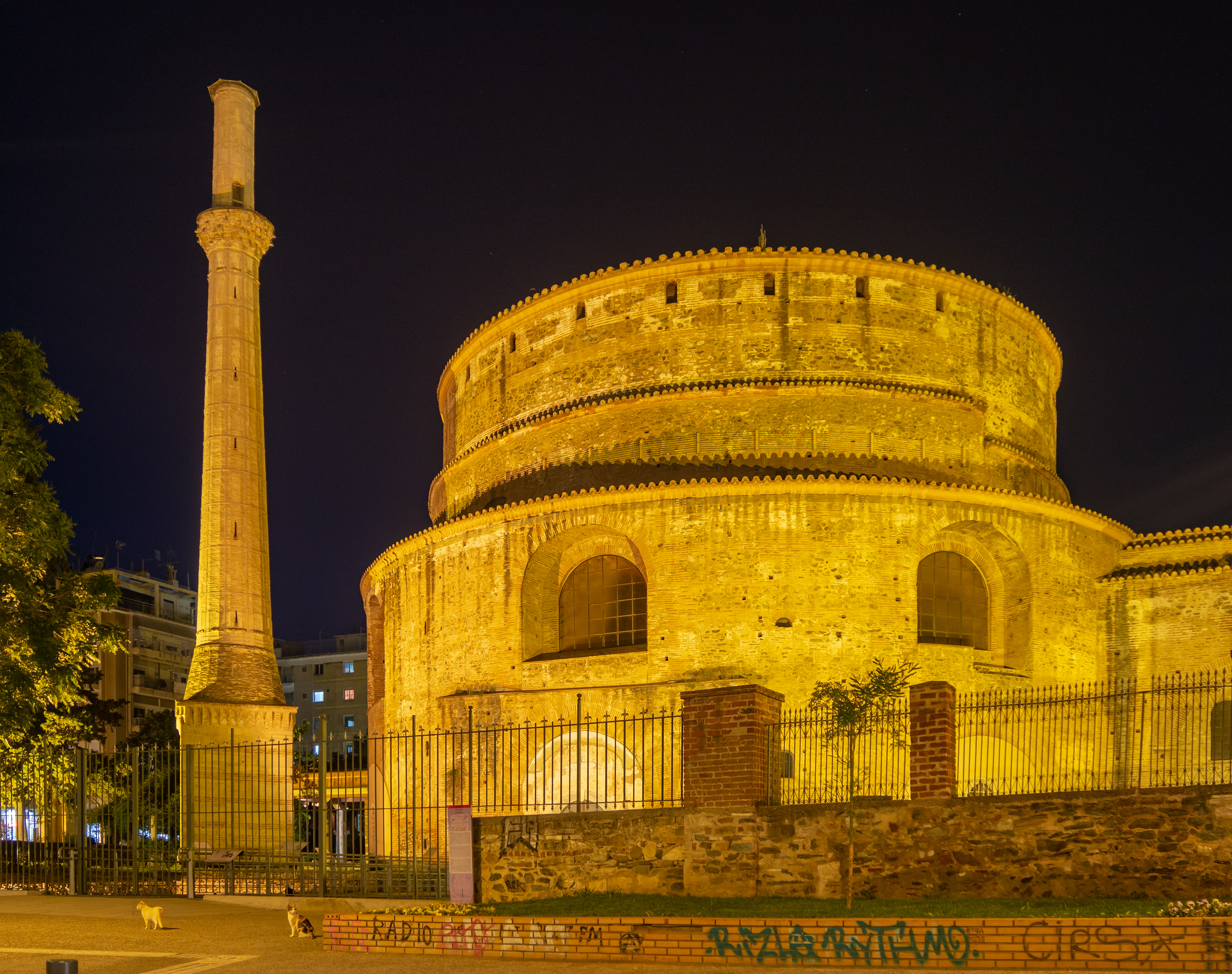
The fourth-century AD Rotunda of Galerius, one of several Roman monuments in the city and a UNESCO World Heritage Site

In 306 AD, Thessaloniki acquired a patron saint, St. Demetrius, a Christian whom Galerius is said to have put to death. Most scholars agree with Hippolyte Delehaye's theory that Demetrius was not a Thessaloniki native, but his veneration was transferred to Thessaloniki when it replaced Sirmium as the main military base in the Balkans. A basilical church dedicated to St. Demetrius, Hagios Demetrios, was first built in the fifth century AD and is now a UNESCO World Heritage Site.

When the Roman Empire was divided into the tetrarchy, Thessaloniki became the administrative capital of one of the four portions of the Empire under Galerius Maximianus Caesar, where Galerius commissioned an imperial palace, a new hippodrome, a triumphal arch and a mausoleum, among other structures.

Thessaloniki remained the administrative center of the Diocese of Macedonia. In 379, when the Roman Prefecture of Illyricum was divided between the East and West Roman Empires, Thessaloniki became the capital of the new Prefecture of Illyricum. The following year, the Edict of Thessalonica made Christianity the state religion of the Roman Empire. In 390, troops under the Roman Emperor Theodosius I led a massacre against the inhabitants of Thessalonica, who had risen in revolt against the detention of a favorite charioteer. By the time of the Fall of Rome in 476, Thessaloniki was the second-largest city of the Eastern Roman Empire.

=== Byzantine era and Middle Ages ===
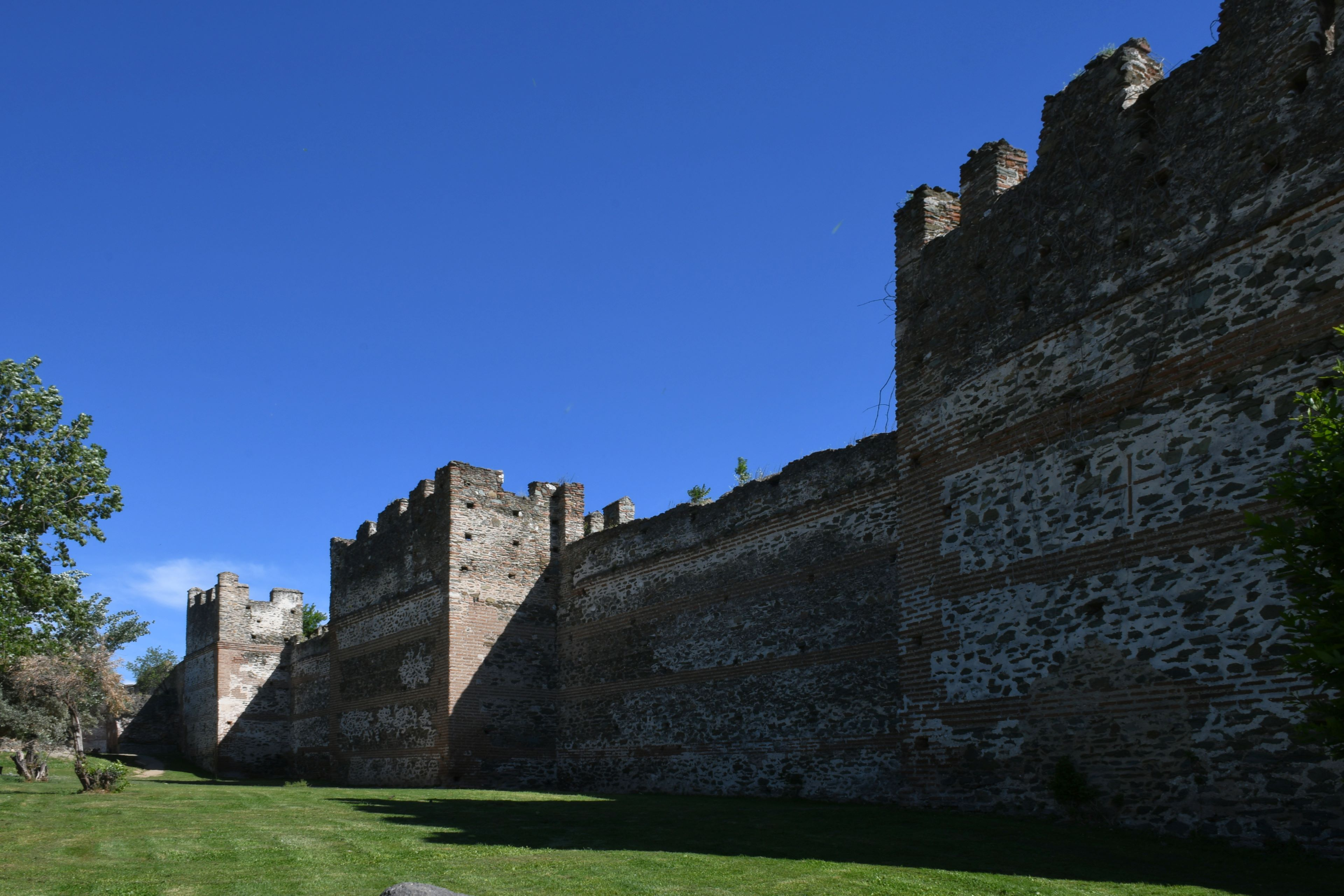
Section of the Walls of Thessaloniki

From the first years of the Byzantine Empire, Thessaloniki was considered the second city in the Empire after Constantinople, both in terms of wealth and size, with a population of 150,000 in the mid-12th century. The city held this status until its transfer to Venetian control in 1423. In the 14th century, the city's population exceeded 100,000 to 150,000, making it larger than London at the time.

During the sixth and seventh centuries, the area around Thessaloniki was invaded by Avars and Slavs, who unsuccessfully laid siege to the city several times, as narrated in the Miracles of Saint Demetrius. The written sources stipulate that many Slavs settled in the hinterland of Thessaloniki which became known as 'Macedonian Sclavinia'. In the ninth century, the Byzantine missionaries Cyril and Methodius, both natives of the city, created the first literary language of the Slavs, the Old Church Slavonic, most likely based on the Slavic dialect used in the hinterland of their hometown.

A naval attack led by Byzantine converts to Islam (including Leo of Tripoli) in 904 resulted in the sack of the city.

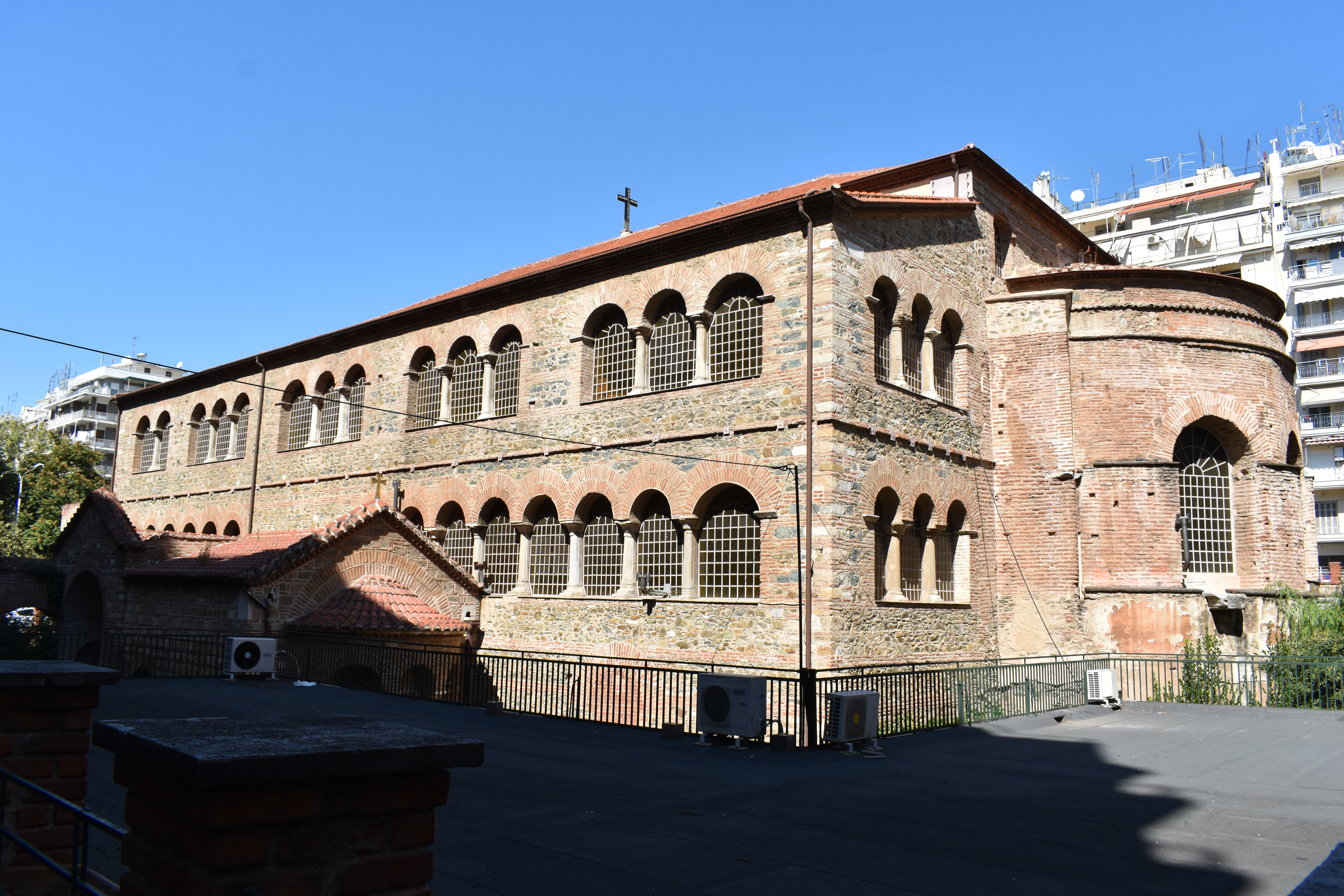
Church of the Acheiropoietos (5th century) at the city's centre

The economic expansion of the city continued through the 12th century as the rule of the Komnenoi emperors expanded Byzantine control to the north. The city was sacked again in 1185 by Normans from the Kingdom of Sicily.

Thessaloniki passed out of Byzantine hands in 1204, when Constantinople was captured by the forces of the Fourth Crusade and incorporated the city and its surrounding territories in the Kingdom of Thessalonica — which then became the largest vassal of the Latin Empire. In 1224, the Kingdom of Thessalonica was overrun by the Despotate of Epirus, a remnant of the former Byzantine Empire, under Theodore Komnenos Doukas who crowned himself Emperor, and the city became the capital of the short-lived Empire of Thessalonica. Following his defeat at Klokotnitsa however in 1230, the Empire of Thessalonica became a vassal state of the Second Bulgarian Empire until it was recovered again in 1246, this time by the Nicaean Empire.

In 1342, the city saw the rise of the Commune of the Zealots, an anti-aristocratic party formed of sailors and the poor, which is nowadays described as social-revolutionary. The city was practically independent of the rest of the Empire, as it had its own government, a form of republic. The zealot movement was overthrown in 1350, and the city was reunited with the rest of the Empire.

The capture of Gallipoli by the Ottomans in 1354 kicked off a rapid Turkish expansion in the southern Balkans, conducted both by the Ottomans themselves and by semi-independent Turkish ghazi warrior-bands. By 1369, the Ottomans conquered Adrianople (modern Edirne), which became their new capital until 1453. Thessalonica, ruled by Manuel II Palaiologos (r. 1391–1425) itself surrendered after a lengthy siege in 1383–1387, along with most of eastern and central Macedonia, to the forces of Sultan Murad I. Initially, the surrendered cities were allowed complete autonomy in exchange for payment of the kharaj poll-tax. Following the death of Emperor John V Palaiologos in 1391, however, Manuel II escaped Ottoman custody and went to Constantinople, where he was crowned emperor, succeeding his father. This angered Sultan Bayezid I, who laid waste to the remaining Byzantine territories, and then turned on Chrysopolis, which was captured by storm and largely destroyed. Thessalonica also submitted again to Ottoman rule at this time, possibly after brief resistance, but was treated more leniently: although the city was brought under full Ottoman control, the Christian population and the Church retained most of their possessions, and the city retained its institutions.

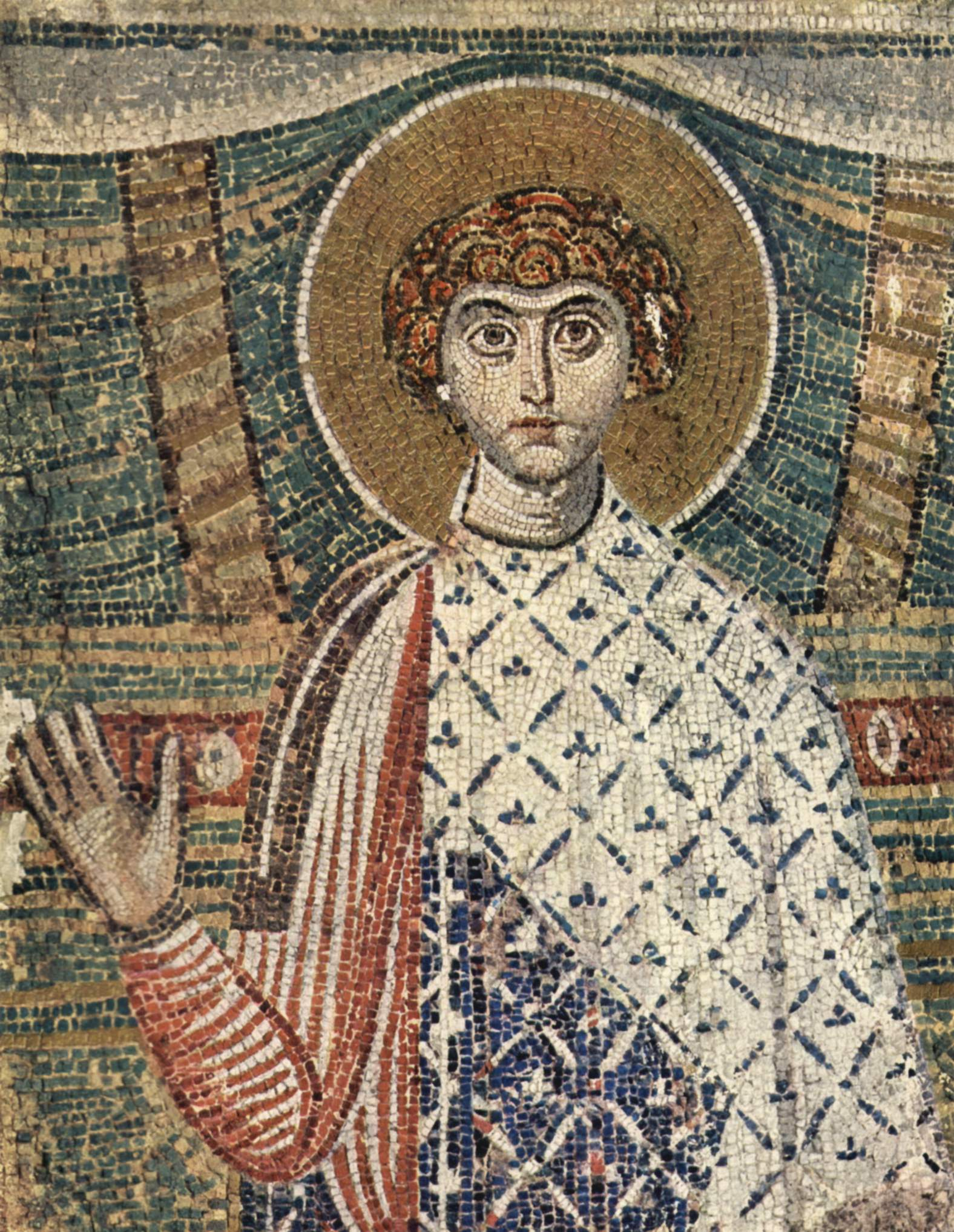
A mosaic of Saint George in Saint Demetrios Church

Thessalonica remained in Ottoman hands until 1403, when Emperor Manuel II sided with Bayezid's eldest son Süleyman in the Ottoman succession struggle that broke out following the crushing defeat and capture of Bayezid at the Battle of Ankara against Tamerlane in 1402. In exchange for his support, in the Treaty of Gallipoli the Byzantine emperor secured the return of Thessalonica, part of its hinterland, the Chalcidice peninsula, and the coastal region between the rivers Strymon and Pineios. Thessalonica and the surrounding region were given as an autonomous appanage to John VII Palaiologos. After his death in 1408, he was succeeded by Manuel's third son, the Despot Andronikos Palaiologos, who was supervised by Demetrios Leontares until 1415.

Thessalonica enjoyed a period of relative peace and prosperity after 1403, as the Turks were preoccupied with their own civil war, but was attacked by the rival Ottoman pretenders in 1412 (by Musa Çelebi) and 1416 (during the uprising of Mustafa Çelebi against Mehmed I). Once the Ottoman civil war ended, the Turkish pressure on the city began to increase again. Just as during the 1383–1387 siege, this led to a sharp division of opinion within the city between factions supporting resistance, if necessary with Western help, or submission to the Ottomans.

In 1423, Despot Andronikos Palaiologos ceded it to the Republic of Venice with the hope that it could be protected from the Ottomans, who were besieging the city. The Venetians held Thessaloniki until it was captured by the Ottoman Sultan Murad II on 29 March 1430. Thus began 500 years of Ottoman Turkish rule in Thessaloniki/Selânik, which would profoundly shape the city's unique multicultural character and urban architecture.

=== Ottoman period ===
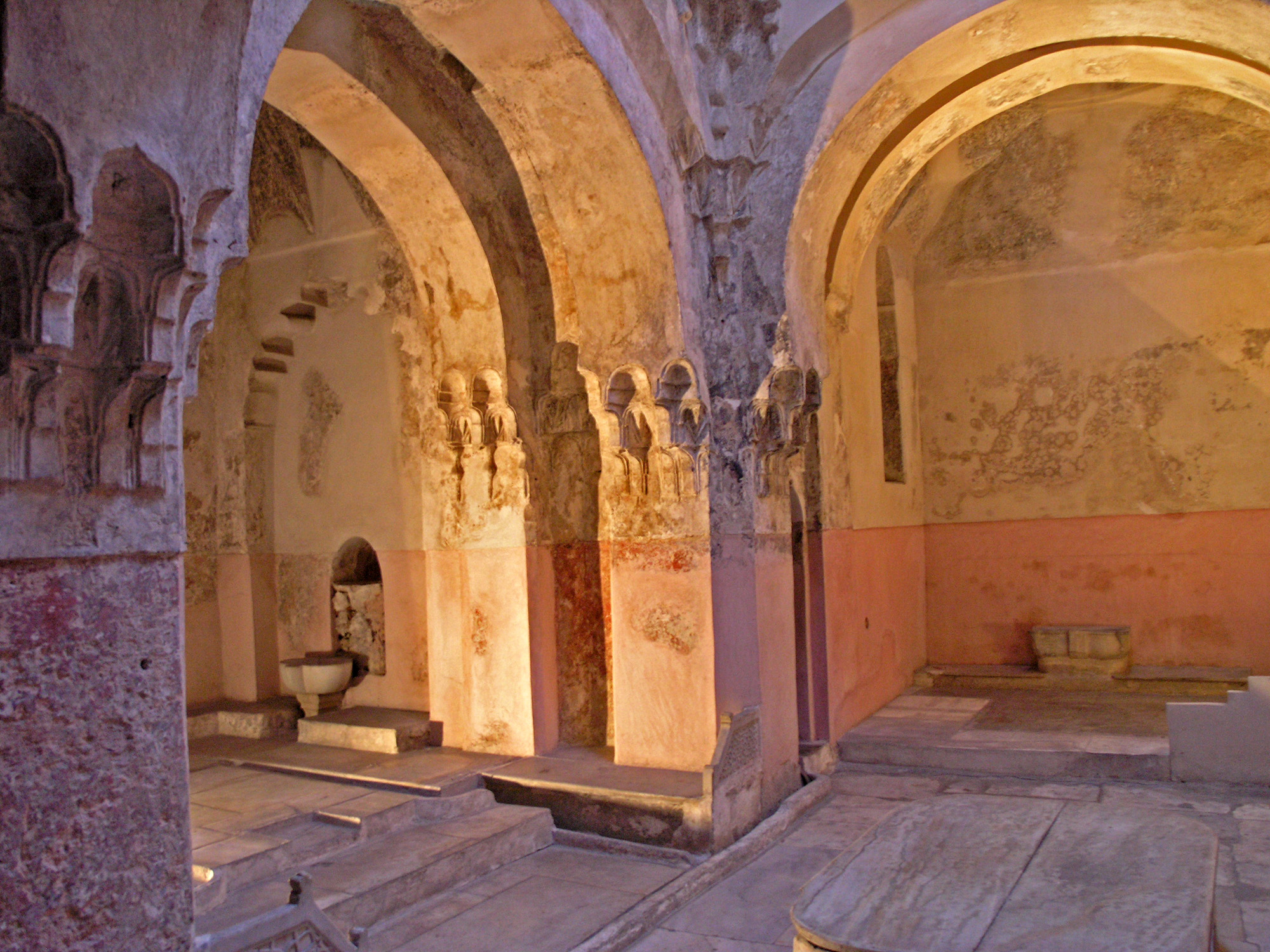
Hot chamber of the men's baths in the Bey Hamam (1444)

When Sultan Murad II captured Thessaloniki and sacked it in 1430, contemporary reports estimated that about one-fifth of the city's population was enslaved. Ottoman artillery was used to secure the city's capture and bypass its double walls. Upon the conquest of Thessaloniki, some of its inhabitants escaped, including intellectuals such as Theodorus Gaza "Thessalonicensis" and Andronicus Callistus. However, the change of sovereignty from the Byzantine Empire to the Ottoman one did not affect the city's prestige as a major imperial city and trading hub. Thessaloniki and Smyrna, although smaller in size than Constantinople, were the Ottoman Empire's most important trading hubs. Thessaloniki's importance was mostly in the field of shipping, but also in manufacturing, while most of the city's tradespeople were Jewish.

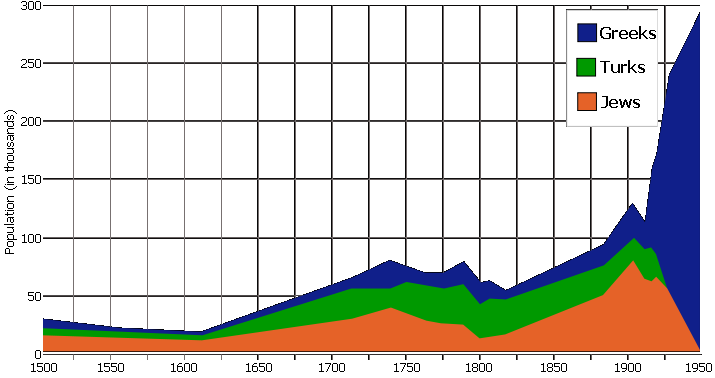
Demographics of Thessaloniki between 1500 and 1950

During the Ottoman period, the city's population of Ottoman Muslims (including those of Turkish origin, as well as Albanian Muslim, Bulgarian Muslim, especially the Pomaks and Greek Muslim of convert origin) and Muslim Roma like the Sepečides Romani grew substantially. According to the 1478 census Selânik (Ottoman Turkish: سلانیك), as the city came to be known in Ottoman Turkish, had 6,094 Christian Orthodox households, 4,320 Muslim ones, and some Catholic. No Jews were recorded in the census, suggesting that the subsequent influx of Jewish population was not linked to the already existing Romaniote community.

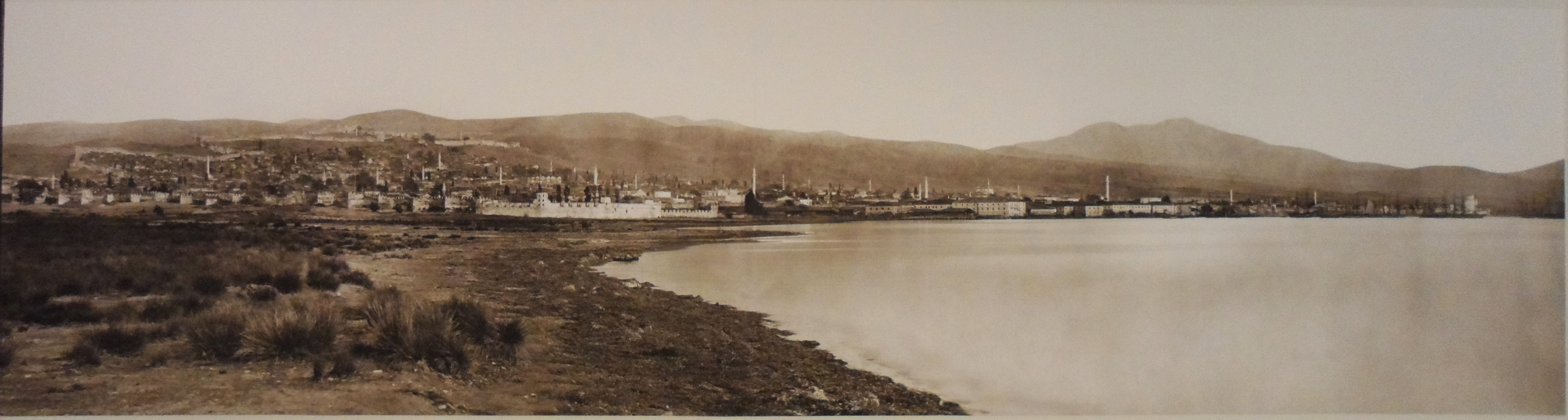
The oldest surviving photograph of Thessaloniki (Selânik), taken in 1863 by Josef Székely from the area called Beş Çınar (Five Sycamores), a popular spot for panoramic vistas during the Ottoman era.

Soon after the turn of the 15th to 16th century, however, nearly 20,000 Sephardic Jews immigrated to Greece from the Iberian Peninsula following their expulsion from Spain by the 1492 Alhambra Decree. By c. 1500, the number of Christians had grown to 7,986, the Muslims to 8,575, and the Jews to 3,770. In 1519, according to Ottoman archives, the population of Thessaloniki numbered 1,374 Muslim households and 282 bachelors, for a total of 6,870, 1,078 Christian households and 355 bachelors, for a total of about 6,635, and 3,143 Hebrew households with 530 bachelors, for a total of 15,715, 54% of the city's population. Some historians consider the Ottoman regime's invitation to Jewish settlement was a strategy to prevent the Christian population from dominating the city. The city became both the largest Jewish city in the world and the only Jewish majority city in the world in the 16th century. As a result, Thessaloniki attracted persecuted Jews from all over the world.

Thessaloniki was the capital of the Sanjak of Selanik within the wider Rumeli Eyalet (Balkans) until 1826, and subsequently the capital of Selanik Eyalet (after 1867, the Selanik Vilayet). This consisted of the sanjaks of Selanik, Serres and Drama between 1826 and 1912.

With the break out of the Greek War of Independence in the spring of 1821, the governor Yusuf Bey imprisoned in his headquarters more than 400 hostages. On 18 May, when Yusuf learned of the insurrection to the villages of Chalkidiki, he ordered half of his hostages to be slaughtered before his eyes. The mulla of Thessaloniki, Hayrıülah, gives the following description of Yusuf's retaliations: "Every day and every night you hear nothing in the streets of Thessaloniki but shouting and moaning. It seems that Yusuf Bey, the Yeniceri Agasi, the Subaşı, the hocas and the ulemas have all gone raving mad." It would take until the end of the century for the city's Greek community to recover.

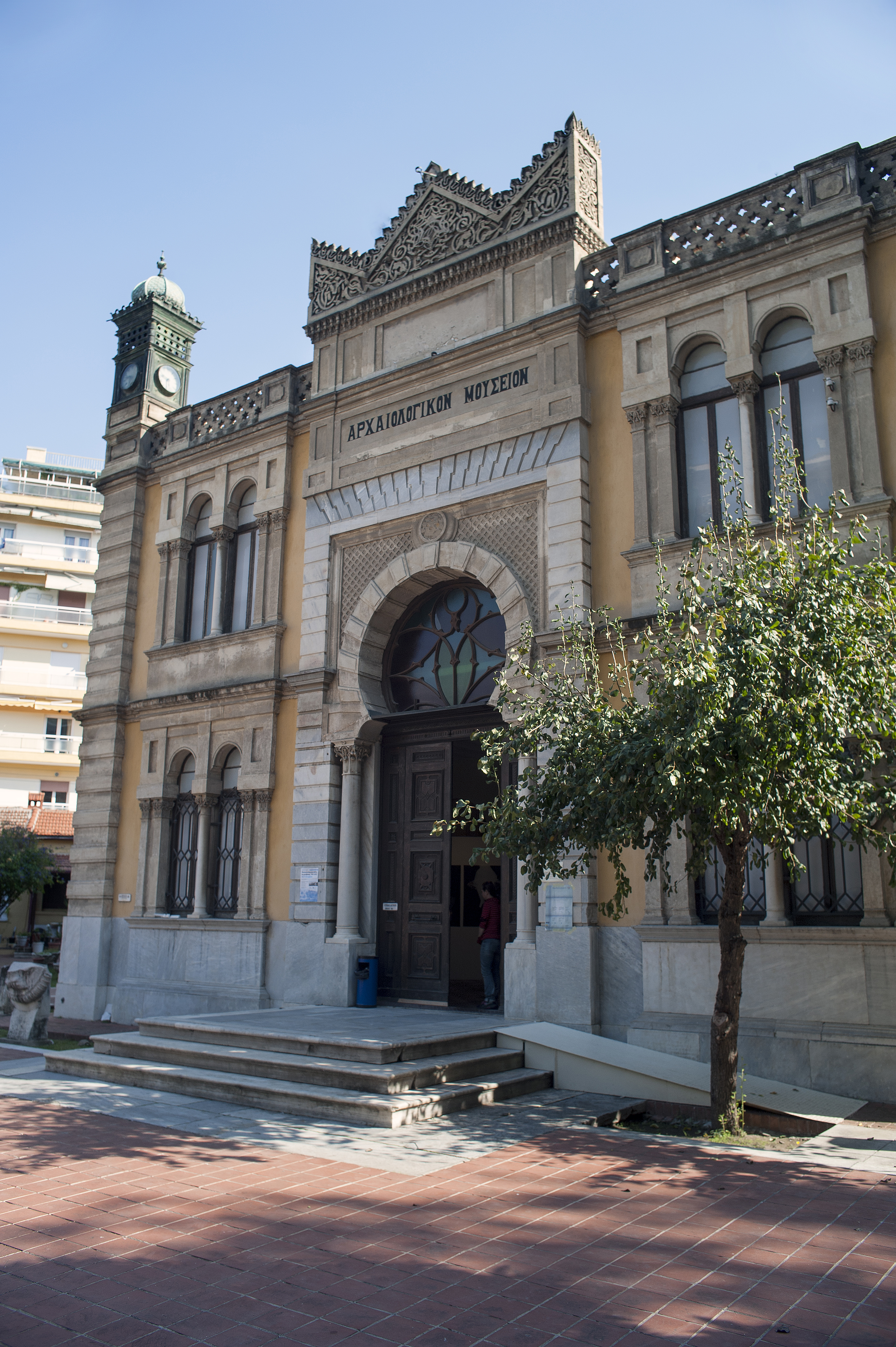
The Yeni Mosque (New Mosque), designed by architect Vitaliano Poselli, was built in 1902 in the Turkish Neoclassical style, with elements of Baroque and Renaissance architecture. Variously repurposed throughout the 20th century, it was reopened for regular Muslim worship in 2024.

Thessaloniki was also a Janissary stronghold where novice Janissaries were trained. In June 1826, regular Ottoman soldiers attacked and destroyed the Janissary base in Thessaloniki while also killing over 10,000 Janissaries, an event known as The Auspicious Incident in Ottoman history. In 1870–1917, driven by economic growth, the city's population expanded by 70%, reaching 135,000 in 1917.

The last few decades of Ottoman control over the city were an era of revival, particularly in terms of the city's infrastructure. It was at that time that the Ottoman administration of the city acquired an "official" face with the creation of the Government House while a number of new public buildings were built in the eclectic style in order to project the European face both of Thessaloniki and the Ottoman Empire. The city walls were torn down between 1869 and 1889, efforts for a planned expansion of the city are evident as early as 1879, the first tram service started in 1888 and the city streets were illuminated with electric lamp posts in 1908. In 1888, the Oriental Railway connected Thessaloniki to Central Europe via rail through Belgrade and to Monastir in 1893, while the Thessaloniki–Istanbul Junction Railway connected it to Constantinople in 1896.

Mustafa Kemal Atatürk, founder of the modern republic of Turkey, was born in Thessaloniki (then known as Selânik in Ottoman Turkish) in 1881. His birthplace on İslahhane Caddesi (now 17 Apostolou Street) is now the Atatürk Museum and forms part of the Turkish consulate complex.

Other notable figures in Turkish and Ottoman history who were born in the city during the Ottoman era include poet and playwright Nâzım Hikmet, Turkey's first female journalist Sabiha Sertel, the Ottoman chronicler Mustafa Selaniki, Turkish patriot Hasan Tahsin (no relation to Hasan Tahsin Pasha), and Young Turk politician Mehmed Cavid Bey.

=== 20th century and beyond ===
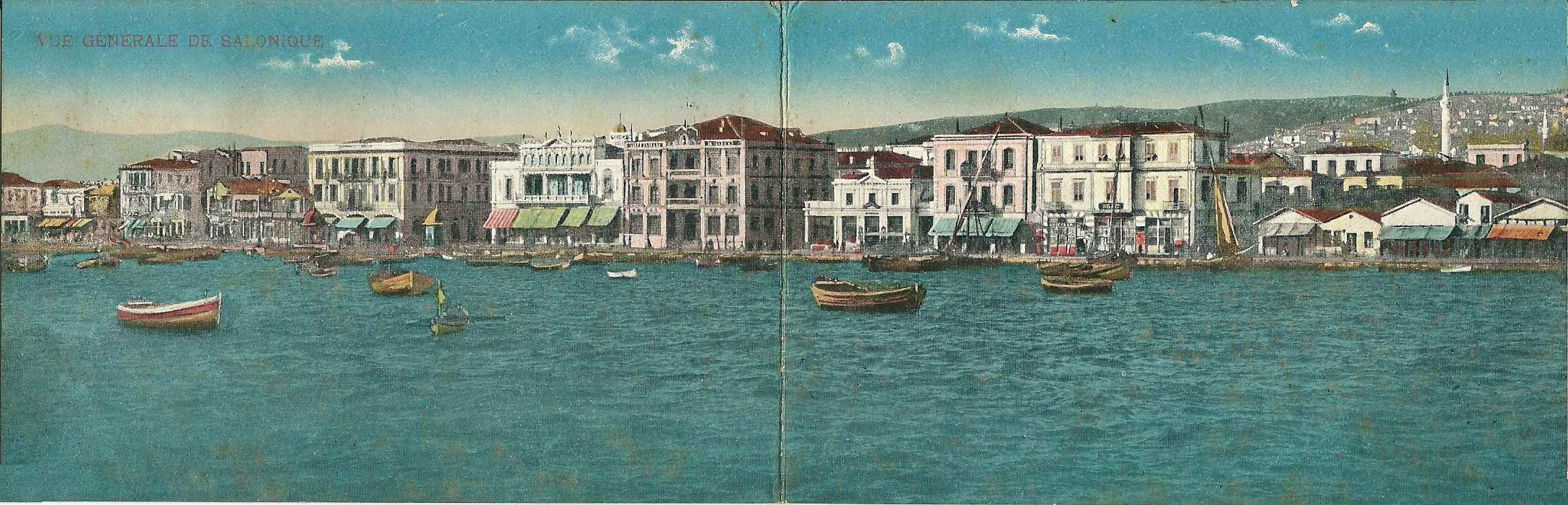
Painting of the seafront of Thessaloniki in 1917

In the early 20th century, Thessaloniki was in the centre of radical activities by various groups; the Internal Macedonian Revolutionary Organization, founded in 1897, and the Greek Macedonian Committee, founded in 1903. In 1903, a Bulgarian anarchist group known as the Boatmen of Thessaloniki planted bombs in several buildings in Thessaloniki, including the Ottoman Bank, with some assistance from the IMRO. The Greek consulate in Ottoman Thessaloniki (now the Museum of the Macedonian Struggle) served as the centre of operations for the Greek guerillas.

During this period, and since the 16th century, Thessaloniki's Jewish element was the most dominant; it was the only city in Europe where the Jews were a majority of the total population. The city was ethnically diverse and cosmopolitan. In 1890, its population had risen to 118,000, 47% of which were Jews, followed by Turks (22%), Greeks (14%), Bulgarians (8%), Roma (2%), and others (7%). By 1913, the ethnic composition of the city had changed so that the population stood at 157,889, with Jews at 39%, followed again by Turks (29%), Greeks (25%), Bulgarians (4%), Roma (2%), and others at 1%. Many varied religions were practiced and many languages spoken, including Judeo-Spanish, a dialect of Spanish spoken by the city's Jews.

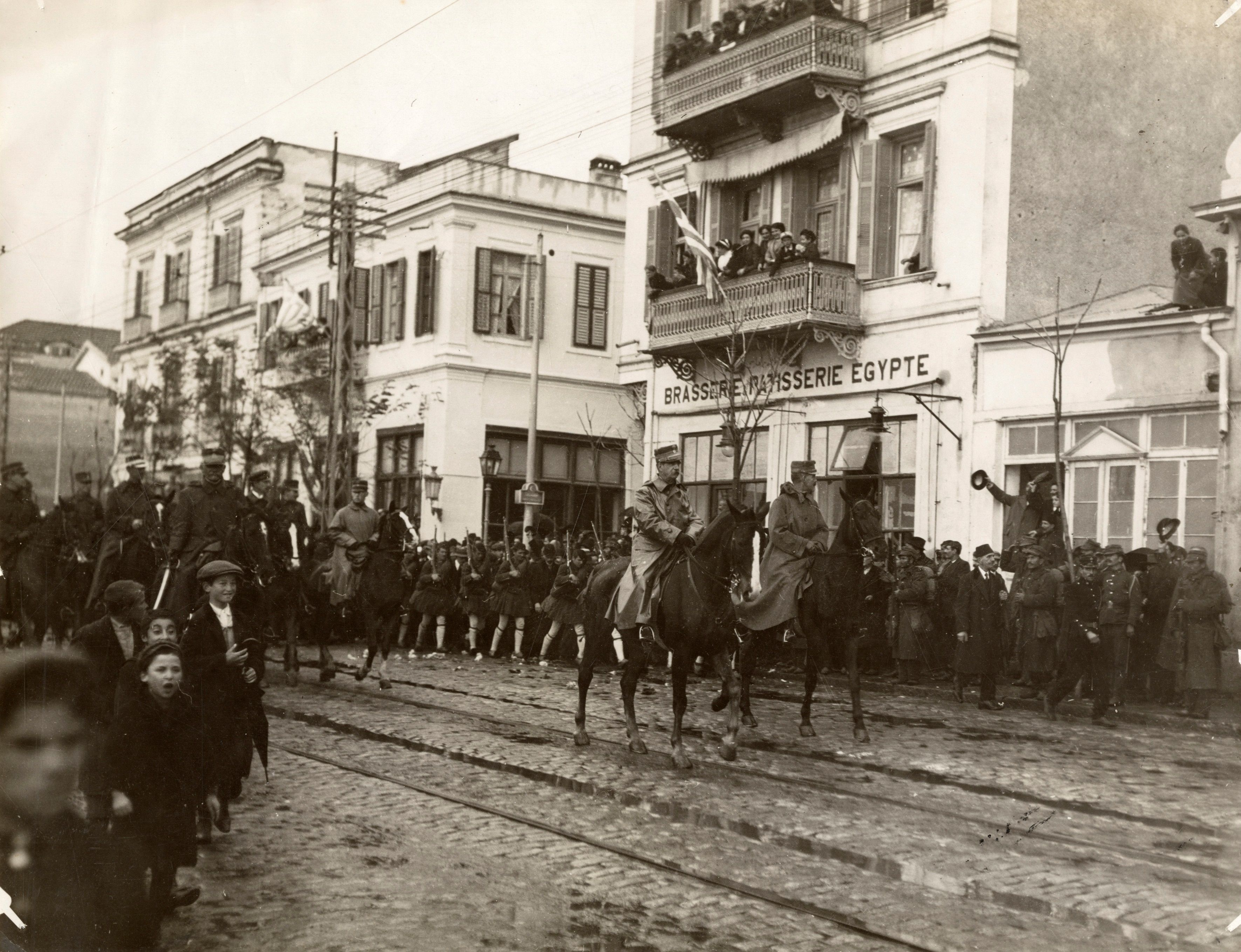
George I of Greece with Crown Prince Constantine and the Greek army enter the city

Thessaloniki was also the centre of activities of the Young Turks, a political reform movement, whose goal was to replace the Ottoman Empire's absolute monarchy with a constitutional government. The Young Turks started out as an underground movement, until finally in 1908, they started the Young Turk Revolution from the city of Thessaloniki, which led to them gaining control over the Ottoman Empire and put an end to the Ottoman sultan's power. Eleftherias (Liberty) Square, where the Young Turks gathered at the outbreak of the revolution, is named after the event. Turkey's first president Mustafa Kemal Atatürk, who was born and raised in Thessaloniki, was a member of the Young Turks in his soldier days and also partook in the Young Turk Revolution.

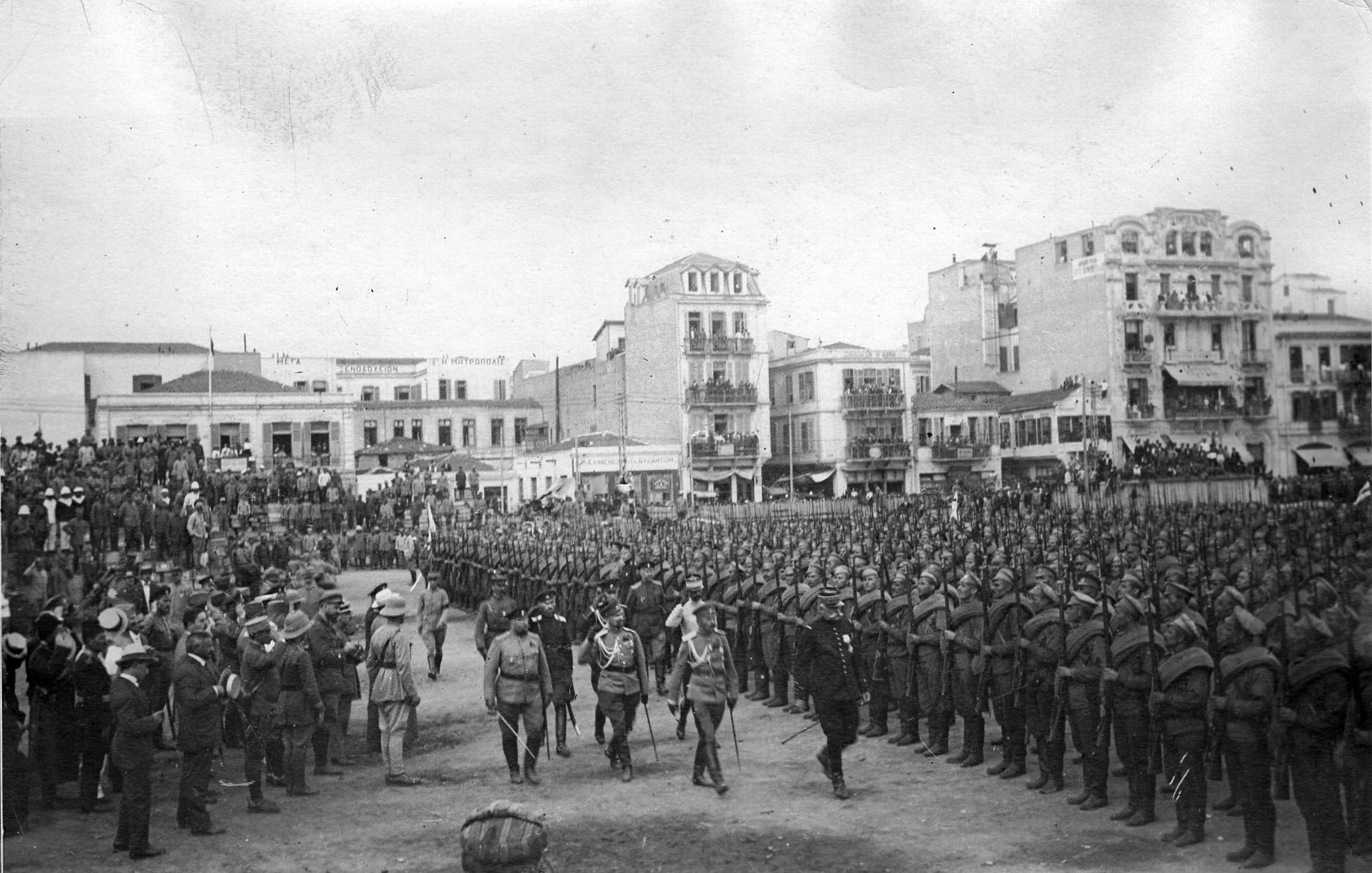
Allied armies in Thessaloniki, World War I

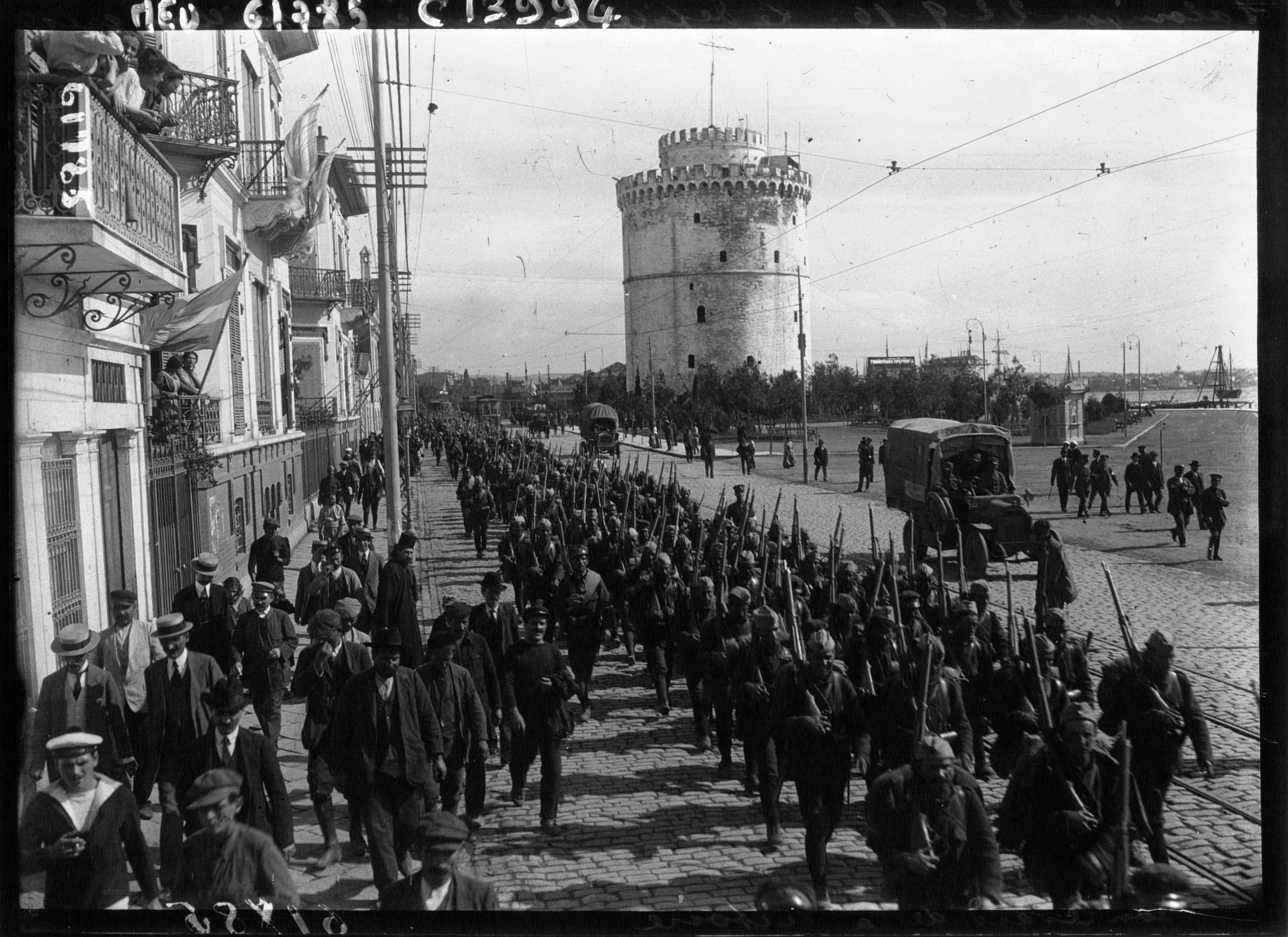
The 1st Battalion of the Army of National Defence marches on its way to the Macedonian front.

==== Balkan Wars and the end of Ottoman rule ====
As the First Balkan War broke out, Greece declared war on the Ottoman Empire and expanded its borders. When Eleftherios Venizelos, Prime Minister at the time, was asked if the Greek army should move towards Thessaloniki or Monastir (now Bitola, Republic of North Macedonia), Venizelos replied "Θεσσαλονίκη με κάθε κόστος!" (Thessaloniki, at all costs!). With the outnumbered Ottoman Army fighting a rearguard action against well-prepared Greek forces at Yenidje, Bulgarian troops advancing close by, and the Ottoman naval base at Thessaloniki blockaded by the Greek Navy, General Hasan Tahsin Pasha soon realised that it had become untenable to defend the city. The sinking of the Ottoman ironclad Feth-i Bülend in Thessaloniki harbour on 31 October [O.S. 18 October] 1912, although militarily negligible, further damaged Ottoman morale.

As both Greece and Bulgaria wanted Thessaloniki, the Ottoman garrison of the city entered into negotiations with both armies separately. Ultimately it was decided to hand over the city to the Greeks, in part because there was a perception on the Ottoman side that the Greek troops would be more lenient towards its residents. Negotiations between the Greek and Turkish delegations were concluded at the village of Topçin on the outskirts of the city. On 8 November 1912 (26 October Old Style), the feast day of the city's patron saint, Saint Demetrius, the Greek Army accepted the peaceful and unconditional surrender of the 25,000-strong Ottoman garrison at Thessaloniki, bringing almost five centuries of Ottoman rule to an end. The Bulgarian army arrived one day after the surrender of the city to Greece and Hasan Tahsin Pasha, commander of the city's defences, told the Bulgarian officials that "I have only one Thessaloniki, which I have surrendered".

After the Second Balkan War, Thessaloniki and the rest of the Greek portion of Macedonia were officially annexed to Greece by the Treaty of Bucharest in 1913. On 18 March 1913 George I of Greece was assassinated in the city by Alexandros Schinas.

==== World War I, the Great Fire, and population exchange ====
In 1915, during World War I, a large Allied expeditionary force established a base at Thessaloniki for operations against pro-German Bulgaria. This culminated in the establishment of the Macedonian Front, also known as the Salonika front, and a temporary hospital run by the Scottish Women's Hospitals for Foreign Service being set up in a disused factory. In 1916, pro-Venizelist Greek army officers and civilians, with the support of the Allies, launched an uprising, creating a pro-Allied temporary government by the name of the "Provisional Government of National Defence" that controlled the "New Lands" (lands that were gained by Greece in the Balkan Wars, most of Northern Greece including Greek Macedonia, the North Aegean as well as the island of Crete); the official government of the King in Athens, called in historiography as the "State of Athens", controlled "Old Greece" which was traditionally monarchist. The State of Thessaloniki was disestablished with the unification of the two opposing Greek governments under Venizelos, following the abdication of King Constantine in 1917.

On 30 December 1915 an Austrian air raid on Thessaloniki alarmed many town civilians and killed at least one person, and in response the Allied troops based there arrested the German, Austrian, Bulgarian and Turkish vice-consuls and their families and dependents and put them on a battleship, and billeted troops in their consulate buildings in Thessaloniki.

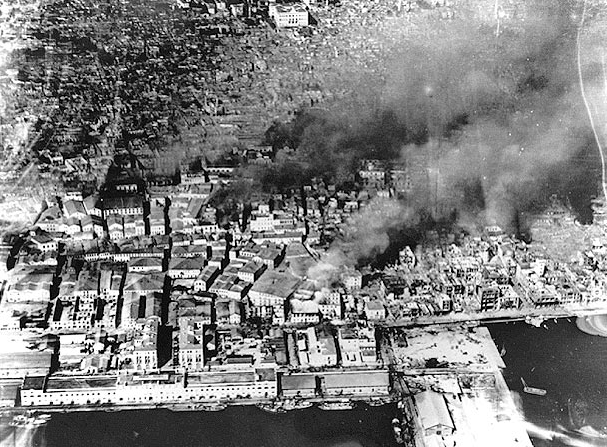
Aerial photograph of the Great Fire of 1917

Most of the old centre of the city was destroyed by the Great Thessaloniki Fire of 1917, which was started accidentally by an unattended kitchen fire on 18 August 1917. The fire swept through the centre of the city, leaving 72,000 people homeless; according to the Pallis Report, most of them were Jewish (50,000). Many businesses were destroyed, as a result, 70% of the population were unemployed. Two churches and many synagogues and mosques were lost. More than one quarter of the total population of approximately 271,157 became homeless. Following the fire the government prohibited quick rebuilding, so it could implement the new redesign of the city according to the European-style urban plan prepared by a group of architects, including the Briton Thomas Mawson, and headed by French architect Ernest Hébrard. Property values fell from 6.5 million Greek drachmas to 750,000.

After the defeat of Greece in the Greco-Turkish War and during the break-up of the Ottoman Empire, a population exchange took place between Greece and Turkey. Over 160,000 ethnic Greeks deported from the former Ottoman Empire – particularly Greeks from Asia Minor and East Thrace were resettled in the city, changing its demographics. Additionally many of the city's Muslims, including Ottoman Greek Muslims, were deported to Turkey, ranging at about 20,000 people. This made the Greek element dominant, while the Jewish population was reduced to a minority for the first time since the 16th century. This was part of an overall process of modern Hellenization, which affected nearly all minorities within Greece, turning the region into a hotspot of ethnic nationalism.

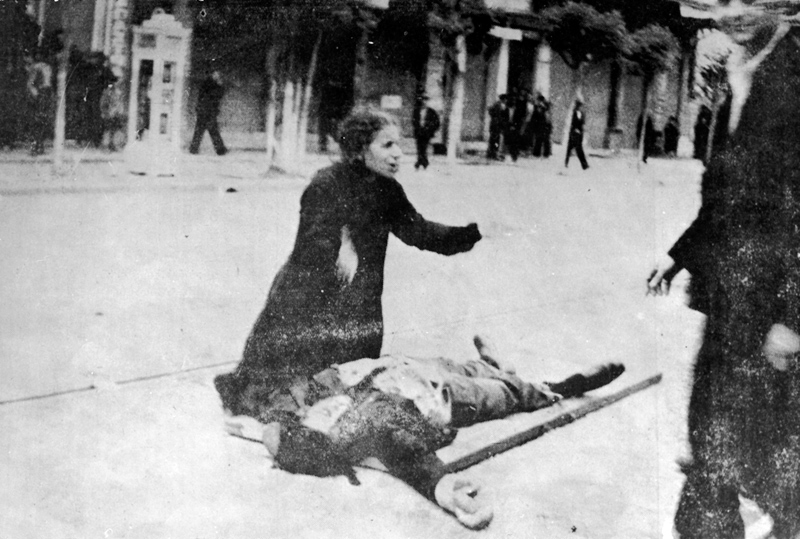
Dead protester during the tobacco strike in May 1936

In May 1936, a massive strike by tobacco workers led to general anarchy in the city and Ioannis Metaxas (future dictator, then PM) ordered its repression. The events and the deaths of the protesters inspired Yiannis Ritsos to write the Epitafios.

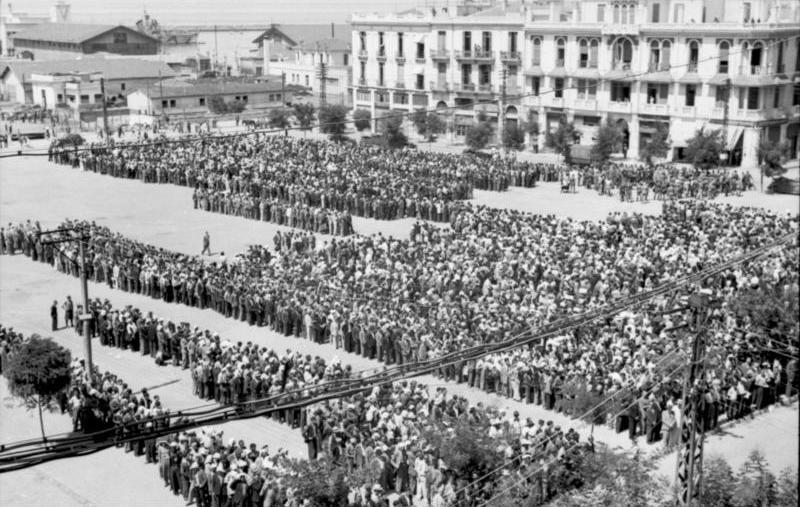
Registration of the male Jews of Thessaloniki in July 1942, Eleftherias Square. 96% of deported Jews perished in Nazi concentration camps.

==== World War II ====
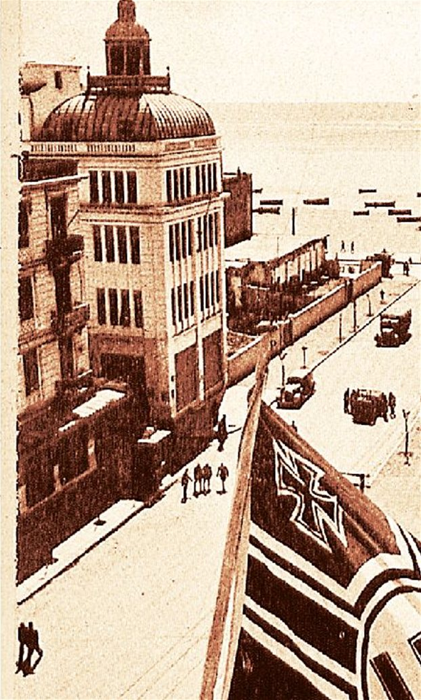
Part of Eleftherias Square and Stein mansion during the Axis occupation

During World War II Thessaloniki was heavily bombarded by Fascist Italy (with 232 people dead, 871 wounded and over 800 buildings damaged or destroyed in November 1940 alone), and, the Italians having failed in their invasion of Greece, it fell to the forces of Nazi Germany on 8 April 1941 and went under German occupation. The Nazis soon forced the Jewish residents into a ghetto near the railroads and on 15 March 1943 began the deportation of the city's Jews to Auschwitz and Bergen-Belsen concentration camps. Most were immediately murdered in the gas chambers. Of the 45,000 Jews deported to Auschwitz, only 4% survived.

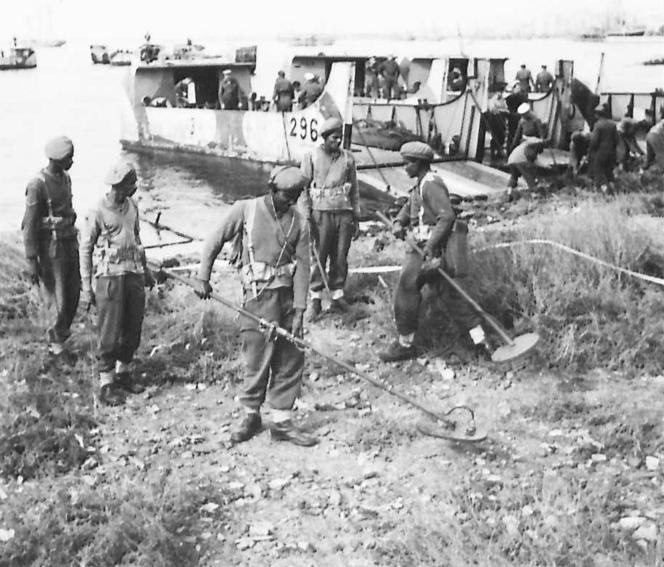
Indian troops sweep for mines in Salonika, 1944

Speaking in the Reichstag, Hitler claimed that the intention of his Balkan campaign was to prevent the Allies from establishing "a new Macedonian front", as they had during WWI. The importance of Thessaloniki to Nazi Germany can be demonstrated by the fact that, initially, Hitler had planned to incorporate it directly into Nazi Germany and not have it controlled by a puppet state such as the Hellenic State or an ally of Germany (Thessaloniki had been promised to Yugoslavia as a reward for joining the Axis on 25 March 1941).

As it was the first major city in Greece to fall to the occupying forces, the first Greek resistance group was formed in Thessaloniki (under the name Ελευθερία, Elefthería, "Freedom") as well as the first anti-Nazi newspaper in an occupied territory anywhere in Europe, also by the name Eleftheria. Thessaloniki was also home to a military camp-converted-concentration camp, known in German as "Konzentrationslager Pavlo Mela" (Pavlos Melas Concentration Camp), where members of the resistance and other anti-fascists were held either to be killed or sent to other concentration camps. In September 1943, the Germans established the Dulag 410 transit camp for Italian Military Internees in the city. On 30 October 1944, after battles with the retreating German army and the Security Battalions of Poulos, forces of ELAS entered Thessaloniki as liberators headed by Markos Vafiadis (who did not obey orders from ELAS leadership in Athens to not enter the city). Pro-EAM celebrations and demonstrations followed in the city. In the 1946 monarchy referendum, the majority of the locals voted in favor of a republic, contrary to the rest of Greece.

==== Post-war: contemporary Thessaloniki ====
After the war, Thessaloniki was rebuilt with large-scale development of new infrastructure and industry throughout the 1950s, 1960s and 1970s. Many of its architectural treasures still remain, adding value to the city as a tourist destination, while several early Christian and Byzantine monuments of Thessaloniki were added to the UNESCO World Heritage list in 1988. In 1997, Thessaloniki was celebrated as the European Capital of Culture, sponsoring events across the city and the region. Agency established to oversee the cultural activities of that year 1997 was still in existence by 2010. In 2004, the city hosted a number of the football events as part of the 2004 Summer Olympics.

Today, Thessaloniki has become one of the most important trade and business hubs in Southeastern Europe, with its port, the Port of Thessaloniki being one of the largest in the Aegean and facilitating trade throughout the Balkan hinterland. On 26 October 2012 the city celebrated its centennial since its incorporation into Greece. The city also forms one of the largest student centers in Southeastern Europe, is host to the largest student population in Greece and was the European Youth Capital in 2014. Infrastructure improvements came in the 2020s with the upgrade and expansion of Thessaloniki Airport in 2021 and the opening of Thessaloniki Metro in 2024.

== Geography ==
Thessaloniki is located 502 kilometres (312 mi) north of Athens.

Thessaloniki's urban area spreads over 30 kilometres (19 mi) from Oraiokastro in the north to Thermi in the south in the direction of Chalkidiki.

=== Geology ===
Thessaloniki lies on the northern fringe of the Thermaic Gulf on its eastern coast and is bound by Mount Chortiatis on its southeast. Its proximity to imposing mountain ranges, hills and fault lines, especially towards its southeast have historically made the city prone to geological changes.

Since medieval times, Thessaloniki has been hit by strong earthquakes, notably in 1759, 1902, 1978 and 1995. On 19–20 June 1978, the city suffered a series of powerful earthquakes, registering 5.5 and 6.5 on the Richter scale. The tremors caused considerable damage to a number of buildings and ancient monuments, but the city withstood the catastrophe without any major problems. One apartment building in central Thessaloniki collapsed during the second earthquake, killing many and raising the final death toll to 51.

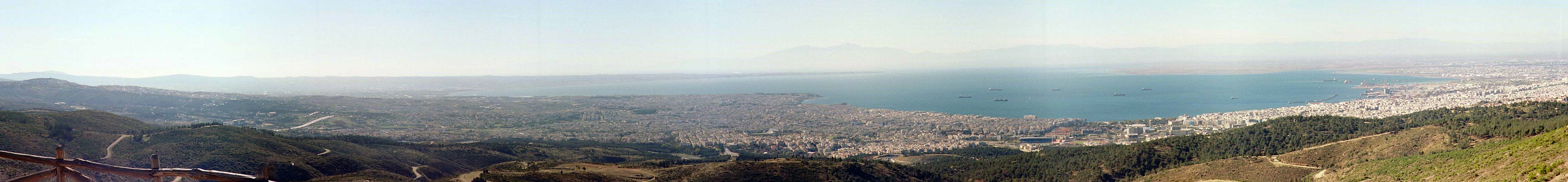
Panoramic view of the city from Kedrinos Lofos with Mount Olympus in the background

=== Climate ===
Thessaloniki's climate is transitional, lying on the periphery of multiple climate zones. According to the Köppen climate classification, the city generally has a cold semi-arid climate (BSk), bordering a hot semi-arid climate (BSh) in a small area of the center influenced by the urban heat island phenomenon. Mediterranean (Csa) and humid subtropical (Cfa) influences are also found in the city's climate. Like in Athens the Pindus mountain range greatly contributes to the generally dry climate of the area by substantially drying the westerly winds.

Winters are cool, somewhat dry with cold nights. Morning frost is common. Snowfalls occur more or less every winter, but the snow cover does not last for more than a few days. During the coldest winters, temperatures can drop to under −10 °C (14 °F). The record minimum temperature in Thessaloniki was −14 °C (7 °F). On average, Thessaloniki experiences frost (sub-zero temperature) 32 days a year, though that's less common near the city centre, owing to the urban heat island effect which characterizes the city and is more pronounced during the winter months. Foggy days occur sparsely, roughly 17 days a year, mainly in the autumn and winter months. The coldest month of the year in downtown Thessaloniki is January, with an average 24-hour temperature of 8 °C (46 °F). The city is also quite windy in the winter months, with January and February having an average wind speed of about 11 km/h (7 mph).

Thessaloniki's summers are hot and moderately dry. Maximum temperatures usually rise above 30 °C (86 °F), but they rarely exceed 40 °C (104 °F); while the average number of days the temperature is above 32 °C (90 °F) is 32. Generally, the sea breeze blowing from the Thermaic gulf helps moderate the city's temperatures. The maximum recorded temperature in the city was 44 °C (111 °F). Rain occasionally falls in the summer, mainly during thunderstorms, while heat waves occur sporadically, though few of them are intense. The hottest months of the year in downtown Thessaloniki are July and August, with an average 24-hour temperature of around 28.0 °C (82 °F).

In 2021, Greece was taken to task by the European Commission for failing to curb consistently high air pollution levels in Thessaloniki.

Climate data for Aristotle University of Thessaloniki, 32 m (105 ft) a.s.l., (1991–2020 normals, extremes 1930–present)
Month	Jan	Feb	Mar	Apr	May	Jun	Jul	Aug	Sep	Oct	Nov	Dec	Year
Record high °C (°F)	22.5 (72.5)	25.1 (77.2)	30.1 (86.2)	32.2 (90.0)	37.8 (100.0)	41.2 (106.2)	43.3 (109.9)	41.6 (106.9)	40.3 (104.5)	33.4 (92.1)	28.1 (82.6)	24.4 (75.9)	43.3 (109.9)
Mean daily maximum °C (°F)	10.6 (51.1)	12.4 (54.3)	15.6 (60.1)	19.7 (67.5)	25.2 (77.4)	30.0 (86.0)	32.3 (90.1)	32.3 (90.1)	27.8 (82.0)	22.1 (71.8)	16.6 (61.9)	11.8 (53.2)	21.4 (70.5)
Daily mean °C (°F)	7.0 (44.6)	8.4 (47.1)	11.2 (52.2)	14.9 (58.8)	20.0 (68.0)	24.7 (76.5)	27.0 (80.6)	27.1 (80.8)	22.7 (72.9)	17.7 (63.9)	12.8 (55.0)	8.3 (46.9)	16.8 (62.3)
Mean daily minimum °C (°F)	3.4 (38.1)	4.4 (39.9)	6.8 (44.2)	10.1 (50.2)	14.9 (58.8)	19.4 (66.9)	21.8 (71.2)	21.9 (71.4)	17.6 (63.7)	13.4 (56.1)	9.0 (48.2)	4.9 (40.8)	12.3 (54.1)
Record low °C (°F)	−12.6 (9.3)	−8.9 (16.0)	−8.2 (17.2)	−0.4 (31.3)	5.2 (41.4)	8.6 (47.5)	12.0 (53.6)	10.3 (50.5)	7.7 (45.9)	1.4 (34.5)	−2.8 (27.0)	−8.2 (17.2)	−12.6 (9.3)
Average precipitation mm (inches)	34.1 (1.34)	33.6 (1.32)	39.5 (1.56)	37.5 (1.48)	51.0 (2.01)	31.6 (1.24)	27.0 (1.06)	25.1 (0.99)	37.4 (1.47)	43.7 (1.72)	40.9 (1.61)	48.2 (1.90)	449.6 (17.7)
Source: Aristotle University of Thessaloniki, World Meteorological Organization

Climate data for Downtown Thessaloniki (2005–2025 averages and extremes)
Month	Jan	Feb	Mar	Apr	May	Jun	Jul	Aug	Sep	Oct	Nov	Dec	Year
Record high °C (°F)	20.9 (69.6)	22.5 (72.5)	25.5 (77.9)	29.7 (85.5)	33.2 (91.8)	40.5 (104.9)	40.8 (105.4)	40.4 (104.7)	35.7 (96.3)	30.8 (87.4)	27.0 (80.6)	24.7 (76.5)	40.8 (105.4)
Mean daily maximum °C (°F)	11.1 (52.0)	12.8 (55.0)	15.6 (60.1)	19.5 (67.1)	24.3 (75.7)	29.1 (84.4)	31.7 (89.1)	31.5 (88.7)	27.0 (80.6)	21.5 (70.7)	17.0 (62.6)	12.7 (54.9)	21.2 (70.1)
Daily mean °C (°F)	8.3 (46.9)	9.8 (49.6)	12.3 (54.1)	16.0 (60.8)	20.8 (69.4)	25.4 (77.7)	28.0 (82.4)	27.9 (82.2)	23.7 (74.7)	18.5 (65.3)	14.3 (57.7)	10.1 (50.2)	17.9 (64.3)
Mean daily minimum °C (°F)	5.5 (41.9)	6.8 (44.2)	9.1 (48.4)	12.6 (54.7)	17.2 (63.0)	21.7 (71.1)	24.3 (75.7)	24.3 (75.7)	20.3 (68.5)	15.5 (59.9)	11.6 (52.9)	7.4 (45.3)	14.7 (58.4)
Record low °C (°F)	−9.3 (15.3)	−4.2 (24.4)	−2.8 (27.0)	3.4 (38.1)	8.6 (47.5)	14.3 (57.7)	16.6 (61.9)	15.3 (59.5)	12.2 (54.0)	6.2 (43.2)	1.6 (34.9)	−2.0 (28.4)	−9.3 (15.3)
Average precipitation mm (inches)	31.1 (1.22)	26.9 (1.06)	40.5 (1.59)	30.3 (1.19)	41.6 (1.64)	42.8 (1.69)	21.7 (0.85)	20.6 (0.81)	33.5 (1.32)	36.6 (1.44)	31.6 (1.24)	41.9 (1.65)	399.1 (15.7)
Source: Meteothes Historical Centre Station (Mar 2005 – Dec 2025)

Climate data for Thessaloniki Airport 2 m asl, 1991–2020 normals (precipitation 1971–2000), (extremes 1961–present)
Month	Jan	Feb	Mar	Apr	May	Jun	Jul	Aug	Sep	Oct	Nov	Dec	Year
Record high °C (°F)	23.0 (73.4)	24.0 (75.2)	31.6 (88.9)	31.2 (88.2)	36.0 (96.8)	41.4 (106.5)	44.0 (111.2)	40.5 (104.9)	37.3 (99.1)	32.2 (90.0)	27.0 (80.6)	24.0 (75.2)	44.0 (111.2)
Mean daily maximum °C (°F)	9.4 (48.9)	11.1 (52.0)	14.7 (58.5)	19.3 (66.7)	24.8 (76.6)	29.9 (85.8)	32.2 (90.0)	32.1 (89.8)	27.2 (81.0)	21.4 (70.5)	15.6 (60.1)	10.7 (51.3)	20.7 (69.3)
Daily mean °C (°F)	5.7 (42.3)	7.1 (44.8)	10.1 (50.2)	14.1 (57.4)	19.3 (66.7)	24.2 (75.6)	26.5 (79.7)	26.5 (79.7)	22.0 (71.6)	16.9 (62.4)	11.8 (53.2)	7.2 (45.0)	16.0 (60.7)
Mean daily minimum °C (°F)	2.2 (36.0)	3.3 (37.9)	5.6 (42.1)	8.8 (47.8)	13.8 (56.8)	18.6 (65.5)	20.9 (69.6)	20.8 (69.4)	16.8 (62.2)	12.6 (54.7)	8.2 (46.8)	3.9 (39.0)	11.3 (52.3)
Record low °C (°F)	−14.2 (6.4)	−12.8 (9.0)	−7.2 (19.0)	−2.0 (28.4)	2.8 (37.0)	6.8 (44.2)	9.6 (49.3)	8.2 (46.8)	2.8 (37.0)	−1.4 (29.5)	−6.2 (20.8)	−9.8 (14.4)	−14.2 (6.4)
Average precipitation mm (inches)	32.5 (1.28)	38.8 (1.53)	37.6 (1.48)	38.4 (1.51)	40.3 (1.59)	27.5 (1.08)	22.3 (0.88)	22.4 (0.88)	25.2 (0.99)	43.8 (1.72)	60.2 (2.37)	46.5 (1.83)	435.5 (17.14)
Average precipitation days	11.5	10.7	12.1	11.1	11.0	7.9	6.7	5.1	7.0	9.3	11.8	12.7	116.9
Average relative humidity (%)	75.7	72.0	71	67.3	63.0	55.4	52.7	55.0	61.9	70.4	76.3	77.9	66.5
Mean monthly sunshine hours	98.7	102.6	147.2	202.6	252.7	296.4	325.7	295.8	229.9	165.5	117.8	102.6	2,337.5
Source: Info Climat climate normals & extremes, HNMS precipitation & humidity, NOAA Sunshine hours & extremes

Climate data for Thessaloniki International Fair, 29 m (95 ft) a.s.l.
Month	Jan	Feb	Mar	Apr	May	Jun	Jul	Aug	Sep	Oct	Nov	Dec	Year
Record high °C (°F)	21.3 (70.3)	21.4 (70.5)	23.9 (75.0)	30.5 (86.9)	32.8 (91.0)	37.8 (100.0)	40.4 (104.7)	40.8 (105.4)	33.2 (91.8)	30.3 (86.5)	26.3 (79.3)	20.8 (69.4)	40.8 (105.4)
Mean daily maximum °C (°F)	11.5 (52.7)	14.0 (57.2)	15.7 (60.3)	19.7 (67.5)	24.6 (76.3)	30.3 (86.5)	32.7 (90.9)	32.5 (90.5)	27.8 (82.0)	22.9 (73.2)	17.6 (63.7)	12.9 (55.2)	21.8 (71.3)
Daily mean °C (°F)	8.3 (46.9)	10.2 (50.4)	11.9 (53.4)	15.6 (60.1)	20.5 (68.9)	26.0 (78.8)	28.7 (83.7)	28.5 (83.3)	24.1 (75.4)	19.2 (66.6)	14.4 (57.9)	10.1 (50.2)	18.1 (64.6)
Mean daily minimum °C (°F)	5.0 (41.0)	6.3 (43.3)	8.0 (46.4)	11.4 (52.5)	16.4 (61.5)	21.7 (71.1)	24.6 (76.3)	24.5 (76.1)	20.3 (68.5)	15.4 (59.7)	11.2 (52.2)	7.2 (45.0)	14.3 (57.8)
Record low °C (°F)	−4.6 (23.7)	−4.0 (24.8)	−0.2 (31.6)	2.9 (37.2)	9.9 (49.8)	15.3 (59.5)	17.2 (63.0)	19.2 (66.6)	12.4 (54.3)	8.9 (48.0)	3.2 (37.8)	−0.2 (31.6)	−4.6 (23.7)
Average rainfall mm (inches)	36.6 (1.44)	16.1 (0.63)	41.5 (1.63)	43.6 (1.72)	27.3 (1.07)	55.5 (2.19)	19.1 (0.75)	17.3 (0.68)	26.4 (1.04)	20.7 (0.81)	30.5 (1.20)	49.6 (1.95)	384.2 (15.11)
Source 1: National Observatory of Athens Monthly Bulletins (Sep 2018 – Jan 2025)
Source 2: Thessaloniki International Fair N.O.A station and World Meteorological Organization

Climate data for Kalamaria 2009–2019
Month	Jan	Feb	Mar	Apr	May	Jun	Jul	Aug	Sep	Oct	Nov	Dec	Year
Mean daily maximum °C (°F)	9.7 (49.5)	12.6 (54.7)	15.5 (59.9)	20.4 (68.7)	25.7 (78.3)	30.2 (86.4)	32.3 (90.1)	32.3 (90.1)	27.7 (81.9)	21.9 (71.4)	16.9 (62.4)	11.3 (52.3)	21.4 (70.5)
Daily mean °C (°F)	6.5 (43.7)	9.1 (48.4)	11.3 (52.3)	15.4 (59.7)	20.4 (68.7)	24.9 (76.8)	27.2 (81.0)	27.3 (81.1)	23.0 (73.4)	17.8 (64.0)	13.6 (56.5)	8.1 (46.6)	17.1 (62.7)
Mean daily minimum °C (°F)	3.8 (38.8)	6.2 (43.2)	8.0 (46.4)	11.3 (52.3)	16.1 (61.0)	20.5 (68.9)	22.8 (73.0)	22.9 (73.2)	19.1 (66.4)	14.6 (58.3)	11.0 (51.8)	5.3 (41.5)	13.5 (56.2)
Average precipitation mm (inches)	30 (1.2)	39 (1.5)	49 (1.9)	28 (1.1)	32 (1.3)	36 (1.4)	32 (1.3)	17 (0.7)	37 (1.5)	33 (1.3)	38 (1.5)	37 (1.5)	408 (16.2)
Source: National Observatory of Athens

== Government ==
Thessaloniki's urban and metropolitan areas as of 2011

According to the Kallikratis reform, as of 1 January 2011 the Thessaloniki Urban Area (Greek: Πολεοδομικό Συγκρότημα Θεσσαλονίκης) which makes up the "City of Thessaloniki", is made up of six self-governing municipalities (Greek: Δήμοι) and one municipal unit (Greek: Δημοτική ενότητα). The municipalities that are included in the Thessaloniki Urban Area are those of Thessaloniki (the city centre and largest in population size), Kalamaria, Neapoli-Sykies, Pavlos Melas, Kordelio-Evosmos, Ampelokipoi-Menemeni, and the municipal units of Pylaia and Panorama, part of the municipality of Pylaia-Chortiatis. Prior to the Kallikratis reform, the Thessaloniki Urban Area was made up of twice as many municipalities, considerably smaller in size, which created bureaucratic problems.

=== Thessaloniki Municipality ===
The municipality of Thessaloniki (Greek: Δήμος Θεσαλονίκης) is the second most populous in Greece, after Athens, with a resident population of 317,778 (in 2021) and an area of 19.307 square kilometres (7.454 square miles). The municipality forms the core of the Thessaloniki Urban Area, with its central district (the city centre), referred to as the Kentro, meaning 'centre' or 'downtown'. The municipal flag of Thessaloniki includes a stylized depiction of the city's main landmark, the White Tower, and an ancient Macedonian coin depicting Alexander the Great, who is also depicted in its seal and logo.

The city's first mayor, Osman Sait Bey, was appointed when the institution of mayor was inaugurated under the Ottoman Empire in 1912. The incumbent mayor is Stelios Angeloudis. In 2011, the municipality of Thessaloniki had a budget of €464.33 million while the budget of 2012 stands at €409.00 million.

=== Other ===
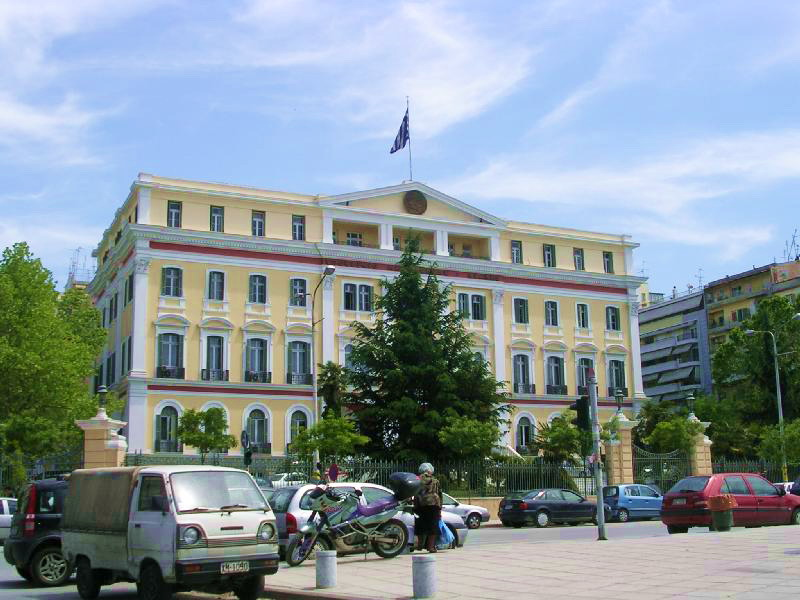
The Government House, now the Ministry for Macedonia and Thrace, designed by Vitaliano Poselli in 1891

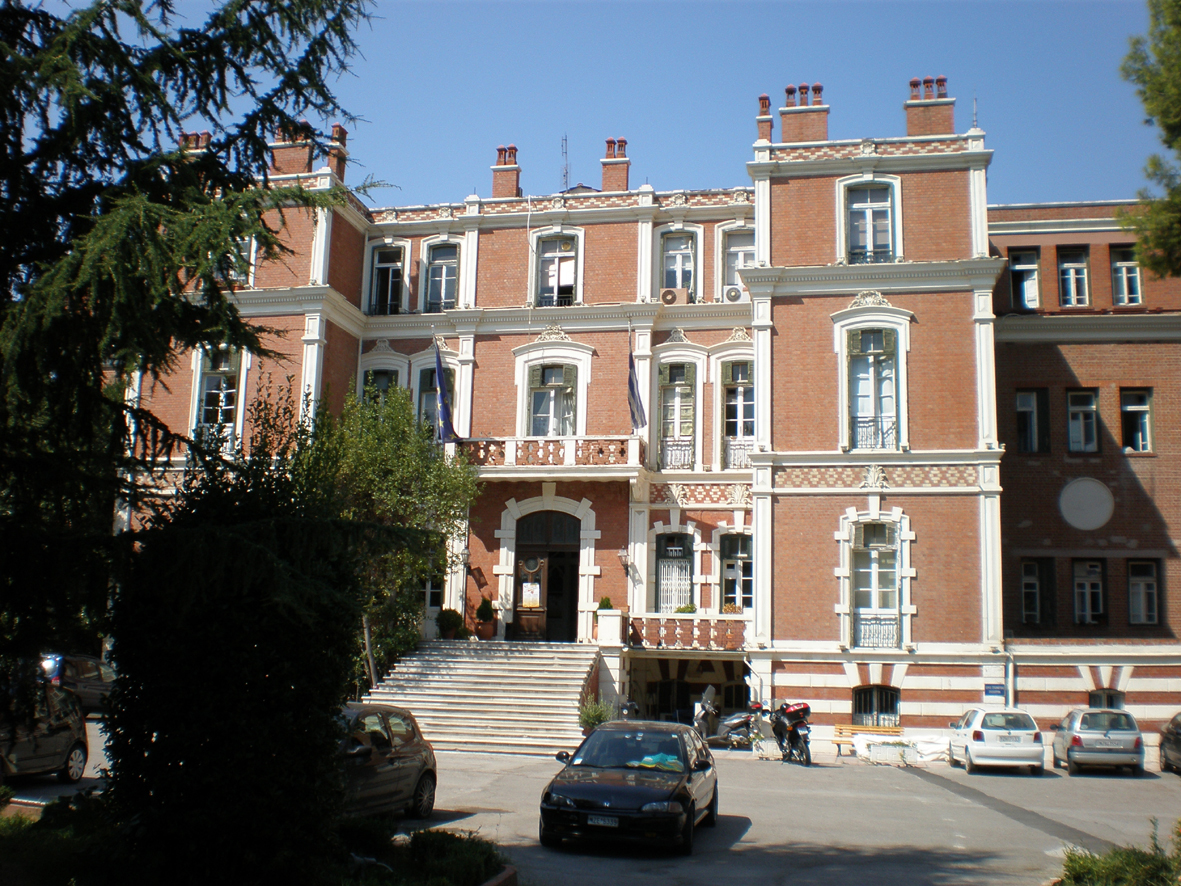
The Prefecture building (Villa Allatini)

Thessaloniki is the second largest city in Greece. It is an influential city for the northern parts of the country and is the capital of the region of Central Macedonia and the Thessaloniki regional unit. The Ministry of Macedonia and Thrace is also based in Thessaloniki, since the city is the de facto capital of the Greek region of Macedonia.

It is customary every year for the Prime Minister of Greece to announce his administration's policies on a number of issues, such as the economy, at the opening night of the Thessaloniki International Fair. In 2010, during the first months of the 2010 Greek debt crisis, the entire cabinet of Greece met in Thessaloniki to discuss the country's future.

In the Hellenic Parliament, the Thessaloniki urban area constitutes a 17-seat constituency. As of the June 2023 Greek legislative election the largest party in Thessaloniki is the New Democracy with 35.28% of the vote, followed by Syriza (17.52%). The table below summarizes the results of the latest elections.

June 2023 election results for Thessaloniki A
Party	Votes	%	Shift	MPs (17)	Change
New Democracy	102,449	35.28%	▲1.13%	8 / 17 (47%)	▼1
Syriza	50,877	17.52%	▼2.18%	3 / 17 (18%)	▼1
Communist Party of Greece	23,732	8.17%	▲0.73%	1 / 17 (6%)	0
PASOK – KINAL	23,638	8.14%	▲0.20%	1 / 16 (6%)	0
Greek Solution	23,143	7.97%	▼0.38%	1 / 16 (6%)	▼1
Victory	15,567	5.36%	▲0.78%	1 / 16 (6%)	▲1
Spartans	14,592	5.03%	▲5.03%	1 / 16 (6%)	▲1
Course of Freedom	12,893	4.44%	▼0.08%	1 / 16 (6%)	▲1
Other parties (unrepresented)	23,493	8.09%	▼14.33%		0

== Cityscape ==
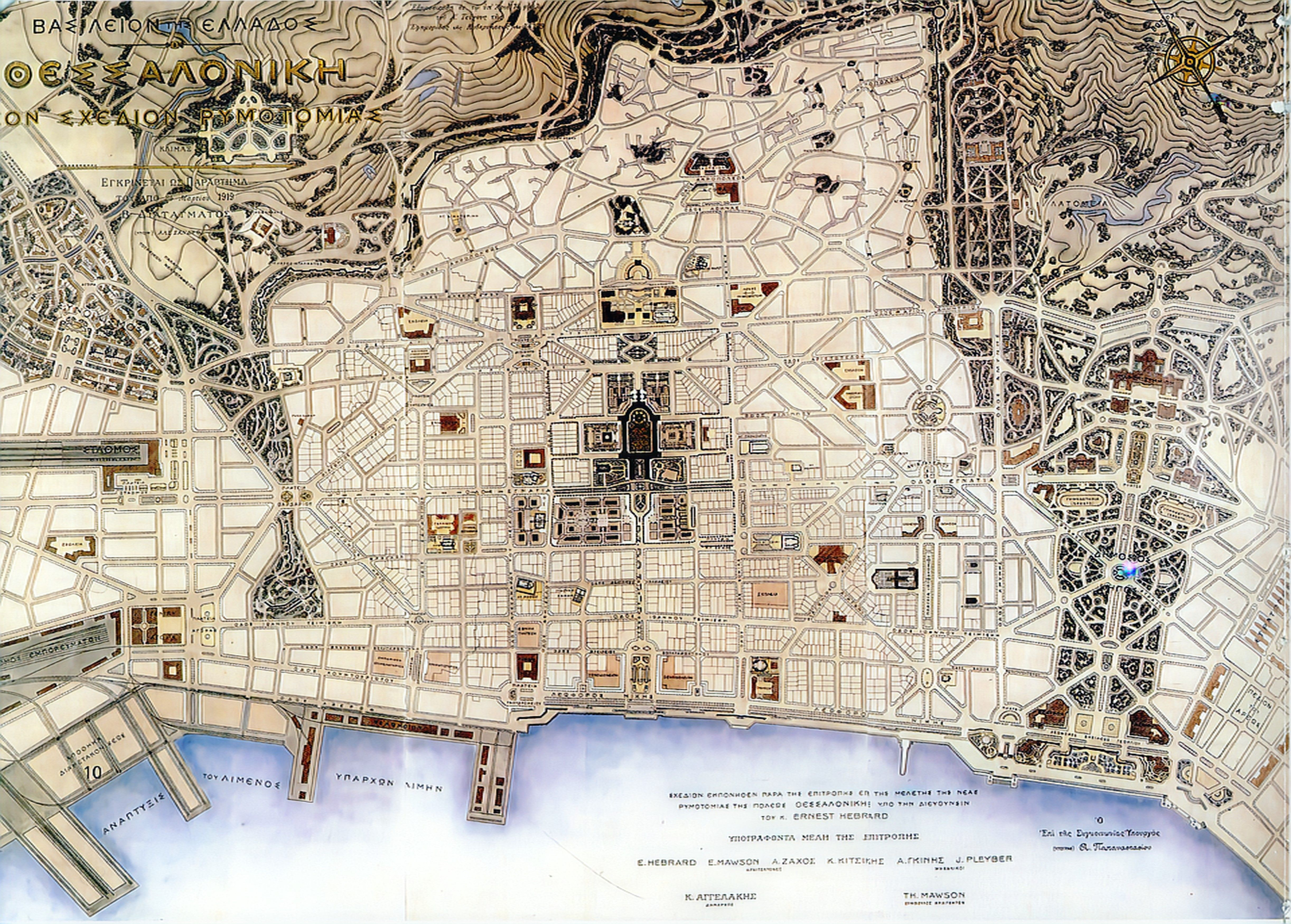
Plan for central Thessaloniki by Ernest Hébrard. Much of the plan can be seen in today's city centre.

=== Architecture ===
Architecture in Thessaloniki is the direct result of the city's position at the centre of all historical developments in the Balkans. Aside from its commercial importance, Thessaloniki was also for many centuries the military and administrative hub of the region, and beyond this the transportation link between Europe and the Levant. Merchants, traders and refugees from all over Europe settled in the city. The need for commercial and public buildings in this new era of prosperity led to the construction of large edifices in the city centre. During this time, the city saw the building of banks, large hotels, theatres, warehouses, and factories. Architects who designed some of the most notable buildings of the city, in the late 19th and early 20th century, include Vitaliano Poselli, Pietro Arrigoni, Xenophon Paionidis, Salvatore Poselli, Leonardo Gennari, Eli Modiano, Jacques Moshé, Joseph Pleyber, Ernst Ziller, Max Rubens, Filimon Paionidis, Angelos Siagas, Alexandros Tzonis and more, using mainly the styles of Eclecticism, Art Nouveau and Neobaroque.

The city layout changed after 1870, when the seaside fortifications gave way to extensive piers, and many of the oldest walls of the city were demolished, including those surrounding the White Tower, which today stands as the main landmark of the city. As parts of the early Byzantine walls were demolished, this allowed the city to expand east and west along the coast.

The expansion of Eleftherias Square towards the sea completed the new commercial hub of the city and at the time was considered one of the most vibrant squares of the city. As the city grew, workers moved to the western districts, because of their proximity to factories and industrial activities; while the middle and upper classes gradually moved from the city-centre to the eastern suburbs, leaving mainly businesses. In 1917, a devastating fire swept through the city and burned uncontrollably for 32 hours. It destroyed the city's historic centre and a large part of its architectural heritage, but paved the way for modern development featuring wider diagonal avenues and monumental squares.

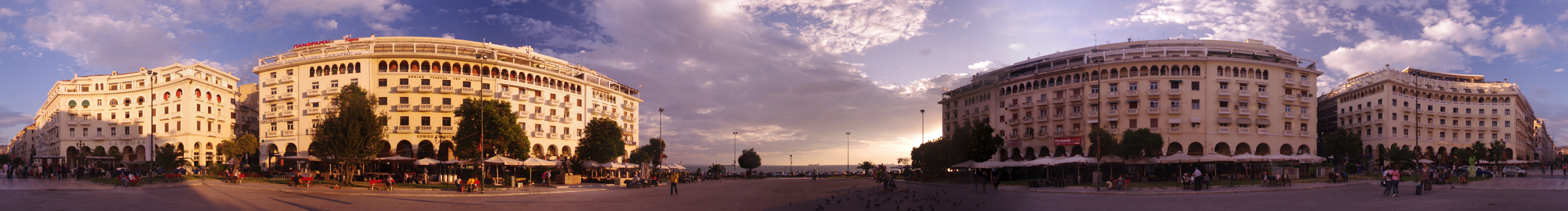
Panoramic view of Aristotelous Square, one of Thessaloniki's most recognizable areas, which was designed by Ernest Hébrard

=== City centre ===
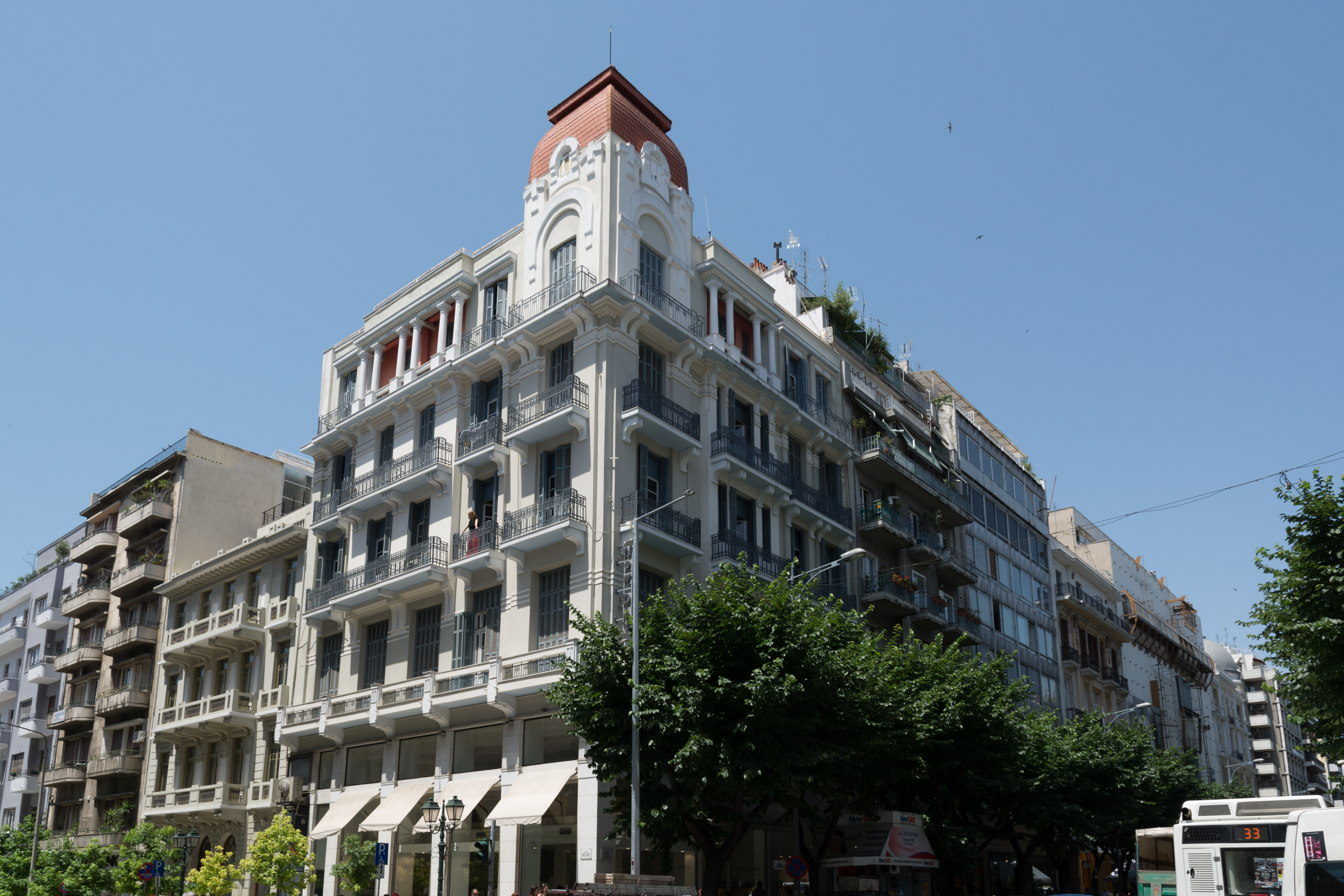
The old Hotel Astoria on Tsimiski Street, typical beaux-arts architecture of the post-fire architecture boom

After the Great Thessaloniki Fire of 1917, a team of architects and urban planners including Thomas Mawson and Ernest Hebrard, a French architect, chose the Byzantine era as the basis of their (re)building designs for Thessaloniki's city centre. The new city plan included axes, diagonal streets and monumental squares, with a street grid that would channel traffic smoothly. The plan of 1917 included provisions for future population expansions and a street and road network that would be, and still is sufficient today. It contained sites for public buildings and provided for the restoration of Byzantine churches and Ottoman mosques.

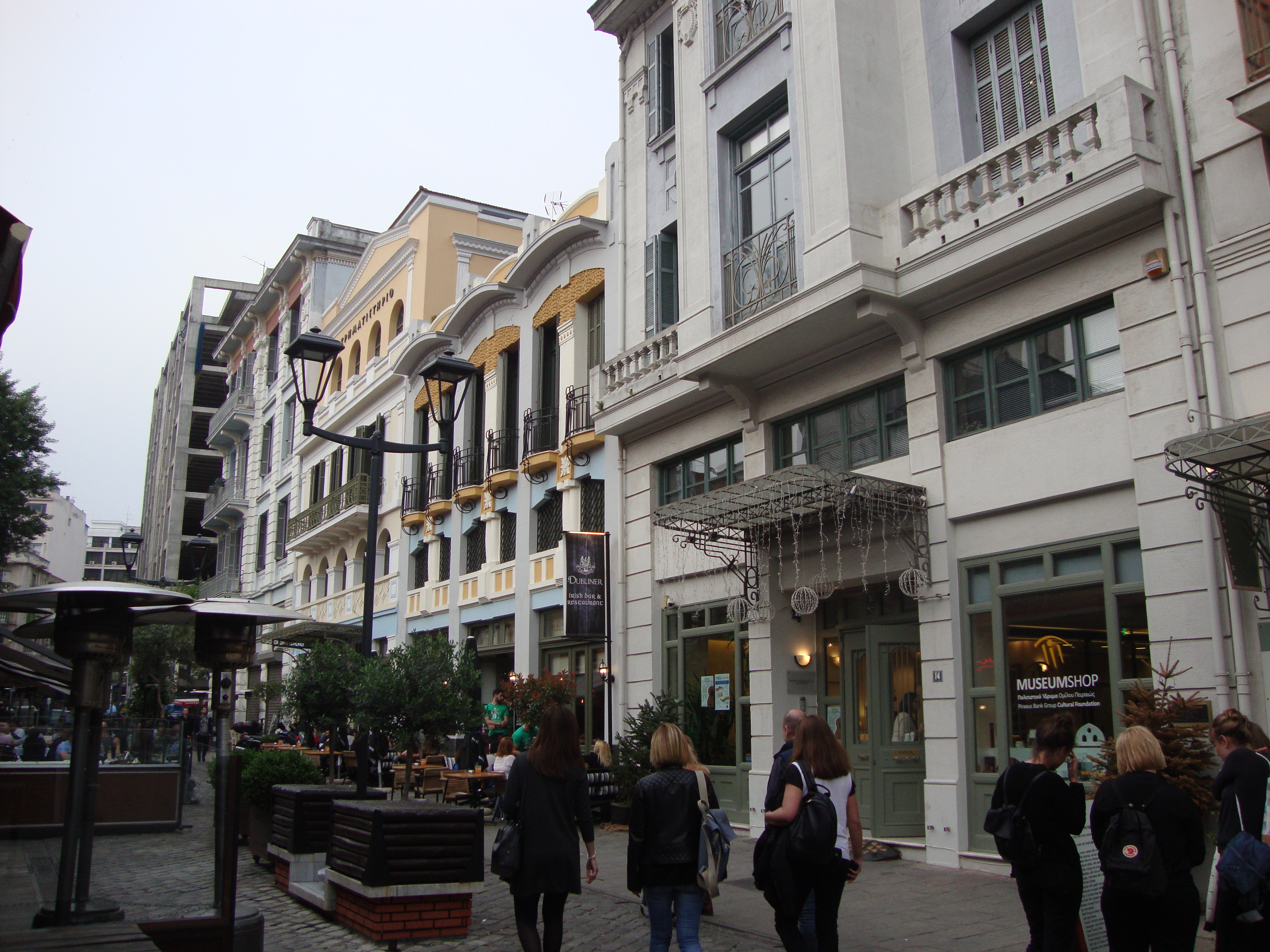
A street in Ladadika district

Also called the historic centre, it is divided into several districts, including Dimokratias Square (Democracy Sq. known also as Vardaris) Ladadika (where many entertainment venues and tavernas are located), Kapani (where the city's central Modiano market is located), Diagonios, Navarinou, Rotonda, Agia Sofia and Hippodromio, which are all located around Thessaloniki's most central point, Aristotelous Square.

Various commercial stoas around Aristotelous are named from the city's past and historic personalities of the city, like stoa Hirsch, stoa Carasso/Ermou, Pelosov, Colombou, Levi, Modiano, Morpurgo, Mordoch, Simcha, Kastoria, Malakopi, Olympios, Emboron, Rogoti, Vyzantio, Tatti, Agiou Mina, Karipi etc.

The western portion of the city centre is home to Thessaloniki's law courts, its central international railway station and the port, while its eastern side hosts the city's two universities, the Thessaloniki International Exhibition Centre, the city's main stadium, its archaeological and Byzantine museums, the new city hall and its central parks and gardens, namely those of the ΧΑΝΘ and Pedion tou Areos.

=== Ano Poli ===
Ano Poli (also called Old Town and literally the Upper Town) is the heritage-listed district north of Thessaloniki's city centre that was not engulfed by the great fire of 1917 and was declared a UNESCO World Heritage Site through the ministerial actions of Melina Merkouri, during the 1980s. It is the most traditional part of the city, still featuring small stone-paved streets, old squares and homes featuring old Greek and Ottoman architecture. It is the favourite area of Thessaloniki's poets, intellectuals and bohemians.

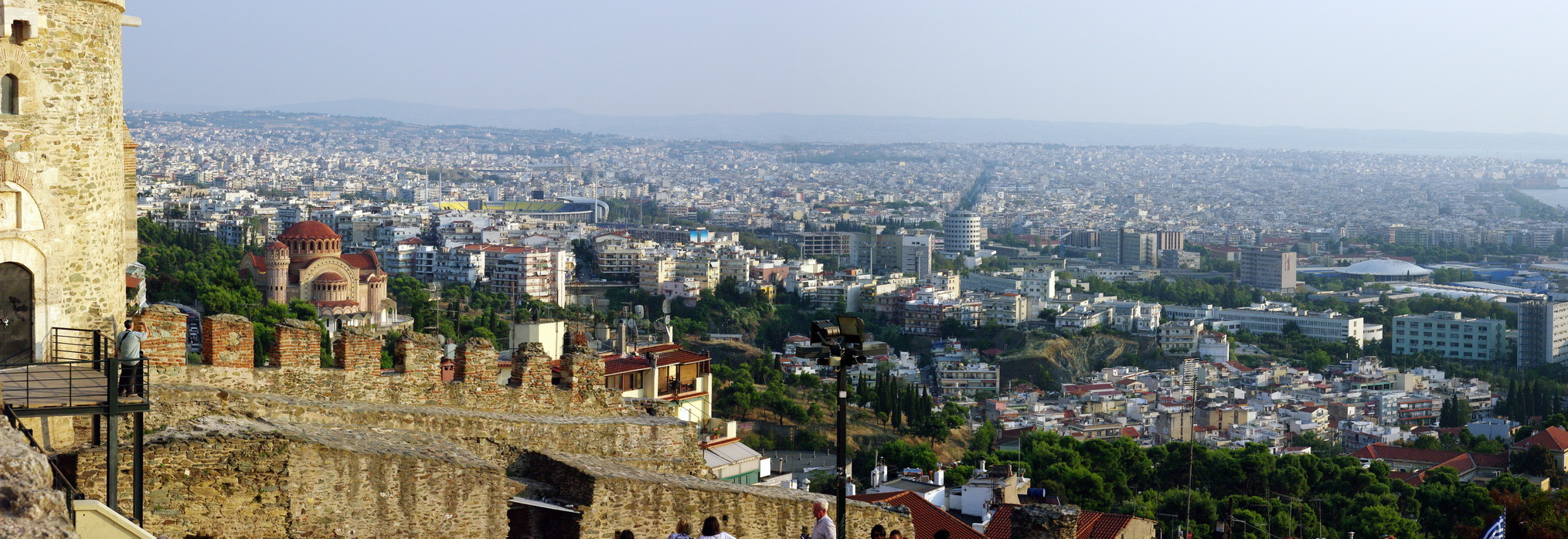
Panorama of the city from Ano Poli

Ano Poli is also the highest point in Thessaloniki and as such, is the location of the city's acropolis, its Byzantine fort, the Heptapyrgion, a large portion of the city's remaining walls, and with many of its additional Ottoman and Byzantine structures still standing. With the capture of Thessaloniki by the Ottomans in 1430, after a lengthy siege of the city from 1422 to 1430, the Ottomans settled in Ano Poli. This geographical choice was attributed to the higher level of Ano Poli, which was convenient to control the rest of the population remotely, and the microclimate of the area, which favoured better living conditions in terms of hygiene compared to the areas of the centre.

Today, the area provides access to the Seich Sou Forest National Park and features panoramic views of the whole city and the Thermaic Gulf. On clear days Mount Olympus, at about 100 km (62 mi) away across the gulf, can also be seen towering the horizon.

=== Other districts of Thessaloniki Municipality ===
In the Municipality of Thessaloniki, in addition to the historic centre and the Upper Town, are included the following districts: Xirokrini, Dikastiria (Courts), Ichthioskala, Palaios Stathmos, Lachanokipoi, Behtsinari, Panagia Faneromeni, Doxa, Saranta Ekklisies, Evangelistria, Triandria, Agia Triada-Faliro, Ippokrateio, Charilaou, Analipsi, Depot and Toumba.

In the area of the Old Railway Station (Palaios Stathmos) began the construction of the Holocaust Museum of Greece. In this area are located the Railway Museum of Thessaloniki, the Water Supply Museum and large entertainment venues of the city, such as Milos, Fix, Vilka (which are housed in converted old factories). The Thessaloniki railway station is located on Monastiriou street.

Other extended and densely built-up residential areas are Charilaou and Toumba, which is divided into "Ano Toumpa" and "Kato Toumpa". Toumba was named after the homonymous hill of Toumba, where extensive archaeological research takes place. It was created by refugees after the 1922 Asia Minor disaster and the population exchange (1923–24). On Exochon avenue (Rue des Campagnes, today Vasilissis Olgas and Vasileos Georgiou Avenues), was up until the 1920s home to the city's most affluent residents and formed the outermost suburbs of the city at the time, with the area close to the Thermaic Gulf, from the 19th-century holiday villas which defined the area.

=== Thessaloniki urban area ===
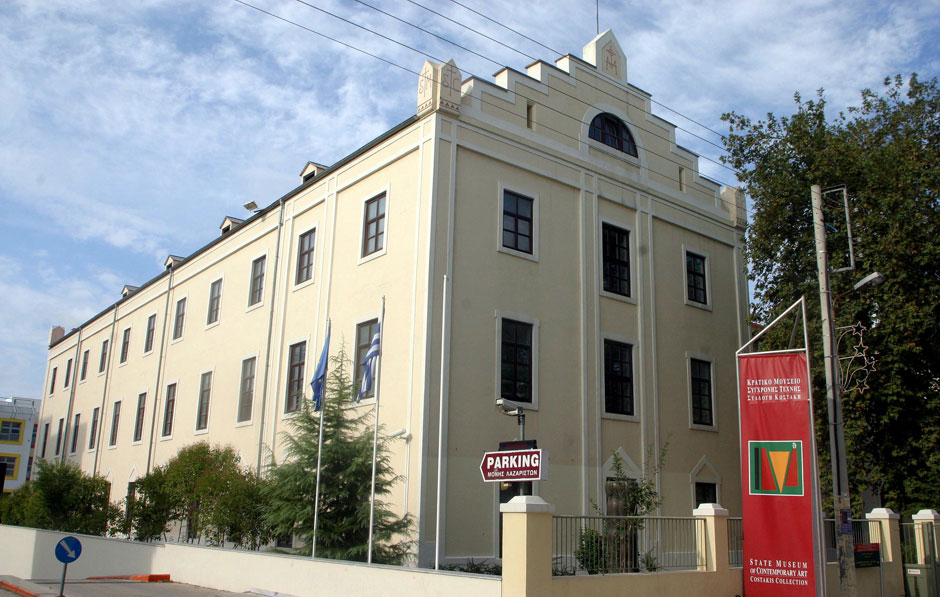
The cultural centre (including MOMus–Museum of Modern Art–Costakis Collection and two theatres of the National Theatre of Northern Greece), former Catholic Lazarist Monastery (Moni Lazariston)

Other districts of the wider urban area of Thessaloniki are Ampelokipi, Eleftherio – Kordelio, Menemeni, Evosmos, Ilioupoli, Stavroupoli, Nikopoli, Neapoli, Polichni, Paeglos, Meteora, Agios Pavlos, Kalamaria, Pylaia and the Sykies. Northwestern Thessaloniki is home to Moni Lazariston, located in Stavroupoli, which today forms one of the most important cultural centres for the city, including MOMus–Museum of Modern Art–Costakis Collection and two theatres of the National Theatre of Northern Greece.

In northwestern Thessaloniki many cultural premises exist, such as the open-air Theater Manos Katrakis in Sykies, the Museum of Refugee Hellenism in Neapolis, the municipal theatre and the open-air theatre in Neapoli and the New Cultural Centre of Menemeni (Ellis Alexiou Street). The Stavroupolis Botanical Garden on Perikleous Street includes 1,000 species of plants and is a 5-acre (2.0 ha) oasis of greenery. The Environmental Education Centre in Kordelio was designed in 1997 and is one of a few public buildings of bioclimatic design in Thessaloniki.

Northwest Thessaloniki forms the main entry point into the city of Thessaloniki with the avenues of Monastiriou, Miki Theodoraki and 26is Octovriou passing through it, as well as the extension of the A1 motorway, feeding into Thessaloniki's city centre. The area is home to the Macedonia InterCity Bus Terminal (KTEL), the Thessaloniki railway station, and the Zeitenlik Allied memorial military cemetery.

Monuments have also been erected in honour of the fighters of the Greek Resistance, as in these areas the Resistance was very active: the monument of Greek National Resistance in Sykies, the monument of Greek National Resistance in Stavroupolis, the Statue of the struggling Mother in Eptalofos Square and the monument of the young Greeks who were executed by the Nazis on 11 May 1944 in Xirokrini. In Eptalofos, on 15 May 1941, one month after the occupation of the country, the first resistance organization in Greece, "Eleftheria", was founded, with its newspaper and the first illegal printing house in the city of Thessaloniki.

Today southeastern Thessaloniki has in some way become an extension of the city centre, with the avenues of Megalou Alexandrou, Georgiou Papandreou (Antheon), Vasileos Georgiou, Vasilissis Olgas, Delfon, Konstantinou Karamanli (Nea Egnatia) and Papanastasiou passing through it, enclosing an area traditionally called Ντεπώ (Depó, lit. Dépôt), from the name of the old tram station, owned by a French company.

The municipality of Kalamaria is also located in southeastern Thessaloniki and was firstly, inhabited mainly by Greek refugees from Asia Minor and East Thrace after 1922. There are built the Northern Greece Naval Command and the old royal palace (called Palataki), located on the most westerly point of Mikro Emvolo cape.

=== Paleochristian and Byzantine monuments (UNESCO) ===
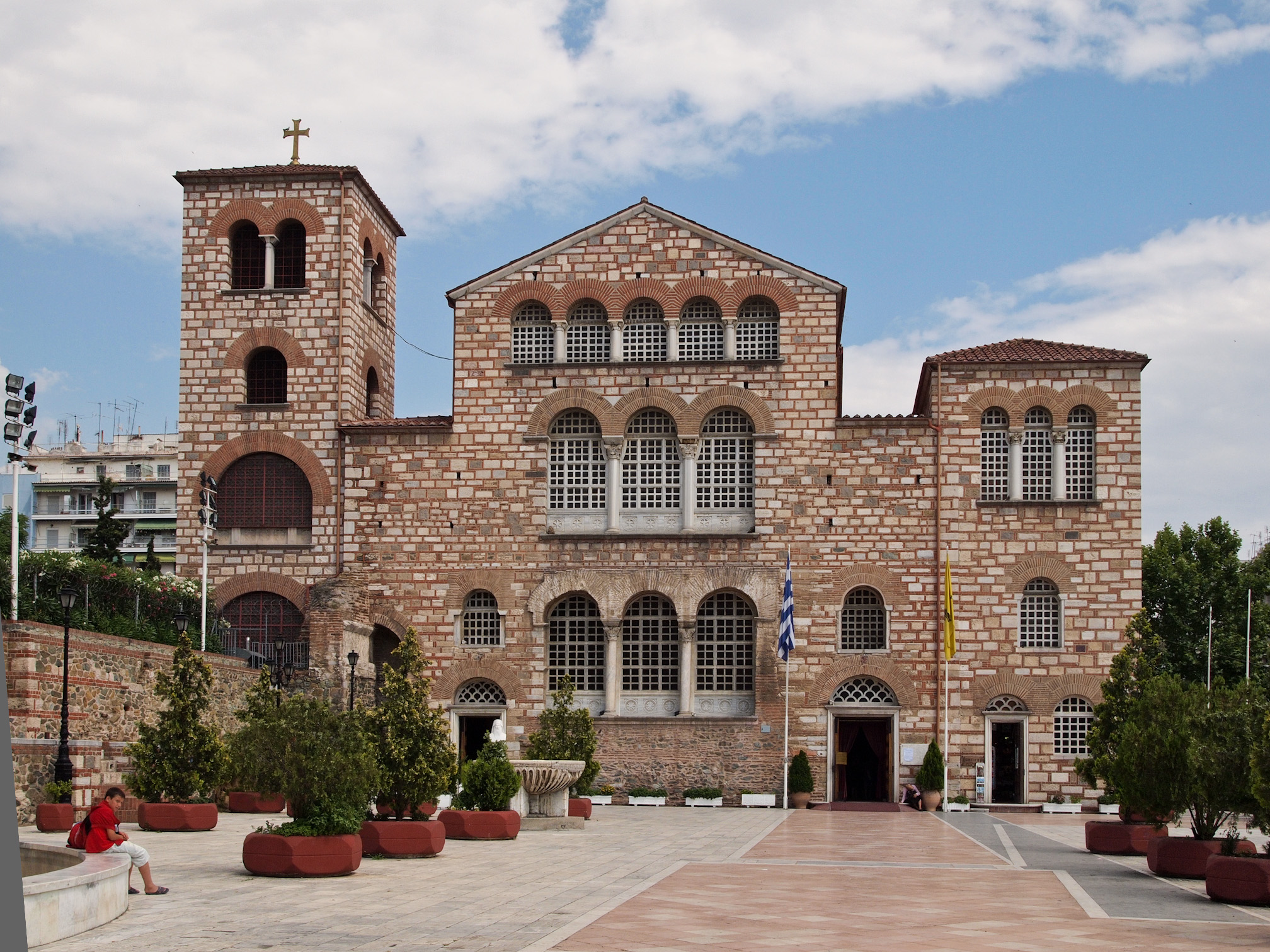
The church of Saint Demetrius, patron saint of the city, built in the fourth century, is the largest basilica in Greece and one of the city's most prominent Paleochristian monuments.

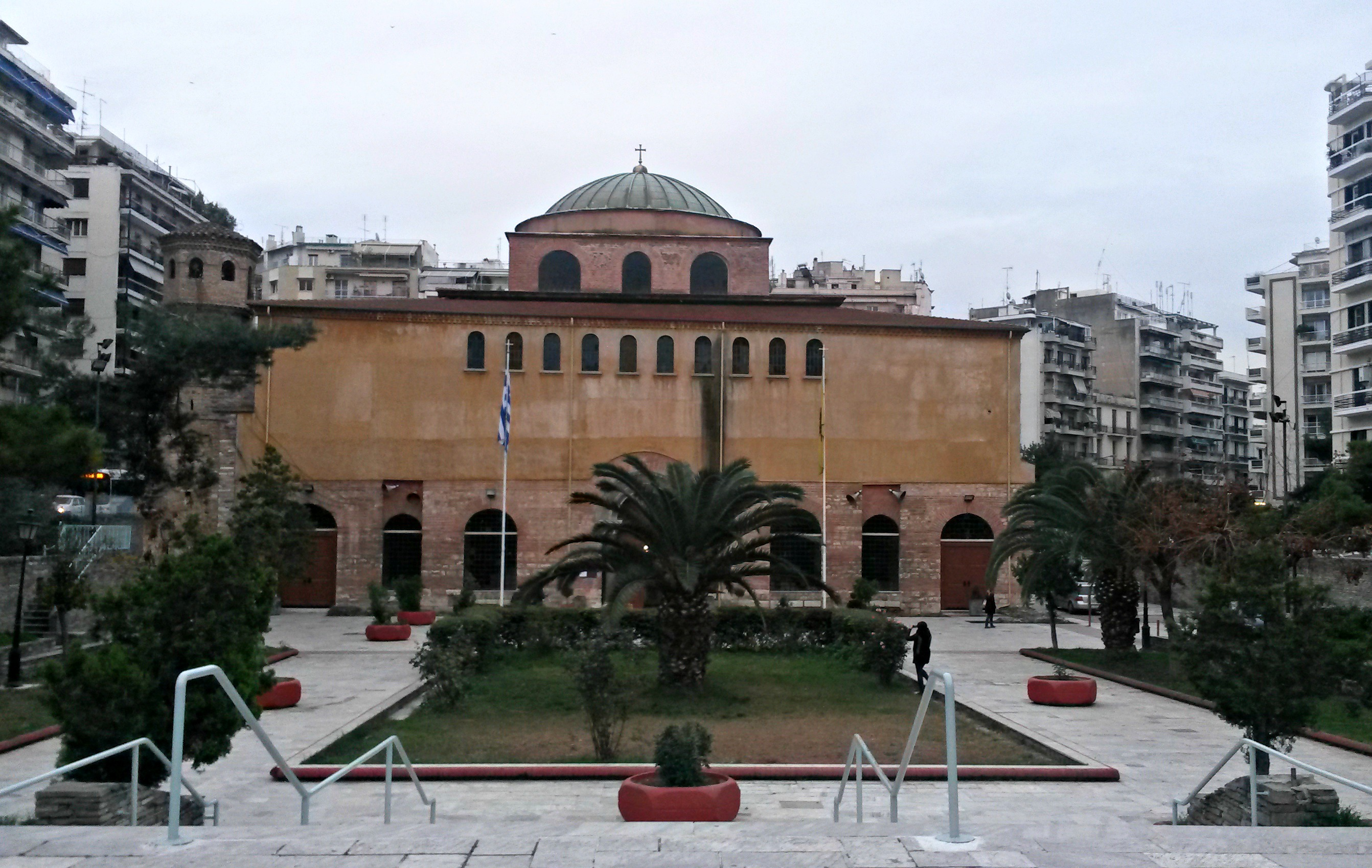
Hagia Sophia, Thessaloniki

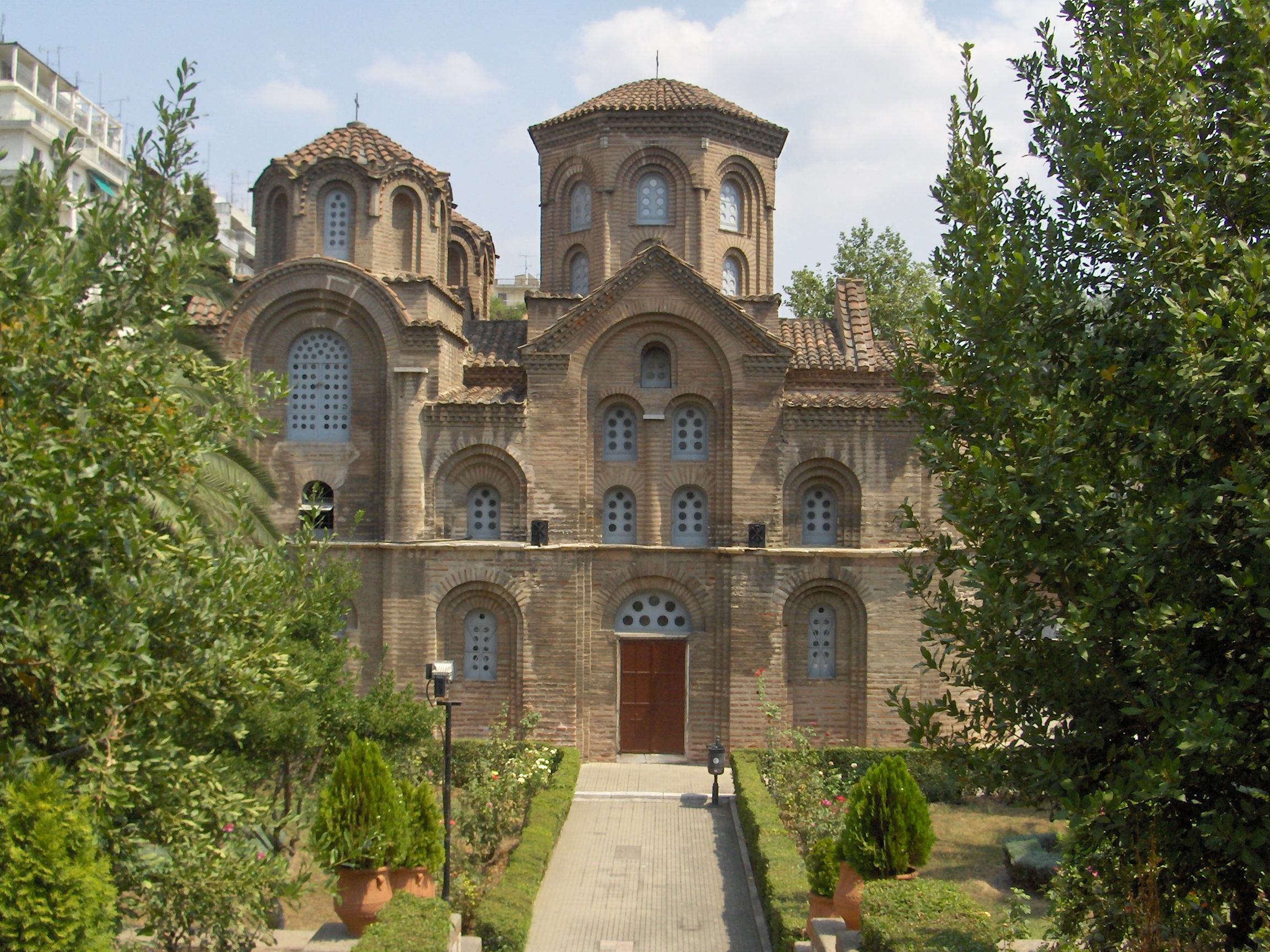
Panagia Chalkeon church in Thessaloniki (1028 AD), one of the 15 UNESCO World Heritage Sites in the city

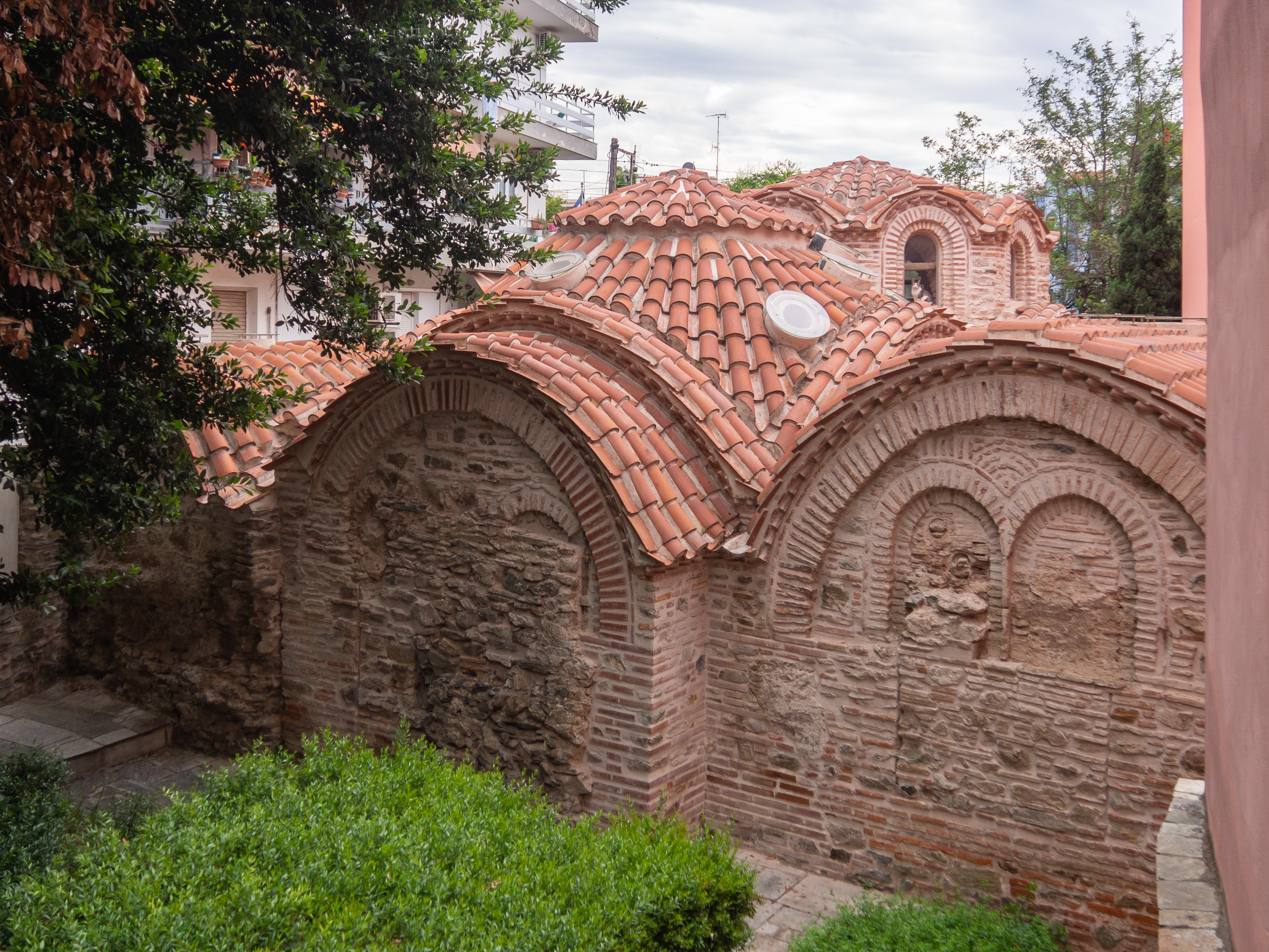
The Byzantine Bath of the Upper Town

Because of Thessaloniki's importance during the early Christian and Byzantine periods, the city is host to several Paleochristian monuments that have significantly contributed to the development of Byzantine art and architecture throughout the Byzantine Empire as well as Serbia. The evolution of Imperial Byzantine architecture and the prosperity of Thessaloniki go hand in hand, especially during the first years of the Empire, when the city continued to flourish. It was at that time that the Complex of Roman emperor Galerius was built, as well as the first church of Hagios Demetrios.

By the eighth century, the city had become an important administrative centre of the Byzantine Empire, and handled much of the Empire's Balkan affairs. During that time, the city saw the creation of more notable Christian churches that are now part of Thessaloniki's UNESCO World Heritage Site, such as the Church of Saint Catherine, the Hagia Sophia of Thessaloniki, the Church of the Acheiropoietos, the Church of Panagia Chalkeon. When the Ottoman Empire took control of Thessaloniki in 1430, most of the city's churches were converted into mosques, but have survived to this day. Travellers such as Paul Lucas and Abdulmejid I document the city's wealth in Christian monuments during the years of Ottoman control of the city.

The church of Hagios Demetrios burned down during the Great Thessaloniki Fire of 1917, as did many other city monuments, but it was rebuilt. During World War II, the city was extensively bombed and as such many of Thessaloniki's Paleochristian and Byzantine monuments were heavily damaged. Some of the sites were not restored until the 1980s. Thessaloniki has more monuments listed as a UNESCO World Heritage Site than any other city in Greece, a total of 15 monuments. They have been listed since 1988.

=== Urban sculpture ===
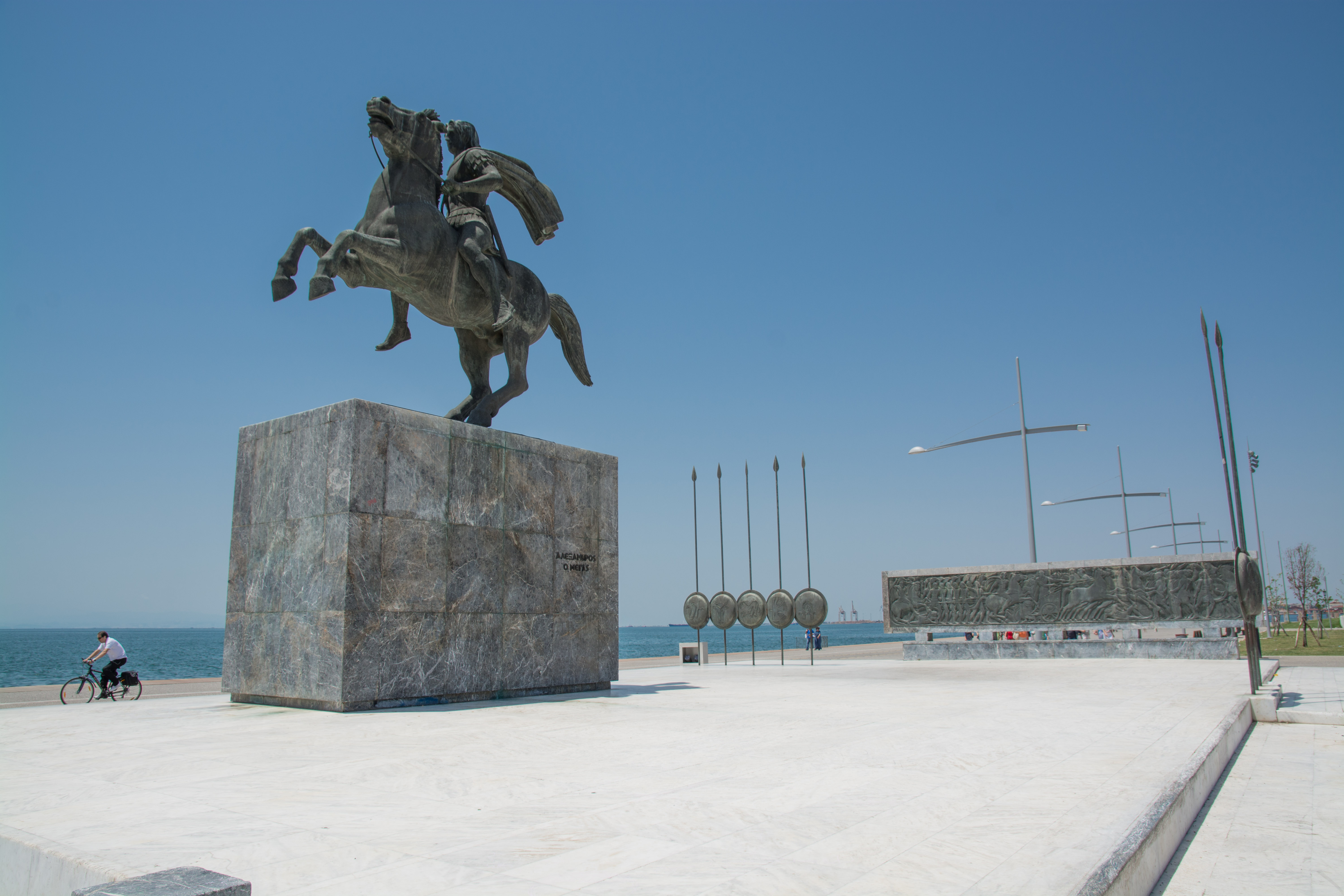
The equestrian statue of Alexander the Great on the promenade

There are around 150 statues or busts in the city. Probably the most famous one is the equestrian statue of Alexander the Great on the promenade, placed in 1973 and created by sculptor Evangelos Moustakas. An equestrian statue of Constantine I, by sculptor Georgios Dimitriades, is located in Demokratias Square. Other notable statues include that of Eleftherios Venizelos by sculptor Giannis Pappas, Pavlos Melas by Natalia Mela, the statue of Emmanouel Pappas by Memos Makris, Chrysostomos of Smyrna by Athanasios Apartis, Aristotle on Aristotelous Square and such as various creations by George Zongolopoulos, Philip II of Macedon opposite the White Tower.

=== Thessaloniki 2012 Programme ===
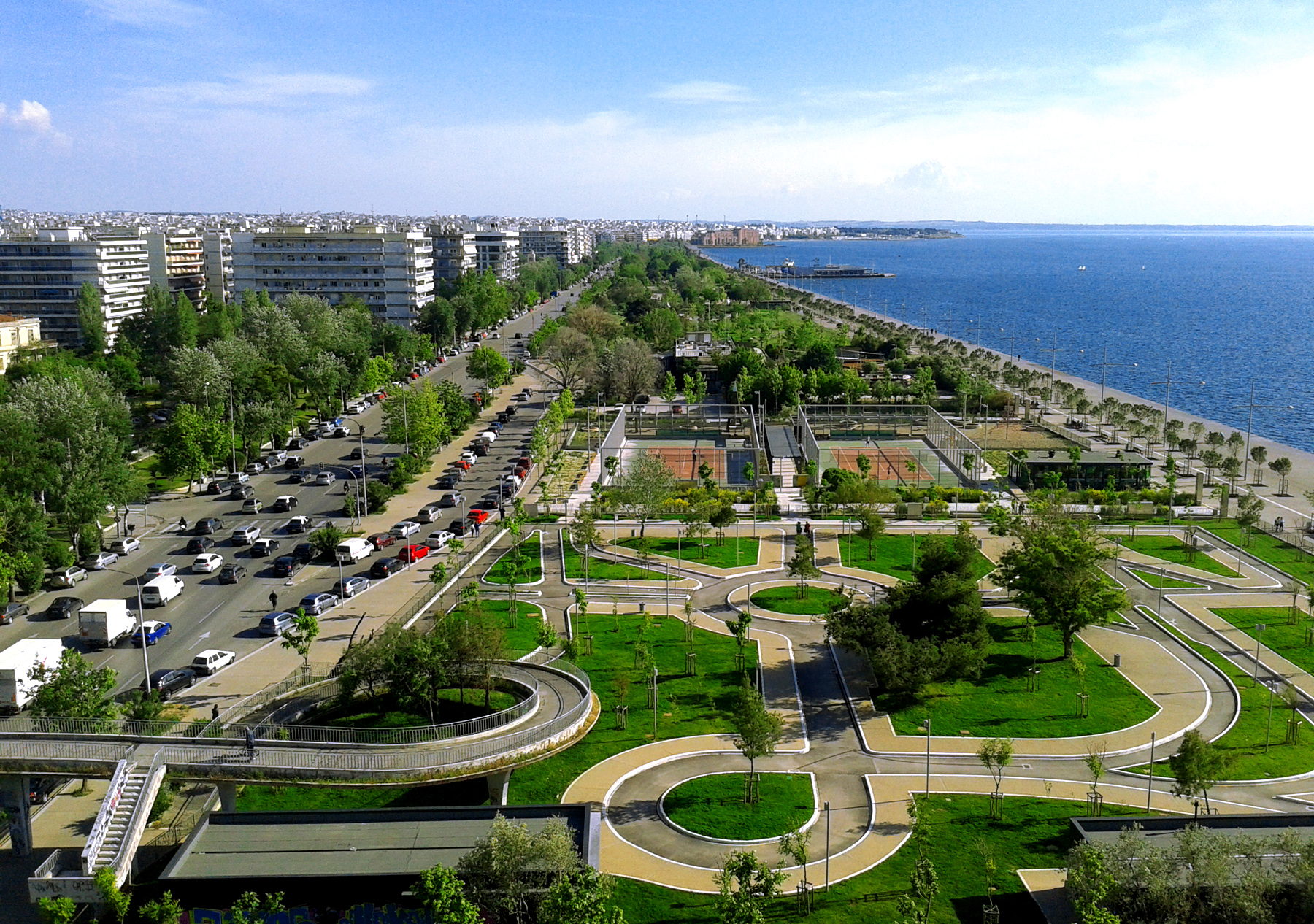
Aerial view of the newest section of the promenade (Nea Paralia), which was opened to the public in January 2014

With the 100th anniversary of the 1912 incorporation of Thessaloniki into Greece, the government announced a large-scale redevelopment programme for the city of Thessaloniki, which aims in addressing the current environmental and spatial problems that the city faces. More specifically, the programme will drastically change the physiognomy of the city by relocating the Thessaloniki International Exhibition Centre and grounds of the Thessaloniki International Fair outside the city centre and turning the current location into a large metropolitan park, redeveloping the coastal front of the city, relocating the city's numerous military camps and using the grounds and facilities to create large parklands and cultural centres; and the complete redevelopment of the harbour and the Lachanokipoi and Dendropotamos districts (behind and near the Port of Thessaloniki) into a commercial business district, with possible highrise developments.

The plan also envisions the creation of new wide avenues in the outskirts of the city and the creation of pedestrian-only zones in the city centre. Furthermore, the program includes plans to expand the jurisdiction of Seich Sou Forest National Park and the improvement of accessibility to and from the Old Town. The ministry has said that the project will take an estimated 15 years to be completed, in 2025.

Part of the plan has been implemented with extensive pedestrianisations within the city centre by the municipality of Thessaloniki and the revitalisation the eastern urban waterfront/promenade, Νέα Παραλία (Néa Paralía, lit. new promenade), with a modern and vibrant design. Its first section opened in 2008, having been awarded as the best public project in Greece of the last five years by the Hellenic Institute of Architecture.

The municipality of Thessaloniki's budget for the reconstruction of important areas of the city and the completion of the waterfront, opened in January 2014, was estimated at €28.2 million (US$39.9 million) for the year 2011 alone.

== Economy ==
Economy of Thessaloniki
- GDP of the Thessaloniki regional unit 2000–2023

Statistics
- GDP: €19.66 billion (nominal, 2023p) €24.24 billion (PPP, 2023p)
- GDP rank: 2nd in Greece
- GDP growth: ▲6.78% (nominal, 2023p)
- GDP per capita: ▲€18,100 (nominal, 2023p) ▲€22,400 (PPP, 2023p) (47% and 58% of the EU average)
- GDP by sector: agriculture: 2.03% industry: 20.16% services: 77.81% (2023p)
- Labour force: ▲540,470 (2023p)
- Unemployment: ▲14.4% (2023)
- Youth unemployment: ▼25.8% (2023)

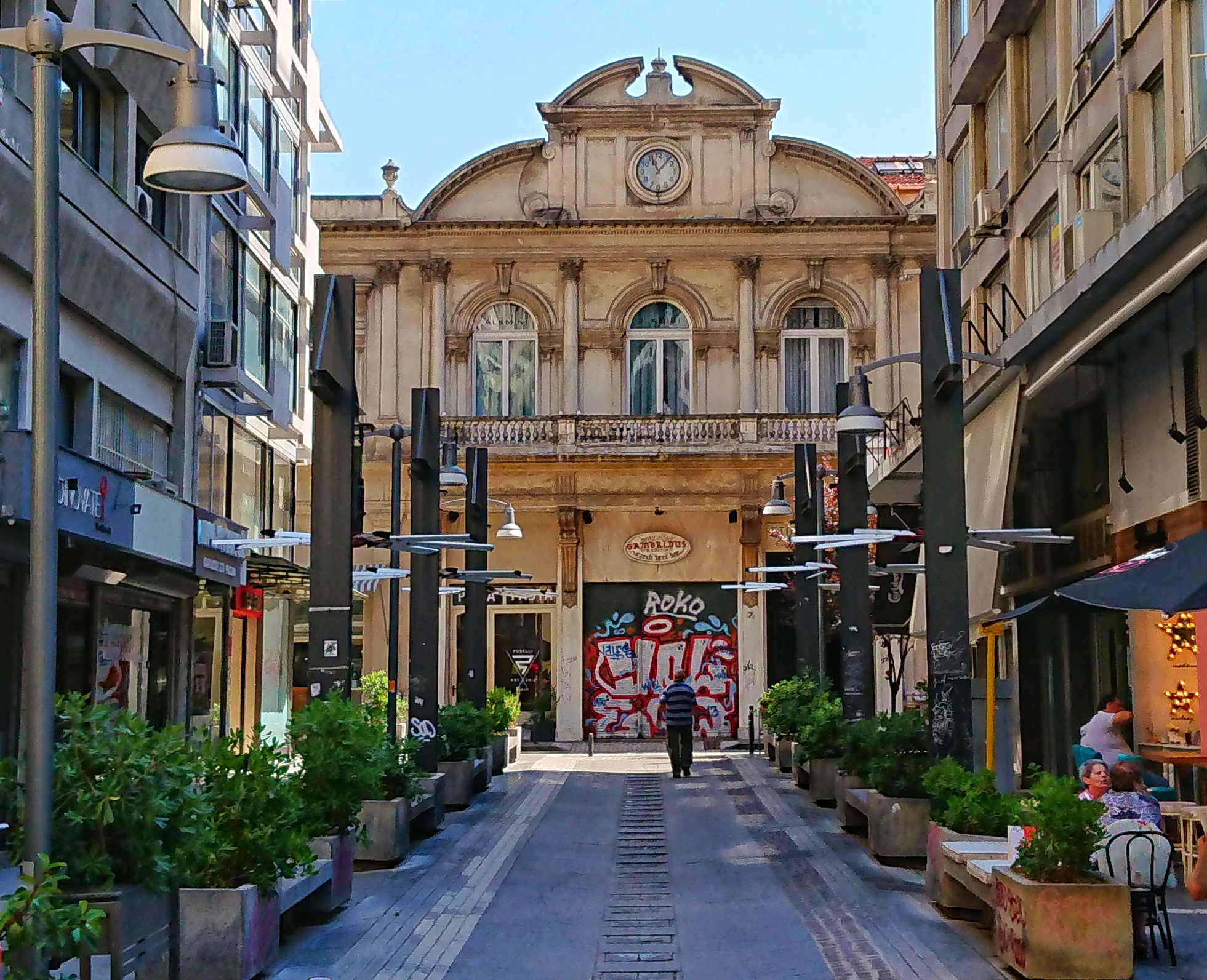
The old building of Banque de Salonique, now Stoa Malakopi

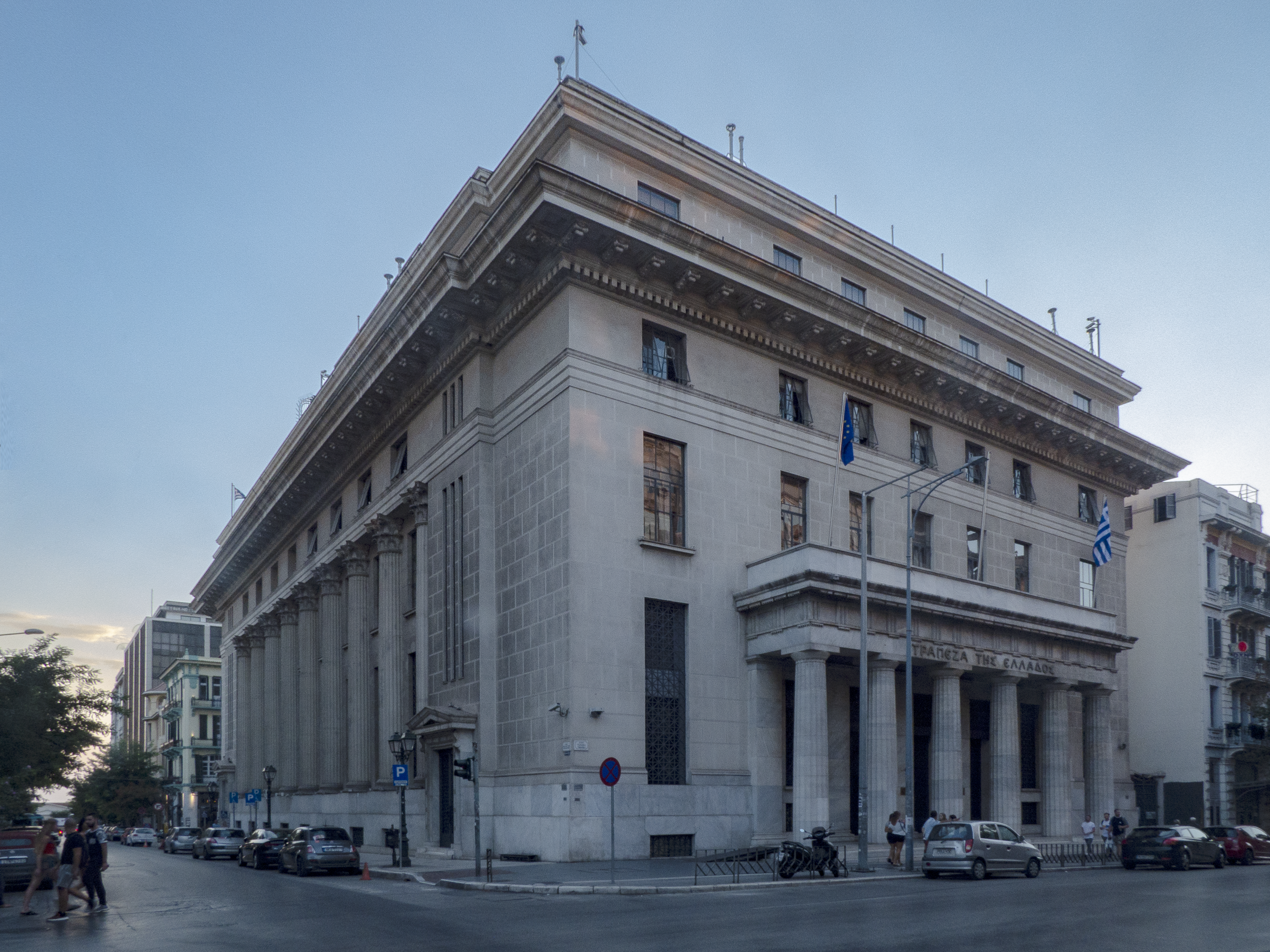
A building of the Bank of Greece

Thessaloniki rose to economic prominence as a major economic hub in the Balkans during the years of the Roman Empire. The Pax Romana and the city's strategic position allowed for the facilitation of trade between Rome and Byzantium (later Constantinople and now Istanbul) through Thessaloniki by means of the Via Egnatia. The Via Egnatia also functioned as an important line of communication between the Roman Empire and the nations of Asia, particularly in relation to the Silk Road.

With the partition of the Roman Empire into East (Byzantine) and West, Thessaloniki became the second-largest city of the Eastern Roman Empire after New Rome (Constantinople) in terms of economic might. Under the Empire, Thessaloniki was the largest port in the Balkans. As the city passed from Byzantium to the Republic of Venice in 1423, it was subsequently conquered by the Ottoman Empire. Under Ottoman rule the city retained its position as the most important trading hub in the Balkans. Manufacturing, shipping and trade were the most important components of the city's economy during the Ottoman period, and the majority of the city's trade at the time was controlled by ethnic Greeks. Plus, the Jewish community was also an important factor in the trade sector.

Historically important industries for the economy of Thessaloniki included tobacco (in 1946 35% of all tobacco companies in Greece were headquartered in the city, and 44% in 1979) and banking (in Ottoman years Thessaloniki was a major centre for investment from western Europe, with the Banque de Salonique having a capital of 20 million French francs in 1909).

=== Services ===
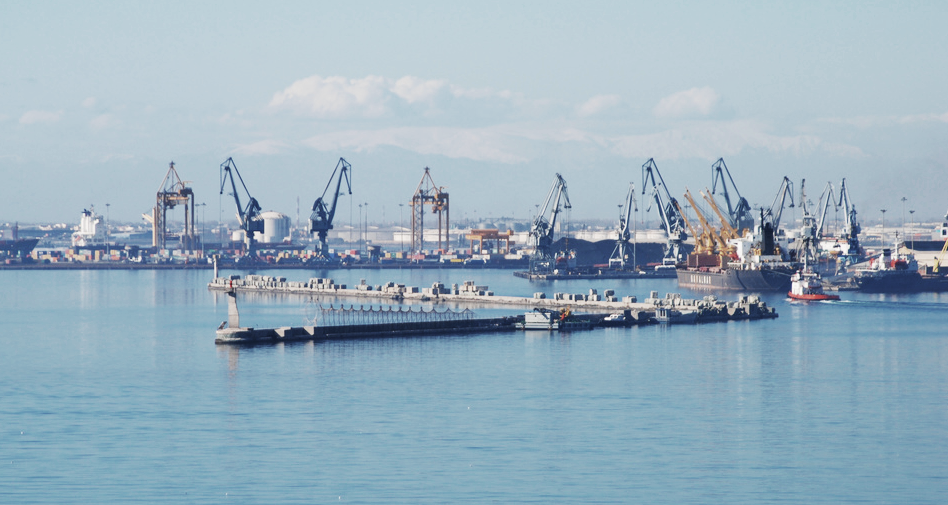
The port in 2009

The service sector accounts for nearly two-thirds of the total labour force of Thessaloniki. Of those working in services, 20% were employed in trade; 13% in education and healthcare; 7.1% in real estate; 6.3% in transport, communications and storage; 6.1% in the finance industry and service-providing organizations; 5.7% in public administration and insurance services; and 5.4% in hotels and restaurants.

The city's port, the Port of Thessaloniki, is one of the largest ports in the Aegean and as a free port, it functions as a major gateway to the Balkan hinterland. In 2010, more than 15.8 million tons of products went through the city's port, making it the second-largest port in Greece after Aghioi Theodoroi, surpassing Piraeus. At 273,282 TEUs, it is also Greece's second-largest container port after Piraeus. As a result, the city is a major transportation hub for the whole of south-eastern Europe, carrying, among other things, trade to and from the neighbouring countries.

In recent years Thessaloniki has begun to turn into a major port for cruising in the eastern Mediterranean. The Greek ministry of tourism considers Thessaloniki to be Greece's second most important commercial port, and companies such as Royal Caribbean International have expressed interest in adding the Port of Thessaloniki to their destinations. A total of 30 cruise ships are expected to arrive at Thessaloniki in 2011.

The GDP of Thessaloniki in comparison to that of Attica and the rest of the country (2012)

=== Companies ===
==== Recent history ====
After WWII and the Greek Civil War, heavy industrialization of the city's suburbs began in the mid-1950s.

During the 1980s, a spate of factory shutdowns occurred, mostly of automobile manufacturers, such as Agricola, AutoDiana, EBIAM, Motoemil, Pantelemidis-TITAN and C.AR. Since the 1990s, companies took advantage of cheaper labour markets and more lax regulations than in other countries, and among the largest companies to shut down factories were Goodyear, AVEZ pasta industry (one of the first industrial factories in northern Greece, built in 1926), Philkeram Johnson, AGNO dairy and VIAMIL.

However, Thessaloniki still remains a major business hub in the Balkans and Greece, with a number of important Greek companies headquartered in the city, such as the Hellenic Vehicle Industry (ELVO), Namco, Astra Airlines, Ellinair, Pyramis and MLS Multimedia, which introduced the first Greek-built smartphone in 2012.

==== Industry ====
In early 1960s, with the collaboration of Standard Oil and ESSO-Pappas, a large industrial zone was created, containing refineries, oil refinery and steel production (owned by Hellenic Steel Co.). The zone attracted also a series of different factories during the next decades.

Titan Cement has also facilities outside the city, on the road to Serres, such as the AGET Heracles, a member of the Lafarge group, and Alumil SA.

Multinational companies such as Air Liquide, Cyanamid, Nestlé, Pfizer, Coca-Cola Hellenic Bottling Company and Vivartia have also industrial facilities in the suburbs of the city.

==== Foodstuff ====
Foodstuff or drink companies headquartered in the city include the Macedonian Milk Industry (Mevgal), Allatini, Barbastathis, Hellenic Sugar Industry, Haitoglou Bros, Mythos Brewery, Malamatina, while the Goody's chain started from the city.

The American Farm School also is an important contributor to local food production.

=== Macroeconomic indicators ===
In 2011, the regional unit of Thessaloniki had a Gross Domestic Product of €18.293 billion (ranked second amongst the country's regional units), comparable to Bahrain or Cyprus, and a per capita of €15,900 (ranked 16th). In Purchasing Power Parity (PPP), the same indicators are €19,851 billion (2nd) and €17,200 (15th) respectively. In terms of comparison with the European Union average, Thessaloniki's GDP per capita indicator stands at 63% the EU average and 69% in PPP – this is comparable to the German state of Brandenburg. Overall, Thessaloniki accounts for 8.9% of the total economy of Greece. Between 1995 and 2008 Thessaloniki's GDP saw an average growth rate of 4.1% per annum (ranging from +14.5% in 1996 to −11.1% in 2005) while in 2011 the economy contracted by −7.8%.

== Demographics ==
=== Historical ethnic statistics ===
The tables below show the ethnic statistics of Thessaloniki during the end of the 19th and the beginning of the 20th century.

Year	Total population		Jewish		Turkish		Greek		Bulgarians		Roma		Other	
1890	118,000	100%	55,000	47%	26,000	22%	16,000	14%	10,000	8%	2,500	2%	8,500	7%
1910 *	135,000	100%	80,000	59%	20,000	15%	30,000	22%	1,000	0.7%	—	—	4,000	3%
Around 1913	157,889	100%	61,439	39%	45,889	29%	39,956	25%	6,263	4%	2,721	2%	1,621	

* 1910 study is considered highly influential demographic and statistical study authored by the Greek scholar and diplomat Athanasios Chalkiopoulos (Αθανάσιος Χαλκιόπουλος). Anyway data does't differ too much compared with others.

=== Population growth ===
Population
Year	Pop.	±%
100	200,000	—
1348	150,000	−25.0%
1453	40,000	−73.3%
1679	36,000	−10.0%
1842	70,000	+94.4%
1870	90,000	+28.6%
1882	85,000	−5.6%
1890	118,000	+38.8%
1902	126,000	+6.8%
1913	157,000	+24.6%
1917	230,000	+46.5%
1951	297,164	+29.2%
1961	377,026	+26.9%
1981	406,413	+7.8%
2001	954,027	+134.7%
2011	1,030,338	+8.0%
2021	1,091,424	+5.9%
From 2001 on, data on the city's metropolitan area. References:

The municipality of Thessaloniki is the most populous in the Thessaloniki Urban Area. Its population has increased in the latest census and the metropolitan area's population rose to over one million. The city forms the base of the Thessaloniki metropolitan area, with latest census in 2021 giving it a population of 1,091,424.

Population of the Municipality and Metropolitan areas of Thessaloniki
Year	Municipality	Metropolitan area	rank
2001	363,987	954,027	(Greece) 2nd
2011	325,182	1,030,338	
2021	317,778	1,091,424	(Greece) 2nd

=== Jews of Thessaloniki ===
Paths of Jewish immigration to the city

The Jewish population in Greece is the oldest in mainland Europe (see Romaniotes). When Paul the Apostle came to Thessaloniki, he taught in the area of what today is called Upper City. Later, during the Ottoman period, with the coming of Sephardic Jews from Spain, the community of Thessaloniki became mostly Sephardic. Thessaloniki became the largest centre in Europe of the Sephardic Jews, who nicknamed the city la madre de Israel (Israel's mother) and "Jerusalem of the Balkans". It also included the historically significant and ancient Greek-speaking Romaniote community. During the Ottoman era, Thessaloniki's Sephardic community was half of the population according to the Ottoman Census of 1902 and almost 40% the city's population of 157,000 about 1913; Jewish merchants were prominent in commerce until the ethnic Greek population increased after Thessaloniki was incorporated into the Kingdom of Greece in 1913. By the 1680s, about 300 families of Sephardic Jews, followers of Sabbatai Zevi, had converted to Islam, becoming a sect known as the Dönmeh (convert), and migrated to Salonika, whose population was majority Jewish. They established an active community that thrived for about 250 years. Many of their descendants later became prominent in trade. Many Jewish inhabitants of Thessaloniki spoke Judeo-Spanish, the Romance language of the Sephardic Jews.

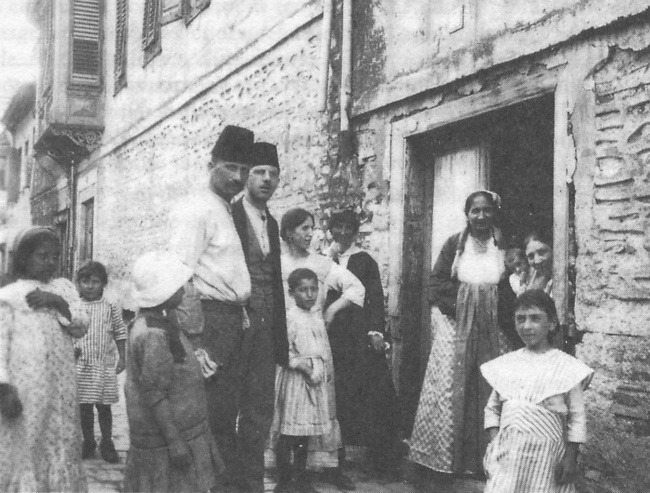
Jewish family of Salonika in 1917

From the second half of the 19th century with the Ottoman reforms, the Jewish community had a new revival. Many French and especially Italian Jews (from Livorno and other cities), influential in introducing new methods of education and developing new schools and intellectual environments for the Jewish population, were established in Thessaloniki. Such modernists introduced also new techniques and ideas from the industrialised Western Europe and from the 1880s the city began to industrialize. The Italian-Jewish Allatini brothers led Jewish entrepreneurship, establishing milling and other food industries, brickmaking and processing plants for tobacco. Several traders supported the introduction of a large textile-production industry, superseding the weaving of cloth in a system of artisanal production. Notable names of the era include among others the Italo-Jewish Modiano family and the Allatini. Benrubis founded also in 1880 one of the first retail companies in the Balkans.

After the Balkan Wars, Thessaloniki was incorporated into the Kingdom of Greece in 1913. At first, the community feared that the annexation would lead to difficulties and during the first years its political stance was, in general, anti-Venizelist and pro-royalist/conservative. The Great Thessaloniki Fire of 1917 during World War I burned much of the centre of the city and left 50,000 Jews homeless of the total of 72,000 residents who were burned out. Having lost homes and their businesses, many Jews emigrated to the United States, Palestine, and Paris. They could not wait for the government to create a new urban plan for rebuilding, which was eventually done.

After the Greco-Turkish War in 1922 and the bilateral population exchange between Greece and Turkey, many refugees came to Greece. Nearly 100,000 ethnic Greeks resettled in Thessaloniki, reducing the proportion of Jews in the total community. After this, Jews made up about 20% of the city's population. During the interwar period, Greece granted Jewish citizens the same civil rights as other Greek citizens. In March 1926, Greece re-emphasized that all citizens of Greece enjoyed equal rights, and a considerable proportion of the city's Jews decided to stay. During the Metaxas regime, the stance towards Jews improved even more.

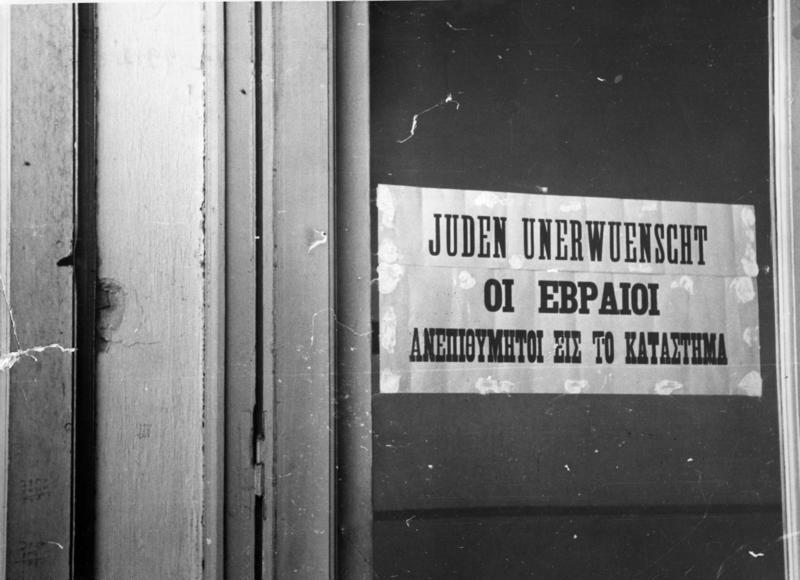
"Jews not welcomed" sign during the Axis occupation

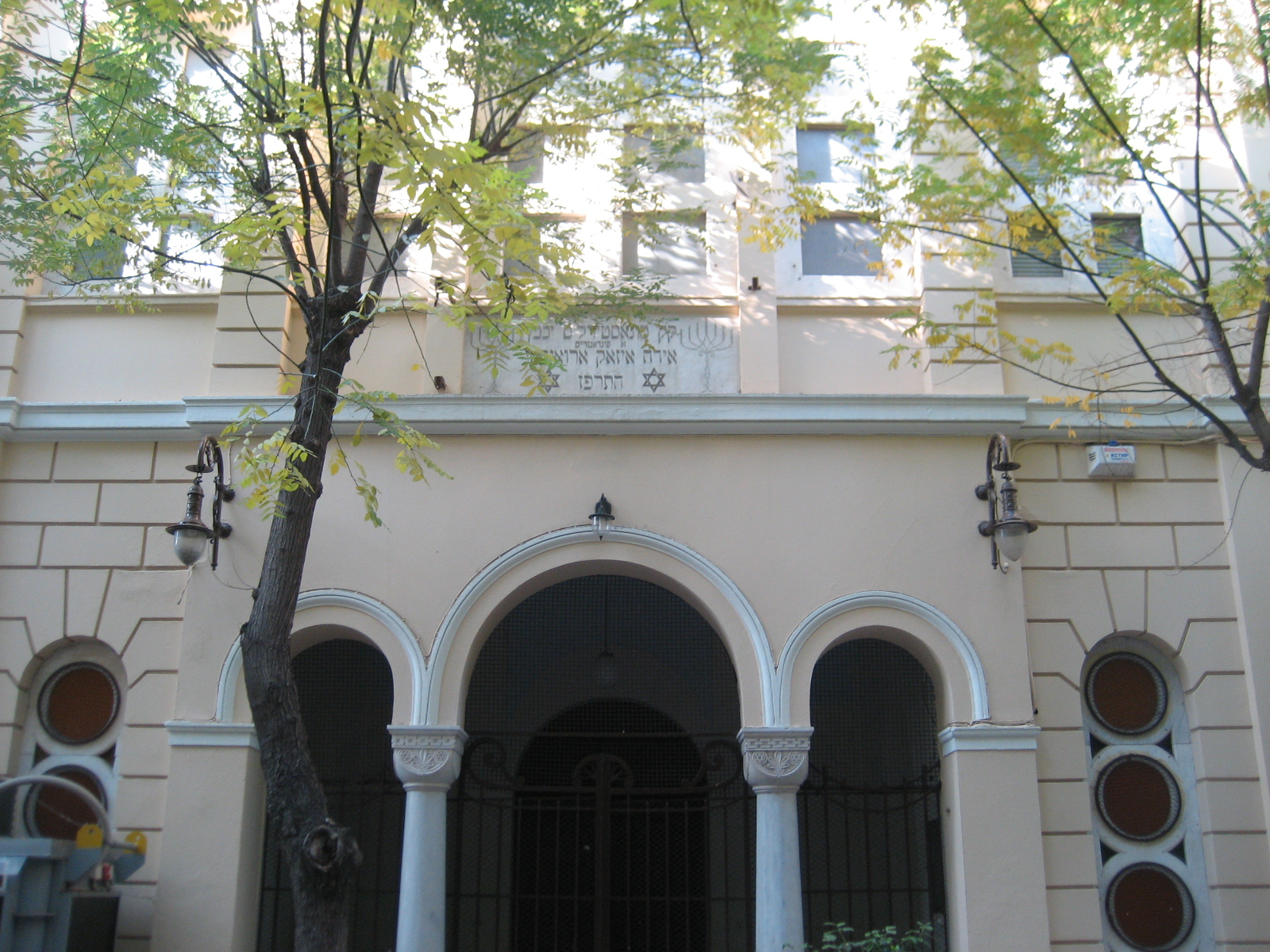
Monastir Synagogue

World War II brought disaster for the Jewish Greeks, since in 1941 the Germans occupied Greece and began actions against the Jewish population. Greeks of the Resistance helped save some of the Jewish residents. By the 1940s, the great majority of the Jewish Greek community firmly identified as both Greek and Jewish. According to Misha Glenny, such Greek Jews had largely not encountered "anti-Semitism as in its North European form."

In 1943, the Nazis began brutal actions against the historic Jewish population in Thessaloniki, forcing them into a ghetto near the railroad lines and beginning deportation to concentration and labor camps. They deported and exterminated approximately 94% of Thessaloniki's remaining Jews of all ages during the Holocaust. In addition to the extermination of the Jewish community of the city, the Nazis systematically razed Jewish monuments and history. Prominently, the destruction included the bulldozing of the ancient Jewish Cemetery, which at that point included around 500,000 tombs, with the marble gravestones being repurposed as building material for roads and new construction. The Thessaloniki Holocaust memorial in Eleftherias ("Freedom") Square was built in 1997 in memory of all the Jewish people from Thessaloniki murdered in the Holocaust. The site was chosen because it was the place where Jewish residents were rounded up before embarking on trains for concentration camps. Today, a community of around 1,200 remains in the city. Communities of descendants of Thessaloniki Jews – both Sephardic and Romaniote – live in other areas, mainly the United States and Israel. Israeli singer Yehuda Poliker recorded a song about the Jewish people of Thessaloniki, called "Wait for me, Thessaloniki".

On 15 March, 2026, 83 years after the first deportation to Auschwitz, hundreds of people march in the streets under the sign saying: "Never Again". The first train departed from Thessaloniki on 15, March 1943, followed by many more, eventually taking approximately 50,000 people to the Auschwitz-Birkenau camp for extermination.

Year	Total population	Jewish population	Jewish percentage	Source
1842	70,000	36,000	51%	Jakob Philipp Fallmerayer
1870	90,000	50,000	56%	Greek schoolbook (G.K. Moraitopoulos, 1882)
1882/84	85,000	48,000	56%	Ottoman government census
1902	126,000	62,000	49%	Ottoman government census
1913	157,889	61,439	39%	Greek government census
1917	271,157	52,000	19%	
1943		50,000		
2000	363,987	1,000	0.27%	

=== Others ===
Since the late 19th century, many merchants from Western Europe (mainly from France and Italy) were established in the city. They had an important role in the social and economic life of the city and introduced new industrial techniques. Their main district was what is known today as the "Frankish district" /"Φραγκομαχαλάς" (near Ladadika), where the Catholic church designed by Vitaliano Poselli is also situated. A part of them left after the incorporation of the city into the Greek kingdom, while others, who were of Jewish faith, were exterminated by the Nazis.

The Bulgarian community of the city increased during the late 19th century. The community had a Men's High School, a Girl's High School, a trade union and a gymnastics society. A large part of them were Catholics, as a result of actions by the Lazarists society, which had its base in the city.

Another group is the Armenian community which dates back to the Byzantine and Ottoman periods. During the 20th century, after the Armenian genocide and the defeat of the Greek army in the Greco-Turkish War (1919–22), many fled to Greece including Thessaloniki. There is also an Armenian cemetery and an Armenian church at the centre of the city.

== Culture ==
=== Leisure and entertainment ===
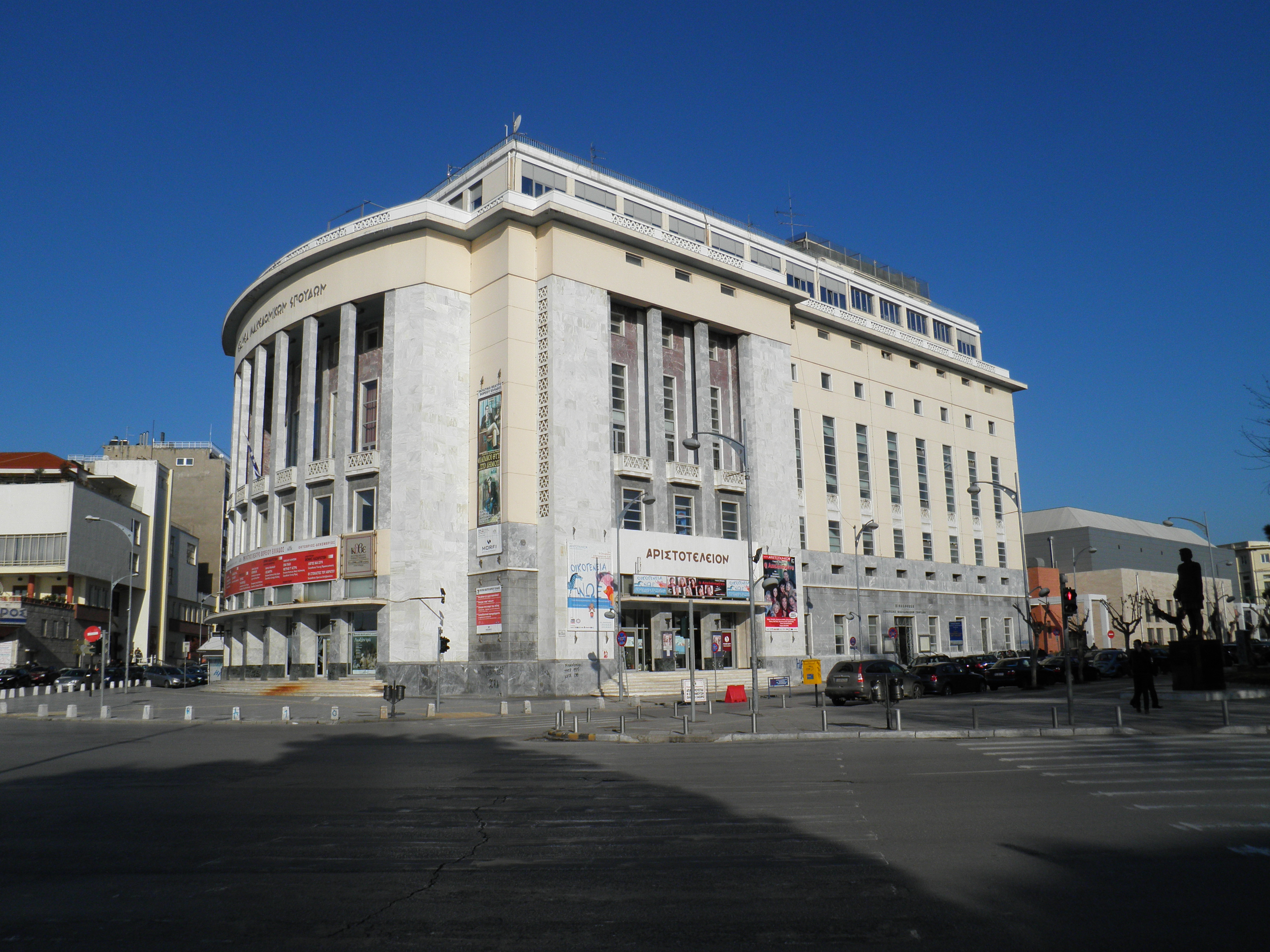
The building of the Society of Macedonian studies, seat of the National Theatre of Northern Greece

Thessaloniki is regarded not only as the cultural and entertainment capital of northern Greece but also the cultural capital of the country as a whole. The city's main theaters, run by the National Theatre of Northern Greece (Greek: Κρατικό Θέατρο Βορείου Ελλάδος) which was established in 1961, include the Theater of the Society of Macedonian Studies, where the National Theater is based, the Royal Theater (Βασιλικό Θέατρο) – the first base of the National Theater – Moni Lazariston, and the Earth Theater and Forest Theater, both amphitheatrical open-air theatres overlooking the city.

Thessaloniki Concert Hall

The title of the European Capital of Culture in 1997 saw the birth of the city's first opera and today forms an independent section of the National Theatre of Northern Greece. The opera is based at the Thessaloniki Concert Hall, one of the largest concert halls in Greece. Recently a second building was also constructed and designed by Japanese architect Arata Isozaki. Thessaloniki is also the seat of two symphony orchestras, the Thessaloniki State Orchestra and the Symphony Orchestra of the Municipality of Thessaloniki. Olympion Theater, the site of the Thessaloniki International Film Festival and the Plateia Assos Odeon multiplex are the two major cinemas in downtown Thessaloniki. The city also has a number of multiplex cinemas in major shopping malls in the suburbs, most notably in Mediterranean Cosmos, the largest retail and entertainment development in the Balkans.

Tsimiski Avenue, Mitropoleos Ave and Proxenou Koromila Street are the city's most famous shopping streets and are among Greece's most expensive and exclusive high streets. The city is also home to one of Greece's most famous and prestigious hotels, Makedonia Palace 5-star hotel, the Hyatt Regency Casino Thessaloniki and hotel (the biggest casino in Greece and one of the biggest in Europe) and Waterland, the largest water park in southeastern Europe.

The city has long been known in Greece for its vibrant city culture, including having the most cafes and bars per capita of any city in Europe; and as having some of the best nightlife and entertainment in the country, thanks to its large young population and multicultural feel. Lonely Planet listed Thessaloniki among the world's "ultimate party cities". Restaurant and bar areas include the Ladadika area near the port, Nikis Avenue on the waterfront, the alleyways between Agias Sofias Square and Aristotelous Square, the waterfront of Kalamarià neighbourhood, and the Eptapirgio neighbourhood overlooking the city.

=== Parks and recreation ===
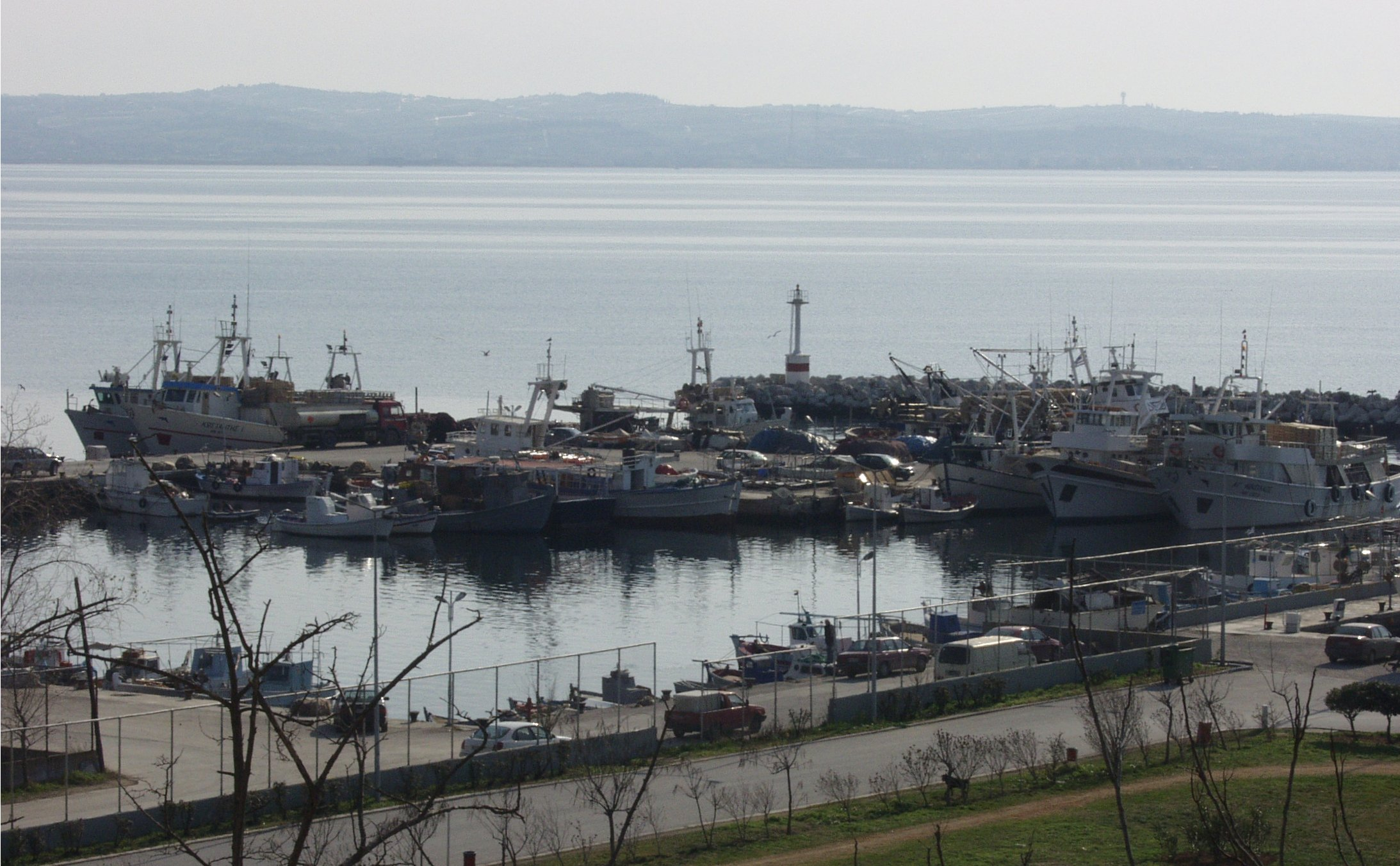
Marina of Aretsou

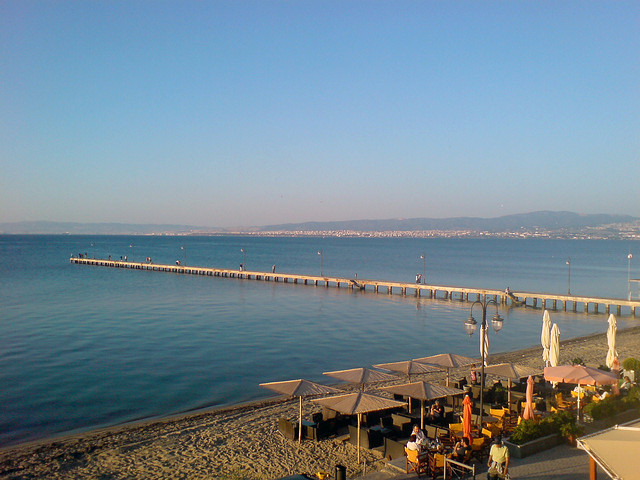
Part of the coastline of the southeastern suburb of Peraia on the Thermaic Gulf, with views towards Thessaloniki

Although Thessaloniki is not renowned for its parks and greenery throughout its urban area, where green spaces are few, it has several large open spaces around its waterfront, namely the central city gardens of Palios Zoologikos Kipos (which is recently being redeveloped to also include rock climbing facilities, a new skatepark and paintball range), the park of Pedion tou Areos, which also holds the city's annual floral expo; and the parks of the Renowned Nea Paralia (Restructured waterfront) spanning for 3 km (2 mi) along the coast, beginning from the White Tower to the concert hall.

The Nea Paralia parks are used throughout the year for a variety of events, while they open up to the Thessaloniki waterfront, which is lined with several cafés and bars; and during summer is full of Thessalonians enjoying their long evening walks (referred to as "volta" or “kafès” and is embedded into the culture of the city). Having undergone an extensive revitalization, the city's waterfront today features a total of 12 thematic gardens/parks.

Thessaloniki's proximity to places such as the national parks of Pieria and beaches of Chalkidiki allow its residents to easily have access to some of the best outdoor recreation in Europe; however, the city is also right next to the Séih Su national park, just 3.5 km (2 mi) away from Thessaloniki's city centre; and offers residents and visitors alike, quiet viewpoints towards the city, mountain bike trails and landscaped hiking paths. The city's zoo, which is operated by the municipality of Thessaloniki, is also located nearby the national park.

Other recreation spaces throughout the Thessaloniki metropolitan area include the Fragma Thermis, a landscaped parkland near Thermi and the Delta wetlands west of the city centre; while urban beaches of Peréa, Nea Mihaniona and Ayia Triada, continuously awarded with the Blue Flag beach award, are located along the 10 km (6 mi) coastline of Thessaloniki's southeastern suburbs of Thermaikos gulf, about 20 km (12 mi) away from the city centre.

=== Museums and galleries ===
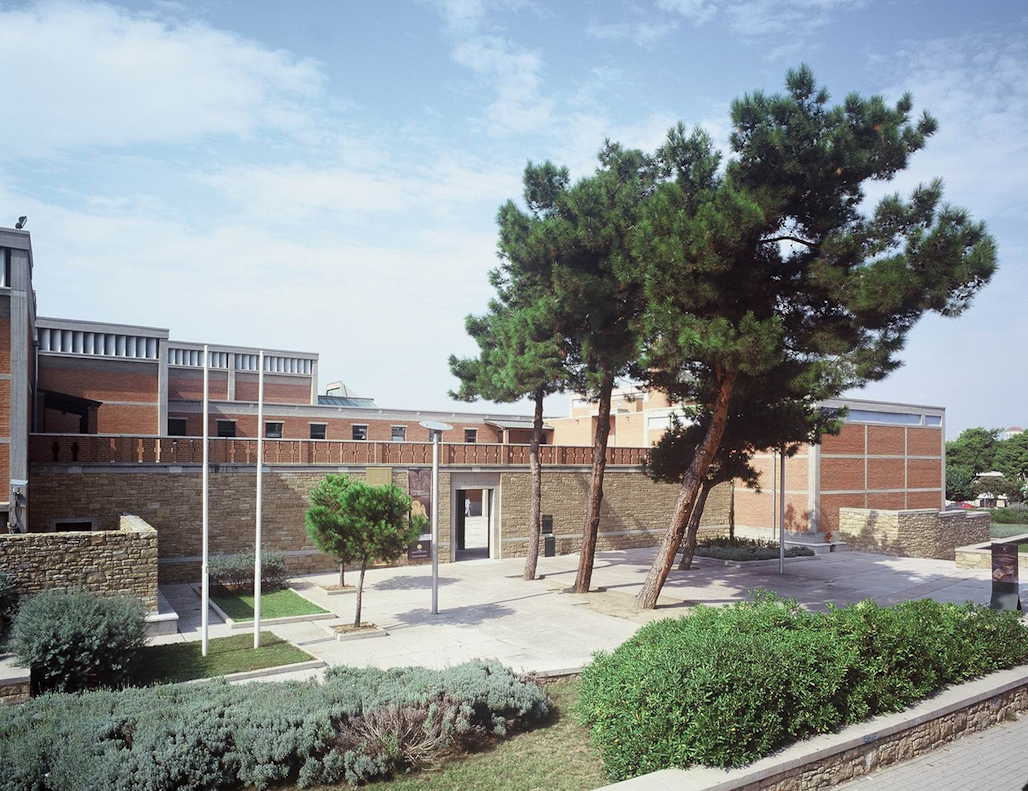
View of the Museum of Byzantine Culture

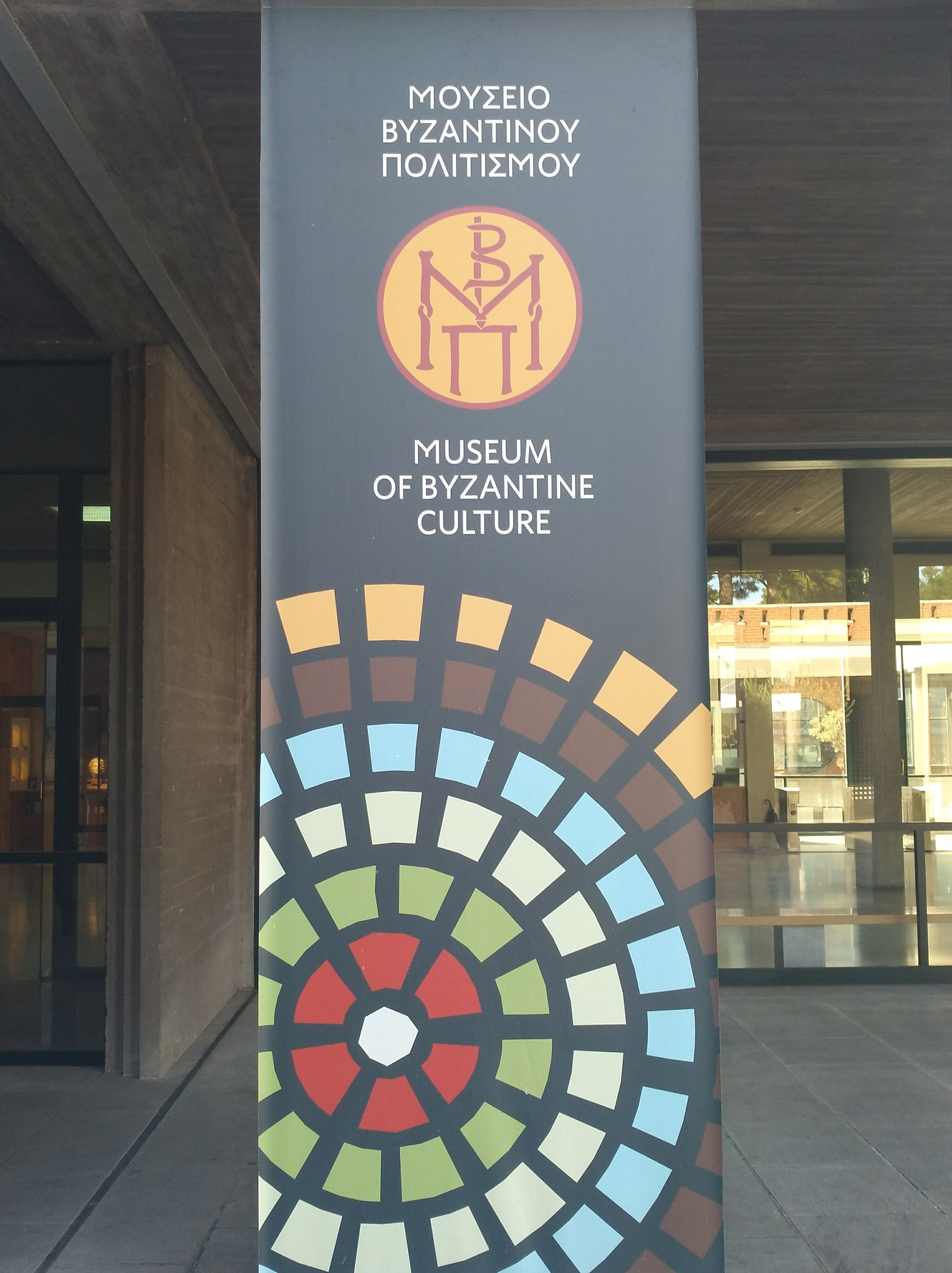
The Museum of Byzantine Culture, Thessaloniki

Because of the city's rich and diverse history, Thessaloniki houses many museums dealing with many different eras in history. Two of the city's most famous museums include the National Archaeological Museum of Thessaloniki and the Byzantine Culture Museum of Thessaloniki.

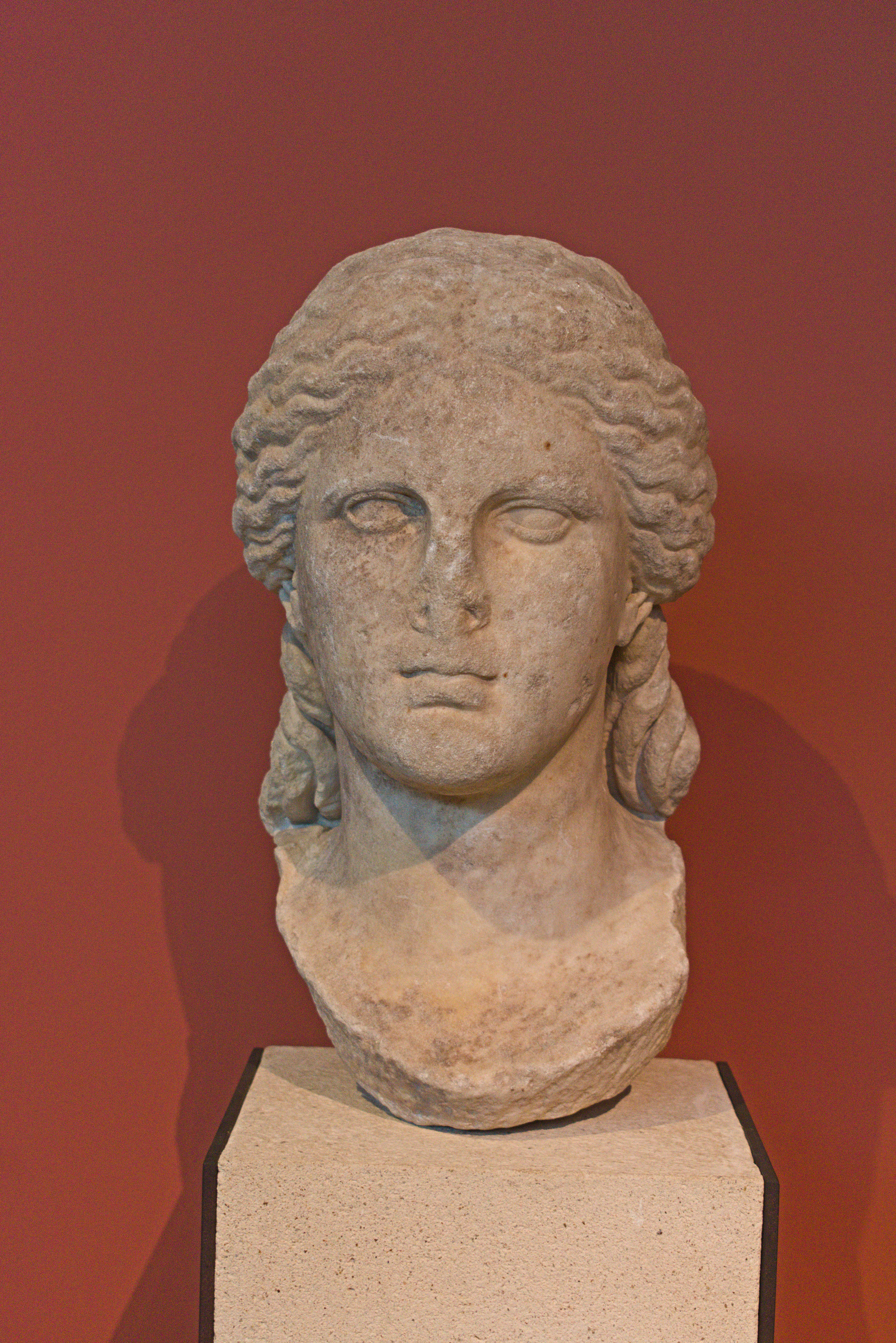
Head of Isis, Archaeological Museum, Thessaloniki. Early 3rd century BC (2021).

The Archaeological Museum of Thessaloniki, situated in Manolis Andronikos Street–ad honorem of the famous archaeologist that excavated Royal Palaces of the Macedonian Kingdom specifically King Phillip II's tomb, was established in 1962 and houses some of the most important ancient Macedonian artifacts, including an extensive collection of golden artwork from the royal palaces of Aigai and Pella. It also houses exhibits from Macedon's prehistoric past, dating from the Neolithic to the Bronze Age.

The Museum of Byzantine Culture is one of the city's most famous museums, showcasing the city's glorious Byzantine past. The museum was also awarded Council of Europe's museum prize in 2005. The museum of the White Tower of Thessaloniki houses a series of galleries relating to the city's past, from the creation of the White Tower until recent years.

One of the most modern museums in the city is the Thessaloniki Science Center and Technology Museum (NOESIS) and is one of the most high-tech museums in Greece and southeastern Europe. It features the largest planetarium in Greece, a cosmotheatre with the country's largest flat screen, an amphitheater, a motion simulator with 3D projection and 6-axis movement and exhibition spaces. Other industrial and technological museums in the city include the Railway Museum of Thessaloniki, which houses an original Orient Express train, the War Museum of Thessaloniki and others. The city also has a number of educational and sports museums, including the Thessaloniki History Centre and the Thessaloniki Olympic Museum.

The Atatürk Museum in Thessaloniki is the historic house where Mustafa Kemal Atatürk, founder of modern-day Turkey, was born. The house is now part of the Turkish consulate complex, but admission to the museum is free. The museum contains historic information about Mustafa Kemal Atatürk and his life, especially while he was in Thessaloniki. Other ethnological museums of the sort include the Historical Museum of the Balkan Wars, the Jewish Museum of Thessaloniki and the Museum of the Macedonian Struggle, containing information about the anti-Ottoman rebellions of the late 19th and early 20th centuries. Construction on the Holocaust Museum of Greece began in the city in 2018. It is set to open in 2026.

The city also has a number of important art galleries. Such include the Macedonian Museum of Contemporary Art, housing exhibitions from a number of well-known Greek and foreign artists. The Teloglion Foundation of Art is part of Aristotle University of Thessaloniki and includes an extensive collection of works by important artists of the 19th and 20th centuries, including works by prominent Greeks and native Thessalonians. The Thessaloniki Museum of Photography also houses a number of important exhibitions, and is located within the old port of Thessaloniki.

=== Archaeological sites ===
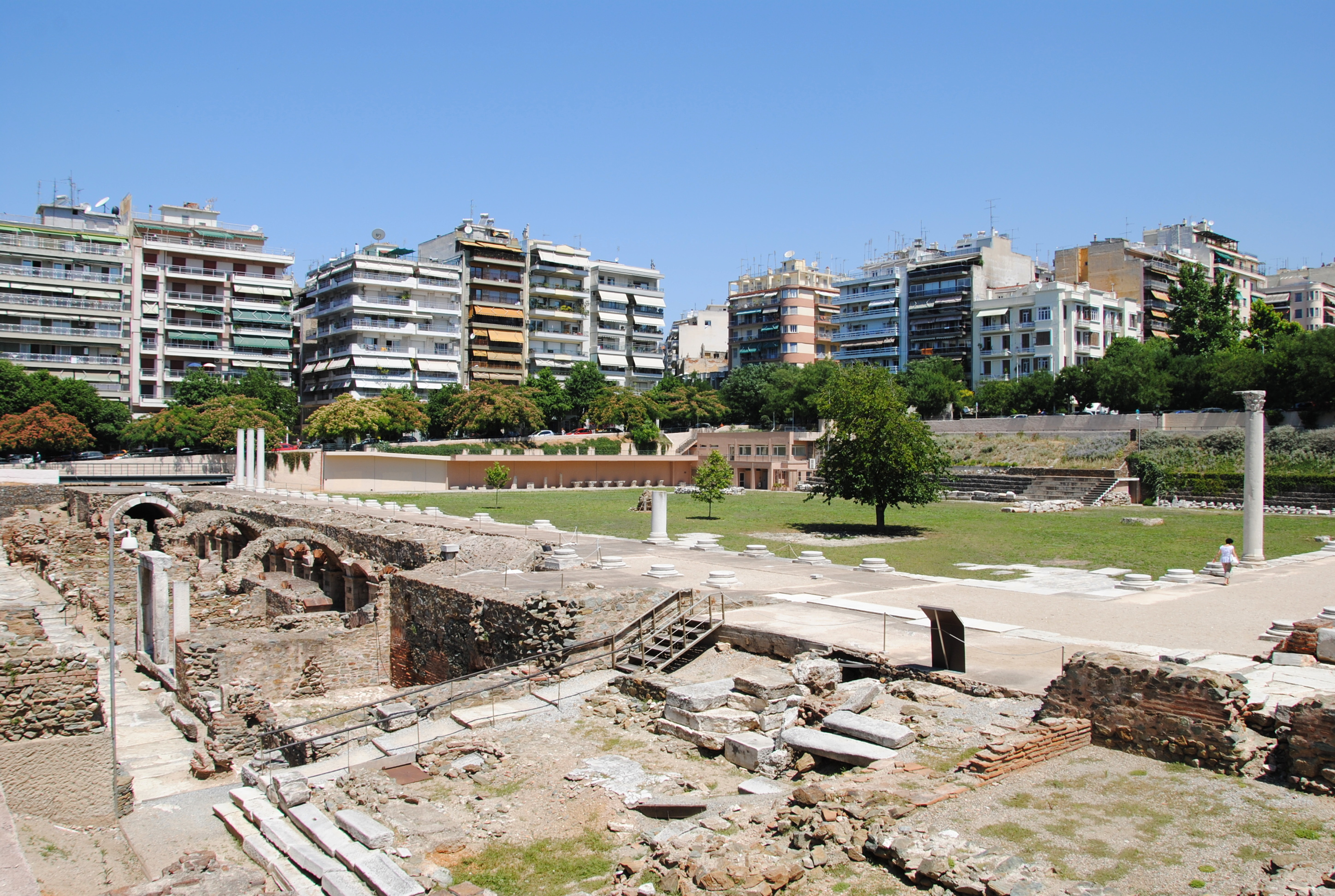
View of the Roman Forum (Ancient Agora)

Thessaloniki is home to a number of prominent archaeological sites. Apart from its recognized UNESCO World Heritage Sites, Thessaloniki features a large two-terraced Roman forum featuring two-storey stoas, dug up by accident in the 1960s. The forum complex also boasts two Roman baths, one of which has been excavated while the other is buried underneath the city. The forum also features a small theater, which was also used for gladiatorial games. Although the initial complex was not built in Roman times, it was largely refurbished in the second century. It is believed that the forum and the theater continued to be used until at least the sixth century.

Another important archaeological site is the imperial palace complex which Roman emperor Galerius, located at Navarinou Square, commissioned when he made Thessaloniki the capital of his portion of the Roman Empire. The large octagonal portion of the complex, most of which survives to this day, is believed to have been an imperial throne room. Various mosaics from the palatial complex have also survived. Some historians believe that the complex must have been in use as an imperial residence until the 11th century.

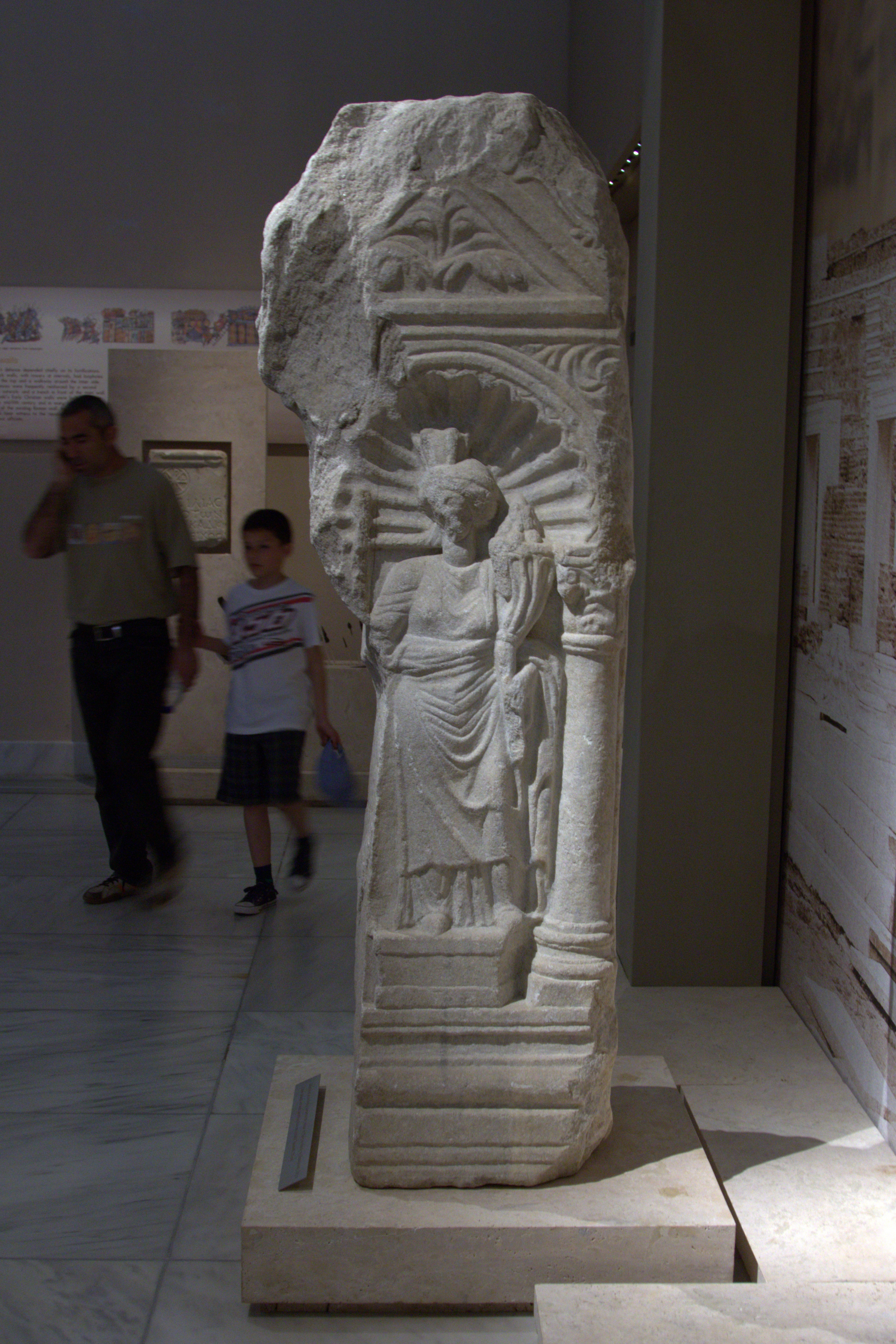
A fourth-century Roman column with a female figure in relief, perhaps the personification of Thessalonica.

Not far from the palace itself is the Arch of Galerius, known colloquially as the Kamara. The arch was built to commemorate the emperor's campaigns against the Persians. The original structure featured three arches; however, only two full arches and part of the third survive to this day. Many of the arches' marble parts survive as well, although it is mostly the brick interior that can be seen today.

Other monuments of the city's past, such as Las Incantadas, a Caryatid portico from the ancient forum, have been removed or destroyed over the years. Las Incantadas in particular are on display at the Louvre. Thanks to a private donation of €180,000, it was announced on 6 December 2011 that a replica of Las Incantadas would be commissioned and later put on display in Thessaloniki.

The construction of the Thessaloniki Metro inadvertently started the largest archaeological dig not only of the city, but of Northern Greece; the dig spans 20 km^{2} (7.7 sq mi) and has unearthed 300,000 individual artefacts from as early as the Roman Empire and as late as the Great Thessaloniki Fire of 1917. Ancient Thessaloniki's Decumanus Maximus was also found and 75 metres (246 ft) of the marble-paved and column-lined road were unearthed along with shops, other buildings, and plumbing, prompting one scholar to describe the discovery as "the Byzantine Pompeii". Some of the artefacts will be put on display inside the metro stations, while Venizelou will feature the world's first open archaeological site located within a metro station.

=== Festivals ===
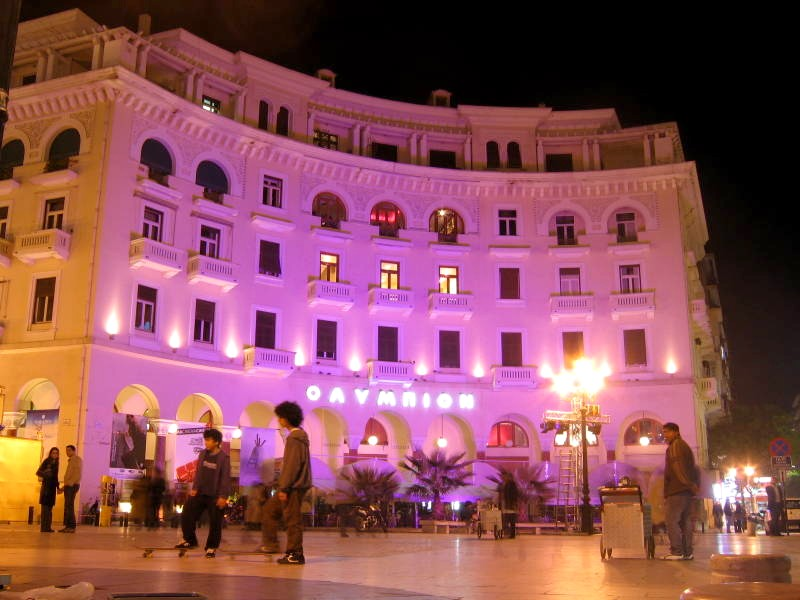
Olympion Theatre, seat of the International Film Festival

Thessaloniki is home of a number of festivals and events. The Thessaloniki International Fair is the most important event to be hosted in the city annually, by means of economic development. It was first established in 1926 and takes place every year at the 180,000 m^{2} (1,900,000 ft^{2}) Thessaloniki International Exhibition Centre. The event attracts major political attention and it is customary for the Prime Minister of Greece to outline his administration's policies for the next year during the event. Over 250,000 visitors attended the exposition in 2010. The new Art Thessaloniki, is starting first time 29.10. – 1 November 2015 as an international contemporary art fair. The Thessaloniki International Film Festival is established as one of the most important film festivals in Southern Europe, with a number of notable filmmakers such as Francis Ford Coppola, Faye Dunaway, Catherine Deneuve, Irene Papas and Fatih Akın taking part, and was established in 1960. The Documentary Festival, founded in 1999, has focused on documentaries that explore global social and cultural developments, with many of the films presented being candidates for FIPRESCI and Audience Awards.

The Dimitria festival, founded in 1966 and named after the city's patron saint of St. Demetrius, has focused on a wide range of events including music, theatre, dance, local happenings, and exhibitions. The DMC DJ Championship has been hosted at the International Trade Fair of Thessaloniki, has become a worldwide event for aspiring DJs and turntablists. The International Festival of Photography has taken place every February to mid-April. Exhibitions for the event are sited in museums, heritage landmarks, galleries, bookshops and cafés. Thessaloniki also holds an annual International Book Fair.

Between 1962–1997 and 2005–2008, the city also hosted the Thessaloniki Song Festival, Greece's most important music festival, at Alexandreio Melathron.

In 2012, the city hosted its first pride parade, Thessaloniki Pride, which took place between 22 and 23 June. It has been held every year ever since, however in 2013 transgender people participating in the parade became victims of police brutality. The issue was soon settled by the government. The city's Greek Orthodox Church leadership has consistently rallied against the event, but mayor Boutaris sided with Thessaloniki Pride, with Thessaloniki also hosting EuroPride in 2024. Since 1998, the city host Thessaloniki International G.L.A.D. Film Festival, the first LGBT film festival in Greece.

=== Sports ===
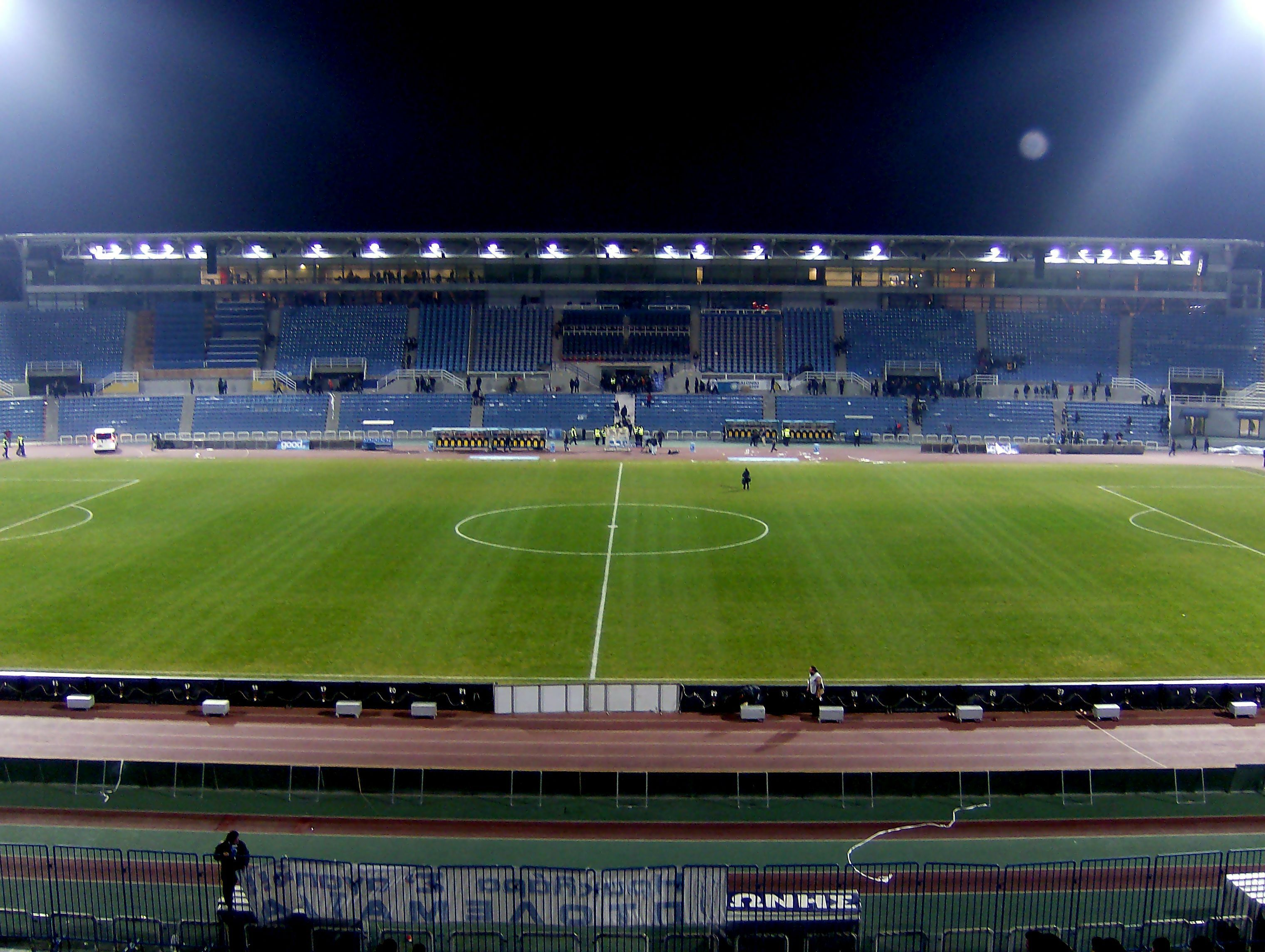
Kaftanzoglio National Stadium

The main stadium of the city is the Kaftanzoglio National Stadium (also home ground of Iraklis F.C.) constructed by donating funds of Thessalonian Jurist, Diplomat and Filanthropist Lysimachos Kaftantzoglou, while other main stadiums of the city include the football Toumba Stadium and Kleanthis Vikelidis Stadium home grounds of PAOK FC and Aris F.C., respectively, all of whom are founding members of the Greek league.

Being the largest "multi-sport" stadium in the city and in Greece until the construction of the Olympic Stadium “ Spìros Louis ” in Athens, Kaftanzoglio Stadium regularly plays host to athletics events; such as the European Athletics Association event "Olympic Meeting Thessaloniki" every year; it has hosted the National Greek Cup in 2009 and has been used for athletics at the Mediterranean Games and for the European Cup in athletics. In 2004, the stadium served as an official Athens 2004 venue, while in 2009 the city and the stadium hosted the 2009 IAAF World Athletics Final.

Thessaloniki's major indoor arenas include the state-owned Alexandreio Melathron, officially known as Nikos Galis Hall, commemorating Nikos (Nick) Galis, the greatest Greek basketball player, and P.A.O.K. Sports Arena in the urban area of Kalamarià, home of the omonymous basketball team and venue of numerous music concerts, events and festivals, as well the YMCA (Youth Men's Christian Association) indoor hall. Other sporting clubs in the city include Apollon Kalamarias based in Kalamaria, Agrotikos Asteras F.C. based in Evosmos and YMCA. Thessaloniki has a rich sporting history with its teams winning the first ever panhellenic football championship (Aris FC), basketball (Iraklis BC), and water polo (AC Aris) tournaments.

PAOK FC has emerged as the strongest football club of the city, winning the Greek championship without a defeat (2018–19 season), as well as 2023–24 season.

The city played a major role in the development of basketball in Greece. The local YMCA was the first to introduce the sport to the country, while Iraklis B.C. won the first ever Greek championship. From 1982 to 1993 Aris B.C. dominated the league, regularly finishing in first place. In that period Aris won a total of 9 championships, 7 cups and one European Cup Winners' Cup. The city also hosted the 2003 FIBA Under-19 World Championship in which Greece came third. In volleyball, Iraklis has emerged since 2000 as one of the most successful teams in Greece and Europe – see 2005–06 CEV Champions League. In October 2007, Thessaloniki also played host to the first Southeastern European Games.

The city is also the finish point of the annual Alexander The Great Marathon, which starts at Pella, in recognition of its Ancient Macedonian heritage. There are also aquatic and athletic complexes such as Ethniko and Poseidonio.

Main sports clubs in Thessaloniki
Club	Founded	Venue	Capacity	Notes
GS Iraklis	1908 (originally as Macedonikos Gymnasticos Syllogos)	Kaftanzoglio National Stadium	27,770	
GS Iraklis	1908 (originally as Macedonikos Gymnasticos Syllogos)	Ivanofeio Indoor Hall		Panhellenic titles in football, basketball, rugby, volleyball. Volleyball Champions League finalists (3 times)
Maccabi Thessaloniki	1908			Historically representative of the Jewish community. Today members of any religious faith
AC Aris Thessaloniki	1914	Kleanthis Vikelidis Stadium	22,800	
AC Aris Thessaloniki	1914	Alexandreio Melathron (Palais des Sports)	5,500	Panhellenic titles in football, basketball, volleyball, waterpolo. Three European Cups in basketball
YMCA Thessaloniki (ΧΑΝΘ)	1921			Presence in A1 basketball. Major role in introduction of basketball in Greece
Megas Alexandros	1923			Presence in First Division of Football Panhellenic Championship
P.A.O.K.	1926	Toumba Stadium	28,703	
P.A.O.K.	1926	P.A.O.K. Sports Arena	10,000	Panhellenic titles in football, basketball, volleyball, handball. Two European Cups in basketball. Most time winners in women's football
Apollon Kalamarias/Pontou	1926	Kalamaria Stadium	6,500	
M.E.N.T.	1926			Presence in A1 basketball
V.A.O.	1926			Presence in A1 basketball. Panhellenic titles in handball
Makedonikos F.C.	1928	Makedonikos Stadium	8,100	Presence in first division of men's football
Agrotikos Asteras F.C.	1932	Evosmos Stadium		
Aias Evosmou	1967	DAK Evosmou		

=== Media ===
Thessaloniki is home to the ERT3 TV-channel and Radio Macedonia, both services of public owned–Hellenic Broadcasting Corporation (ERT) operating in the city and broadcasting all over Greece. The municipality of Thessaloniki also owns and operates three radio stations, namely FM100, FM101 and FM100.6; and TV100, a television network which was also the first non-state-owned TV station in Greece and opened in 1988. Several private TV-networks also broadcast out from Thessaloniki, with Makedonia TV being the most popular.

The city's main newspapers and some of the most circulated in Greece, include Makedonia, which was also the first newspaper published in Thessaloniki in 1911 and Aggelioforos. A large number of radio stations also broadcast from Thessaloniki as the city is known for its music contributions.

==== TV broadcasting ====
- 4E TV (Panhellenic)
- ERT3 (Panhellenic broadcasting)
- Makedonia TV (Panhellenic)
- Pontos TV (Regional)
- TV 100 (Regional)

==== Press ====
- Makedonia (national publication)

=== Notable Thessalonians ===
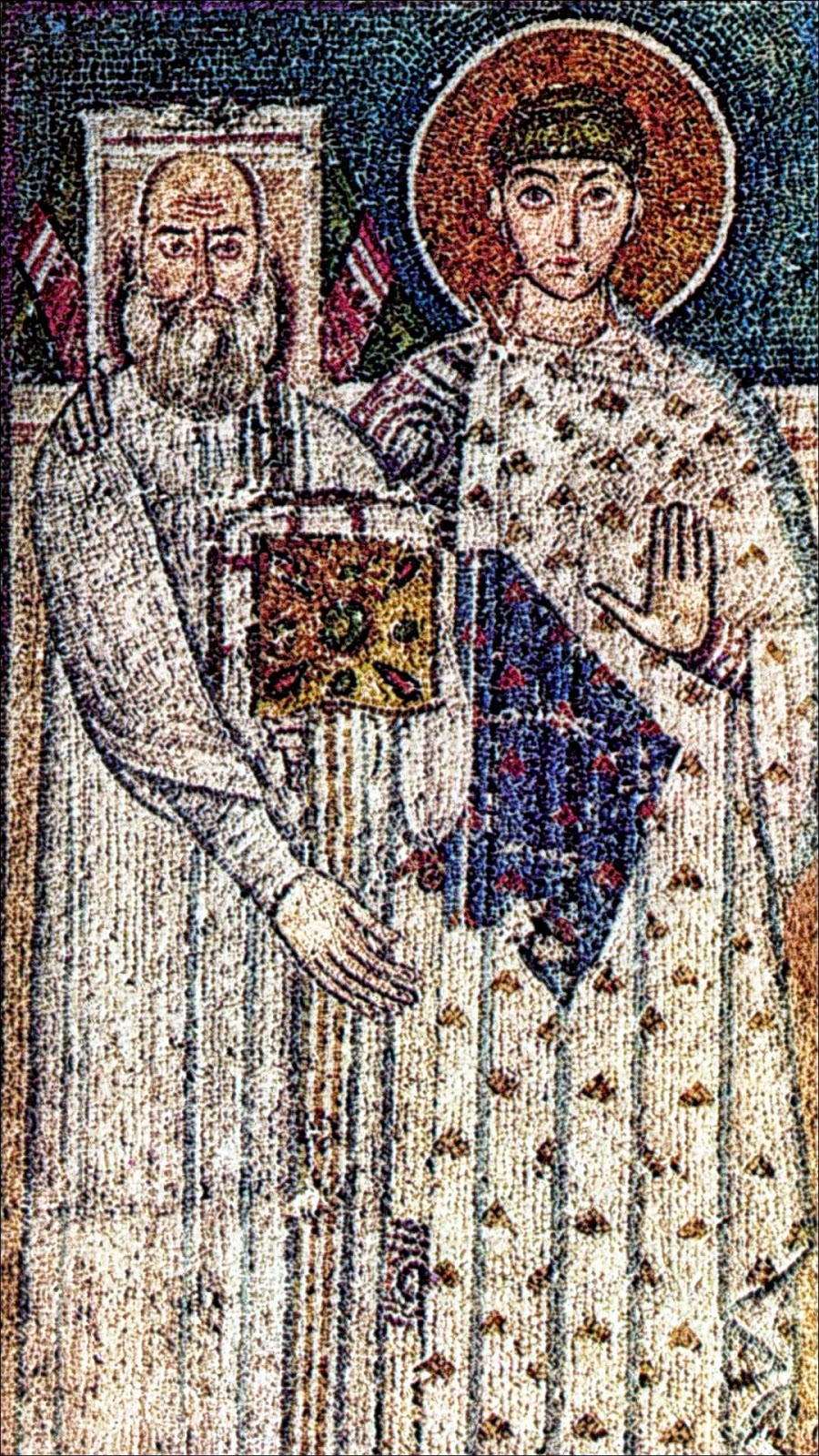
Mosaic of Saint Demetrius of Thessaloniki in the Church of Saint Demetrius in Thessaloniki

Throughout its history, Thessaloniki has been home to a number of well-known figures and people.

==== Saints and other religious figures ====
- Saints Cyril and Methodius (creators of the first Slavic alphabet)
- Saint Demetrius of Thessaloniki
- Saint Eustathius of Thessalonica
- Patriarch Philotheus I of Constantinople
- Saint Gregorios Palamas
- Matthew Blastares
- Saint Mitre
- Saint Paìsios of Mount Athos

===== Other Byzantine-era notable people =====
- Jurist Constantine Armenopoulos
- Historians John Kaminiates, Demetrius Triclinius, Thomas Magistros
- The anti-Palamian theologians Prochoros and Demetrios Kydones
- Scholars Theodorus Gaza (Thessalonicensis) and Matthaios Kamariotis

==== Musicians and movie personalities ====
- Akrivi
- Nikolas Asimos
- Manolis Chiotis
- Giannis Dalianidis
- Alberto Eskenazi
- Costas Hajihristos
- Stella Haskil
- Giorgos Hatzinasios
- Giannis Kalatzis
- Takis Kanellopoulos
- Harry Klynn
- Stavros Kouyioumtzis
- Zoe Laskari
- Marinella
- Nikos Papazoglou
- Maria Plyta
- Antonis Remos
- Emilios Riadis
- Yvonne Sanson
- Dionysis Savvopoulos
- Paschalis Terzis
- Natassa Theodoridou
- Titos Vandis
- Kostas Voutsas
- Katia Zygouli

==== Politicians born in the city ====
- Yiannis Boutaris, twice Mayor of Thessaloniki (2011–2015/2015-2019)
- Haris Kastanidis
- Christos Sartzetakis, Prosecutor and fourth President of The Hellenic Republic (1985–1990)
- Ioannis Skandalidis
- Evangelos Venizelos, Jurist, Constitutional Law Professor, Politician and Deputy Prime Minister of Greece (2011–2015)
- Alexandros Zannas

==== Sports personalities from the city ====
- Eleni Daniilidou
- Traianos Dellas
- Panagiotis Fasoulas
- Nikos Galis
- Giannis Ioannidis
- Christos Kostis
- Giorgos Koudas
- Faidon Matthaiou
- Theodoros Pallas
- Alketas Panagoulias
- Georgios Roubanis
- Dimitris Salpingidis
- Kleanthis Vikelidis
- Nikos Zisis

==== Writers from Thessaloniki ====
- Manolis Anagnostakis
- Dinos Christianopoulos
- Kleitos Kyrou
- Rena Molho
- Kostis Moskof
- Albertos Nar
- Elias Petropoulos
- Grigorios Zalykis

==== Other notable people born in Thessaloniki ====
- Fashion designer Sero (Serovpe) Abrahamian (1949–1983)
- Architect Lysandros Kaftanzoglou
- Philanthropist and benefactor Ioannis Papafis
- Konstantinos Tsavdaridis (born 1983), professor and academic

==== International personalities ====
- Armenians
  - Jean Tatlian
- Bulgarians
  - Atanas Dalchev
- French people
  - Louis Dumont
- Italians
  - Vittorio Citterich
  - Giacomo Poselli
  - Luisa Poselli
- Jews
  - Maurice Abravanel
  - Shlomo Halevi Alkabetz
  - Salamo Arouch
  - Avraam Benaroya
  - Isaak Benrubi
  - Isaac and Daniel Carasso
  - Baron Maurice de Hirsch
  - Moshe Levy
  - Raphaël Salem
  - Baruch Uziel
- Slav Macedonians
  - Dimo Todorovski
- Spanish people
  - Juana Mordó
- Turks
  - Cahit Arf
  - Mustafa Kemal Atatürk
  - Mehmet Cavit Bey
  - Nâzım Hikmet
  - Afet İnan
  - Abdul Kerim Pasha
  - Sabiha Sertel
  - Hasan Tahsin
  - Hasan Tahsin Uzer

=== Cuisine ===
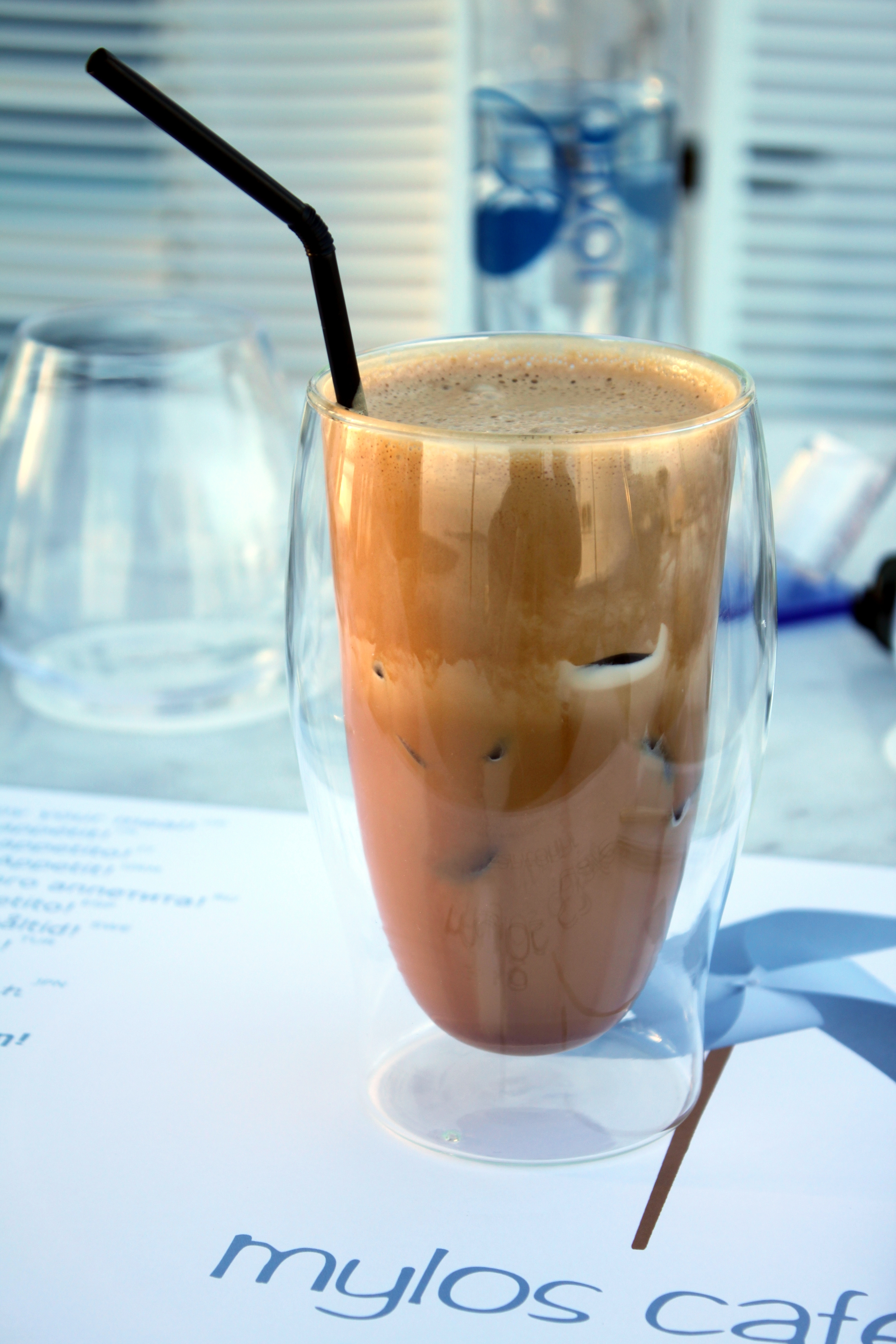
Frappé coffee

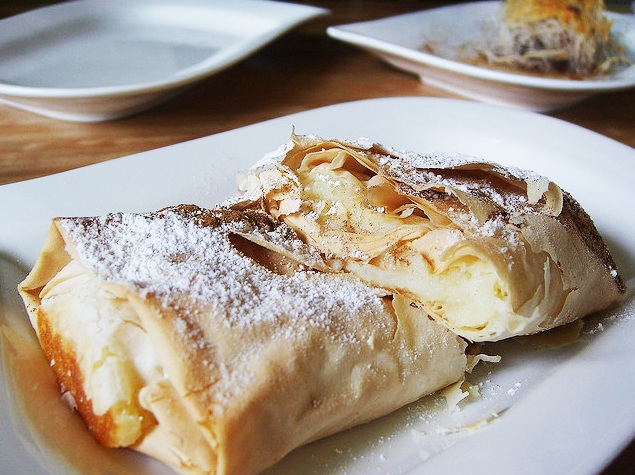
Bougatsa, typical Thessalonian treat

Because Thessaloniki remained under Ottoman rule for about 100 years longer than southern Greece, it has retained a lot of its Eastern character, including its culinary tastes. Spices in particular play an important role in the cuisine of Thessaloniki, something which is not true to the same degree about Greece's southern regions. Thessaloniki's Ladadika borough is a particularly busy area in regards to Thessalonian cuisine, with most tavernas serving traditional meze and other such culinary delights.

Bougatsa, a breakfast pastry, which can be either sweet with Patisserie créme or savory, is very popular throughout the city and has spread around other parts of Greece and the Balkans as well. Another popular snack is koulouri.

Notable sweets of the city are Trigona Panoràmatos, Roxákia, Kourkoubinia and Armenonville. A stereotypical Thessalonian coffee drink is Frappé coffee. Frappé was invented in the Thessaloniki International Fair in 1957 and has since spread throughout Greece and Cyprus to become a hallmark of the Greek coffee culture. Rather than Frappé, Thessalonians tend to enjoy drinking Freddo Espresso, a special Greek variation of Espresso coffee; specifically, after being extracted from the coffee machine, espresso is put into a shaker full of ice and eventually sugar (if preferred such) and afterwards it is frothed with an electric frother. Finally, it is served with ice and straw in a tall glass. Coffee is an inseparable part of Thessalonians, marking a quick break from work, a socialising opportunity among friends, family and couples as well as a chance to study, meet new people and relax.

Kapani or Agora Vlalì is the oldest central market in Thessaloniki, with shops selling fish, meat, vegetables, fruits, drinks, olives, sweets, nuts, spices and Modiano Market is located nearby.

=== Tourism ===
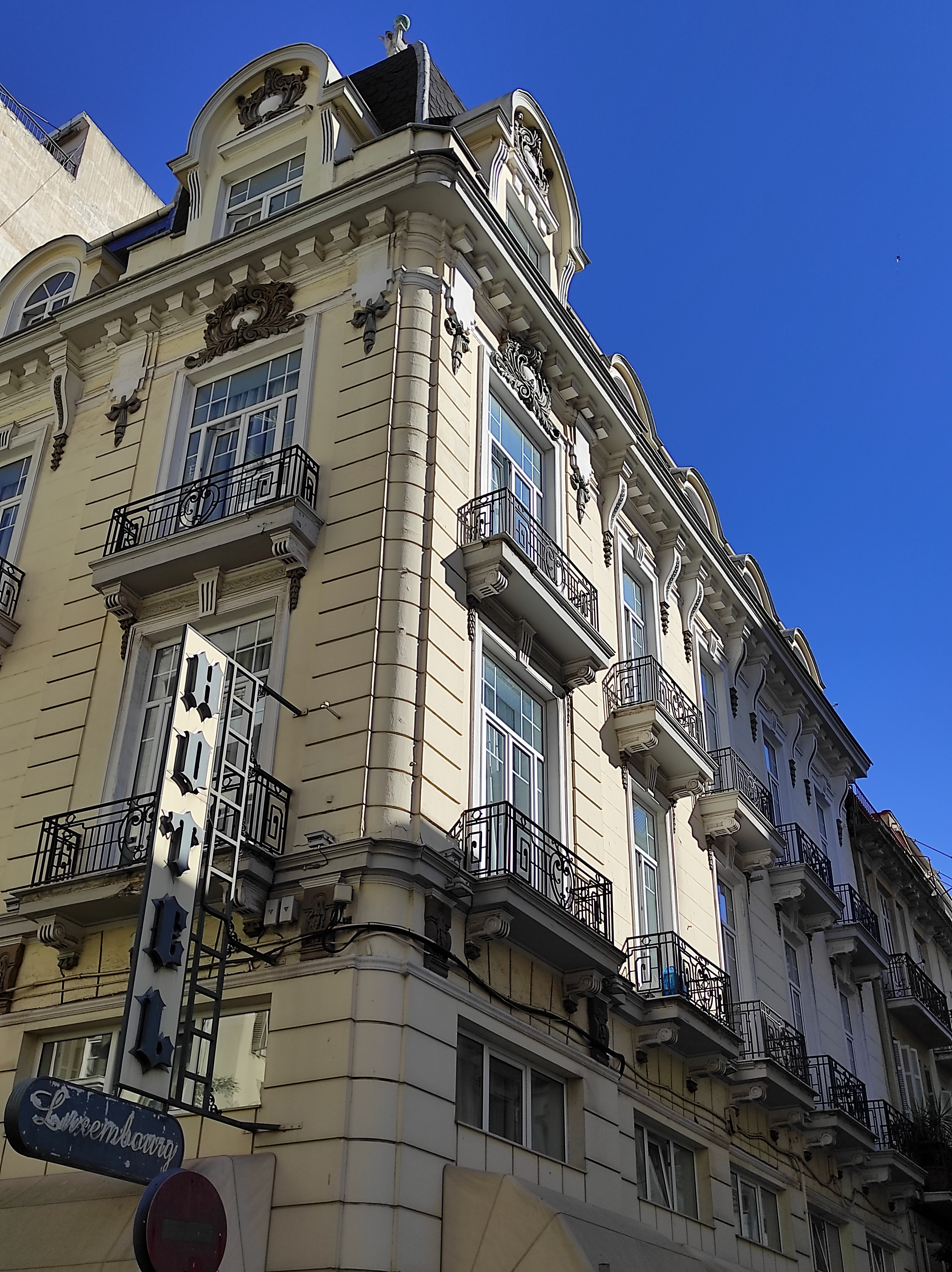
Hotel Luxemvourgo on Komninon Street (1924, arch. Eli Modiano)

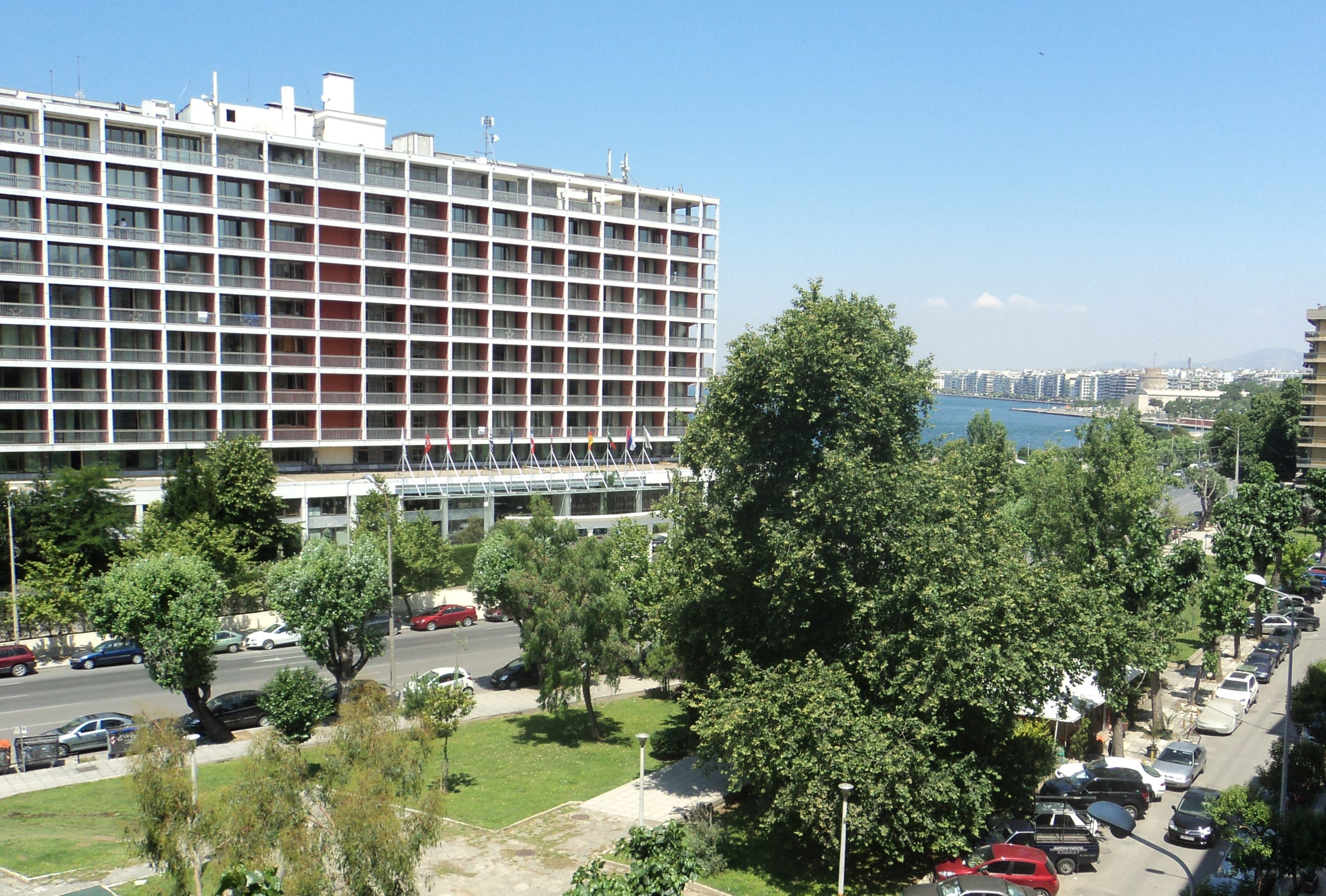
View of the Makedonia Palace on the promenade

A tourism boom took place in the 2010s, during the years of mayor Boutaris, especially from the neighboring countries, Austria, Israel and Turkey. In 2010, overnight stays of foreign tourists in the city were around 250,000. In 2018, overnight stays of foreign tourists were estimated to reach 3,000,000 people. Thessaloniki is known as "the city that never sleeps" and a "party capital" due to its thriving nightlife, young atmosphere and famous 24-hour culture.

=== Music ===
The city is viewed as a romantic one in Greece, and as such Thessaloniki is commonly featured in Greek songs. There are a number of famous songs that go by the name 'Thessaloniki' (rebetiko, laïko etc.) or include the name in their title.

During the 1930s and 1940s, the city became a centre of the Rebetiko music, partly because of the Metaxas censorship, which was stricter in Athens. Vassilis Tsitsanis wrote some of his best songs in Thessaloniki.

The city is the birthplace of significant composers in the Greek music scene, such as Manolis Chiotis, Stavros Kouyioumtzis and Dionysis Savvopoulos. It is also notable for its rock music scene and its many rock groups; some became famous such as Xylina Spathia, Trypes or the pop rock group Onirama.

Between 1962–1997 and 2005–2008, the city also hosted the Thessaloniki Song Festival. In the Eurovision Song Contest 2013 Greece was represented by Koza Mostra and Agathonas Iakovidis, both from Thessaloniki.

It should be highlighted that due to many Asia Minor and Pontian refugees from the genocide of 1923, Thessaloniki is the birthplace of many known traditional singers, such as Chrysanthos Theodoridis and lyra musician "Patriarch of Lyra" Gogos Petridis.

=== In popular culture ===
In May 1936, a massive strike by tobacco workers led to general anarchy in the city and Ioannis Metaxas (future dictator, then PM) ordered its repression. The events and the deaths of the protesters inspired poet Yiannis Ritsos to write the Epitafios.

On 22 May 1963, Grigoris Lambrakis MD, physician-doctor, pacifist and MP, was assassinated by two far-right extremists driving a three-wheeled vehicle. The event led to the political crisis as it is presumed that State Gendarmerie, Army and Government members were indirectly coinvolved, even though never officially demonstrated. Costa Gavras directed Z (1969) based on it, two years after the military junta had seized power in Greece. For his notable juridical, incorruptible and unprejudiced work regarding Lambrakis’ case, First Instance Judge Christos Sartzetakis (Thessaloniki 1929–2022) was proposed and elected at the constitutionally highest political rank, becoming President of The Hellenic Republic.

Notable films set or shot in Thessaloniki, among others, include:

- Street of Shadows (1937) by Georg Wilhelm Pabst
- The Barefooted Battalion (1954) by Gregg Tallas
- O Atsídas (1961) by Giannis Dalianidis
- Parenthesis (1968) by Takis Kanellopoulos
- Z (1969) by Costa-Gavras
- Triumph of the Spirit (1989) by Robert M. Young
- Eternity and a Day (1998) by Theo Angelopoulos
- Cloudy Sunday (2015) by Manousos Manousakis
- The Bricklayer (2023) by Renny Harlin

== Education ==
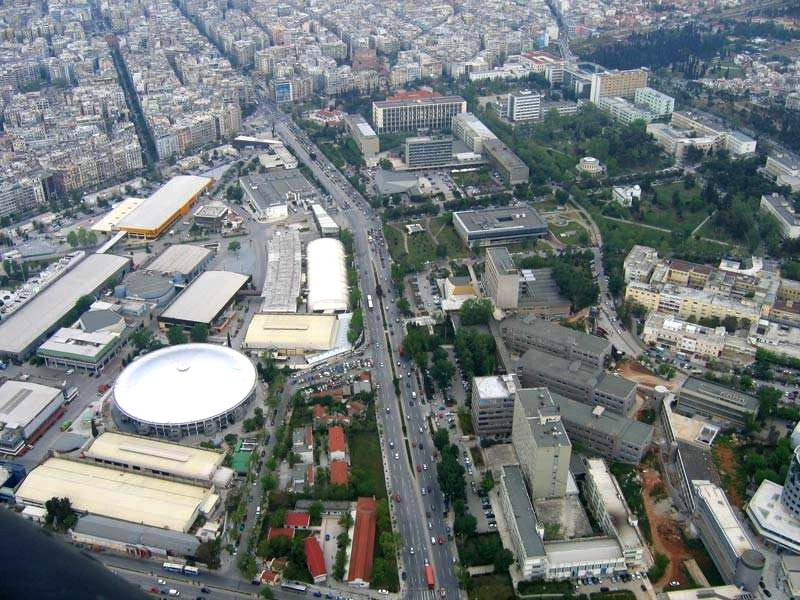
Aerial view of the campus of the Aristotle University of Thessaloniki (to the right), the largest university in Greece and the Balkans

Thessaloniki is a major centre of education for Greece. Three of the country's largest universities are located in central Thessaloniki: Aristotle University of Thessaloniki, the University of Macedonia and the International Hellenic University–ex Intermediate Technical Educating Institution “Alexandros”. Aristotle University was founded in 1926 and is currently the largest university in Greece by arithmetic enrolled students, which numbered more than 80,000 students of all degrees, classes and levels in 2010, and also a member of the Utrecht Network. For the academic year 2009–2010, Aristotle University was ranked as one of the 150 best universities in the world for arts and humanities and among the 250 best universities in the world overall by the Times QS World University Rankings, making it one of the top 2% of best universities worldwide. Leiden ranks Aristotle University as one of the top 100 European universities, at number 97, and the best university in Greece. Since 2010, Thessaloniki is also home to the Open University of Thessaloniki, which is funded by Aristotle University, the University of Macedonia and the municipality of Thessaloniki.

Numerous public and private vocational institutes (Greek: IEK) provide professional non-accademica training to young students, while a large number of private colleges offer American and UK academic curriculum and titles, via cooperation with foreign universities. In addition to Greek students, the city hence attracts many foreign students either via the Erasmus programme for public universities, or for a complete degree in public universities or in the city's private colleges. As of 2006 the city's total student population was estimated around 200,000.

== Transport ==
=== Tram ===
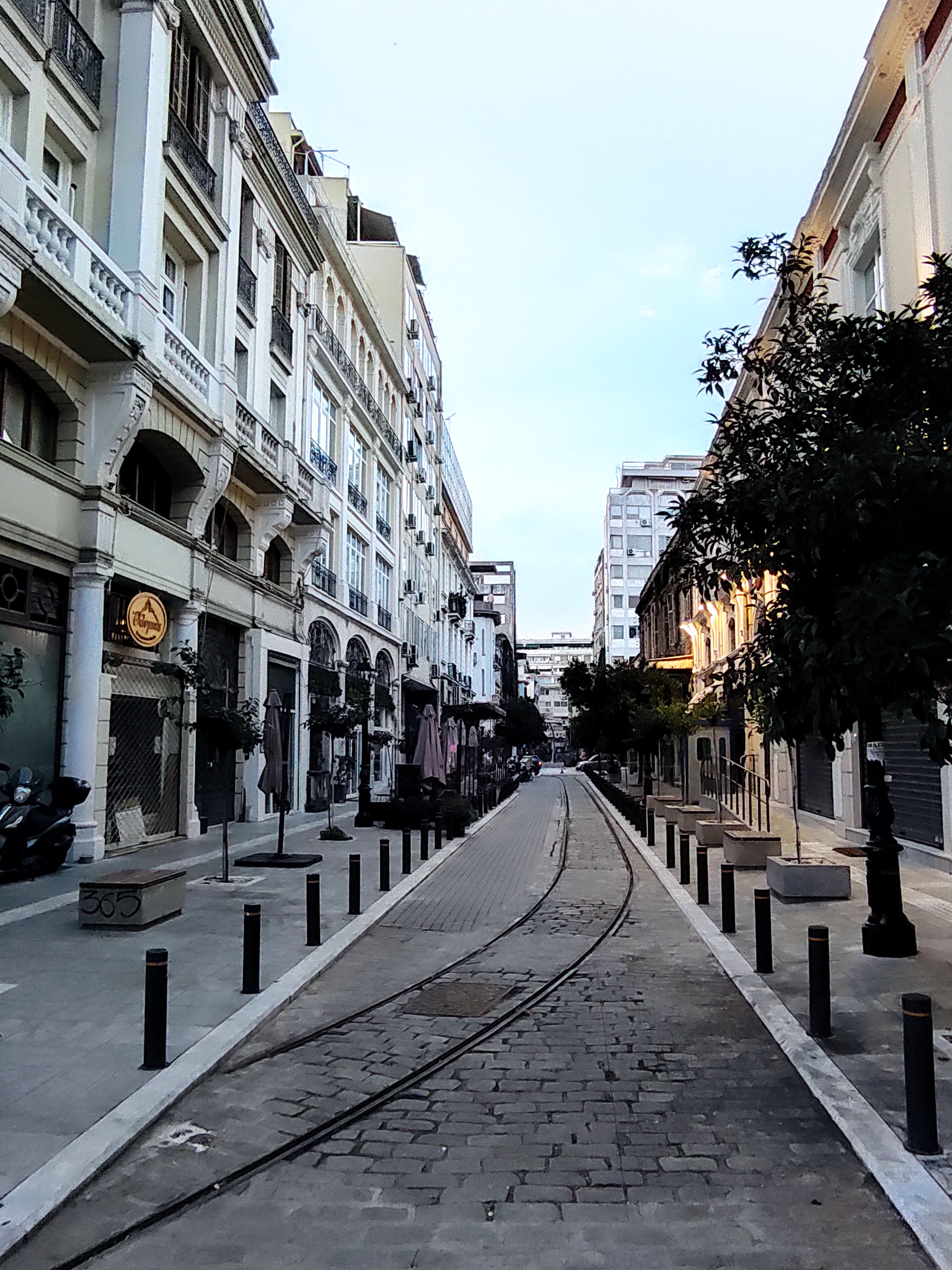
The old tram lines on Agiou Mina Street

Tram was the main, oldest and most popular public urban mean of Thessalonians in the past. It was in operation from 1893 to 1957, when it was disestablished by the government of Konstantinos Karamanlis. The Belgian Compagnie de Tramways et d' Éclairage Électrique de Salonique operated it from 1912 until 1940, when the company was purchased by the Hellenic State. The operating base and tram station was in the district of Dépôt.

Before the economic crisis of 2009, there were various proposals for new tram lines.

=== Bus ===
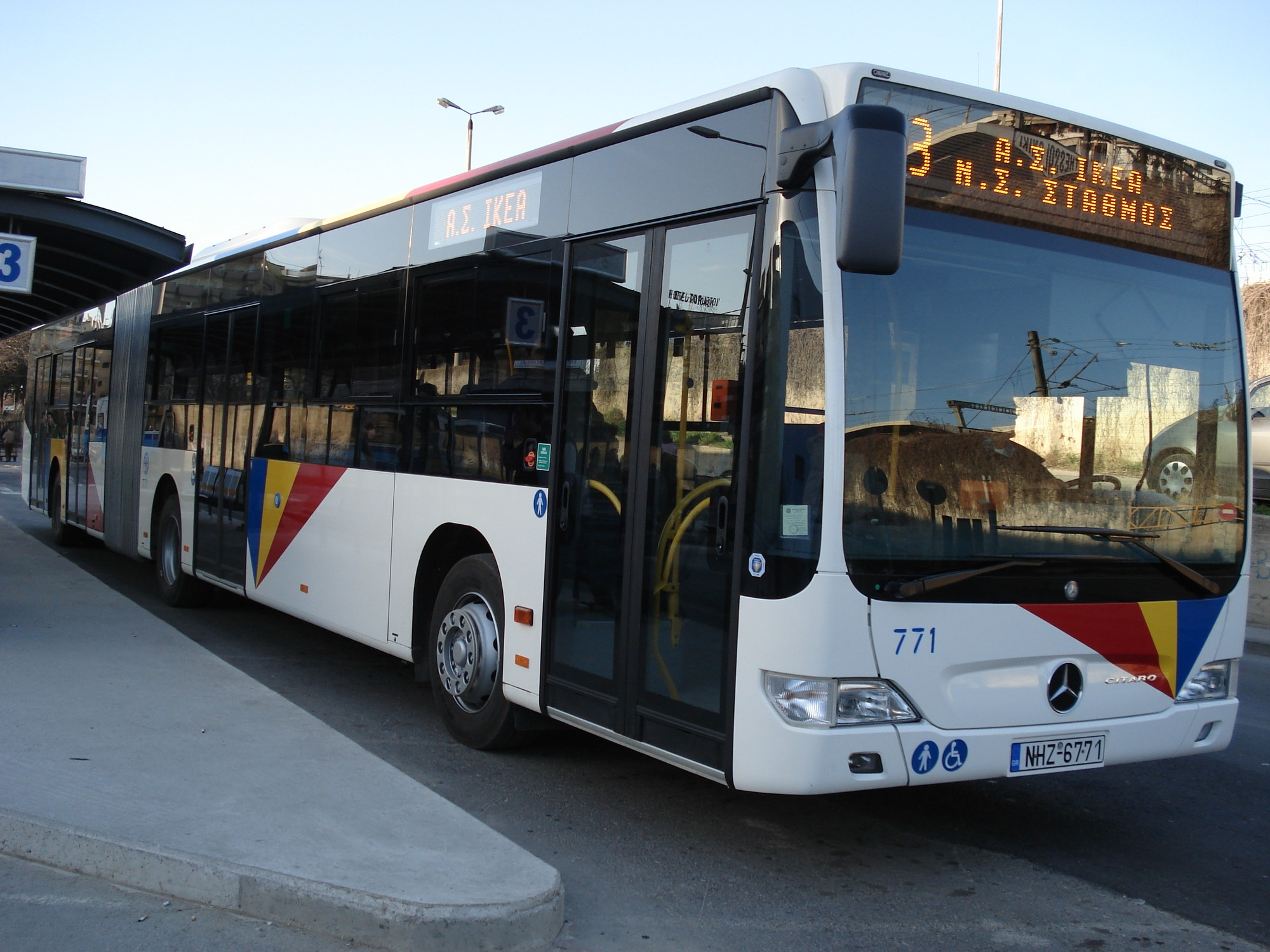
An OASTH bus

Thessaloniki Urban Transport Organization (OASTH) operates public transport buses in Thessaloniki. It was founded in 1957 and operates a fleet of 604 vehicles on 75 routes throughout the Thessaloniki metropolitan area. International and regional bus links are provided by KTEL at its “Macedonia” Extraurban Bus Terminal, located to the west of the city centre.

=== Metro ===
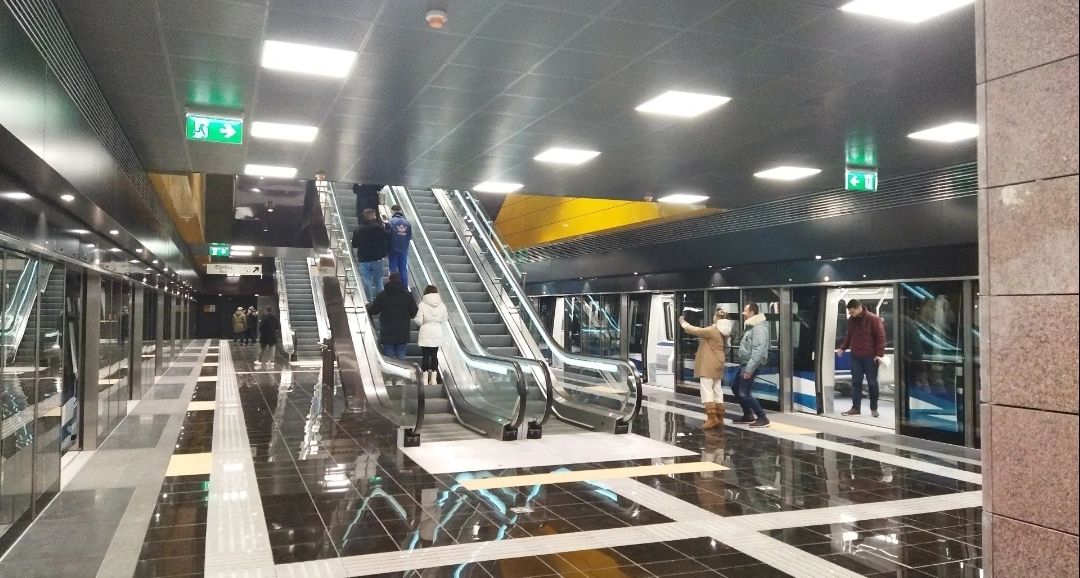
Agias Sofias metro station

The creation of a metro system for Thessaloniki goes back as far as 1918, when Thomas Hayton Mawson and Ernest Hébrard proposed the creation of a Thessaloniki Metropolitan Railway. In 1968, a circular metro line was proposed, and in 1987 the first serious proposal was presented and construction briefly started in 1988, before stalling and finally being abandoned due to lack of funding. Both the 1918 and 1988 proposals ran almost the identical route to the current Line 1.

Construction of Thessaloniki metro began in 2006 and is classified as a megaproject: it has a budget of €1.57 billion ($1.77 billion). Line 1 began operation on 30 November 2024, while Line 2 entered service on 27 August 2026. Line 1 is 9.5 kilometres (5.9 mi) long and includes 13 stations, while Line 2 is 4.8 kilometres (3.0 mi) long and includes a further five stations, while also crossing 11 of the 13 Line 1 stations. Important archaeological discoveries have been made during construction, and some of the system's stations house archaeological exhibitions. One station in particular, that of Venizelou, houses the only archaeological site within a metro station in the world.

Line 2 is to be expanded further to the northwestern suburbs of the city, towards Evosmos and Stavroupoli, and to the east, towards the Airport. The northwestern extension is a priority, as the airport is served by bus to the terminus of Line 1.

It is now expected that 320,000 people per day and 116 million people per year will use the Thessaloniki metro.

=== Commuter/suburban rail (Proastiakos) ===
Suburban Railway services

Commuter intraregional rail services have recently been established between Thessaloniki and the city of Larissa (the service is known in Greek as the "Proastiakos", meaning "Suburban Railway"). The service is operated using Siemens Desiro EMU trains on a modernised electrified double track and stops at 11 restructured rail stations, covering the journey in 1 hour and 33 minutes. Furthermore, an additional line has also been established, with the use of regional trains, connecting Thessaloniki to Edessa and Florina.

=== Thessaloniki Airport "Makedonia" ===
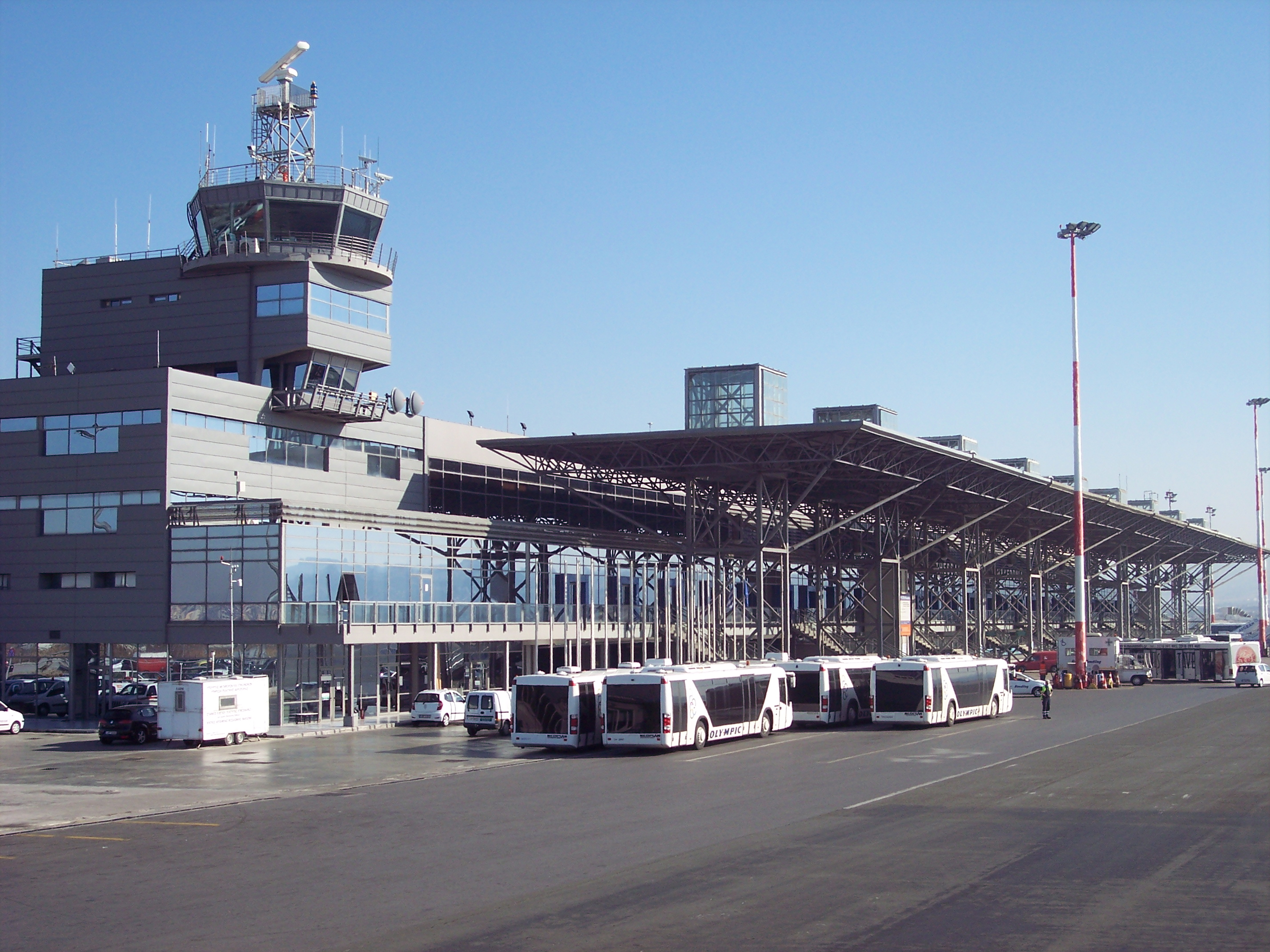
Thessaloniki International Airport

International and domestic air traffic to and from the city of Thessaloniki is served by the "Makedonia" International Airport of Thessaloniki. The short length of the airport's two runways means that it does not, yet, support intercontinental flights; however, a major extension of one of its runways into the Thermaic Gulf is currently under construction. Following the completion of the runway works, the airport will be able to serve intercontinental flights and cater for larger aircraft in the future. After long delays, the new runway of the airport was completed in spring 2019. Construction of a second new terminal began in September 2018. New T2 has been finished in February 2021, three months ahead of schedule.

=== Railways ===
The Thessaloniki railway station features a central hall with a shopping centre within a 1960s era building. The station has staffed ticketing services, a large climate-controlled waiting room, café bar, fast-food restaurants, kiosk and luggage lockers. On the platforms, cover seating is available and the station is alongside a bus terminal. The station is connected by bus and the Metro with much of the urban area of Thessaloniki, including other major transport centres such as the Macedonia InterCity Bus Terminal (KTEL), the port and Macedonia International Airport.

Regional train services within Greece (operated by TrainOSE, the Hellenic Railways Organization's train operating company), link the city with other main urban parts of the country's territory, indicatively Athens, Larissa, Katerìni, Edessa, Véria, Florina, Serres, Alexandroupoli, Orestiada, Drama, Xànthi, Meteora and more. Once there were abundant international links serving different European and Balkan cities and also remarkable trains such as Orient Express, Acropolis Express, Hellas Express, Eurocity ecc. namely; Sofia, Belgrade, Skopje, Vienna, Budapest, Bucharest, Istanbul and most importantly diverse German cities.

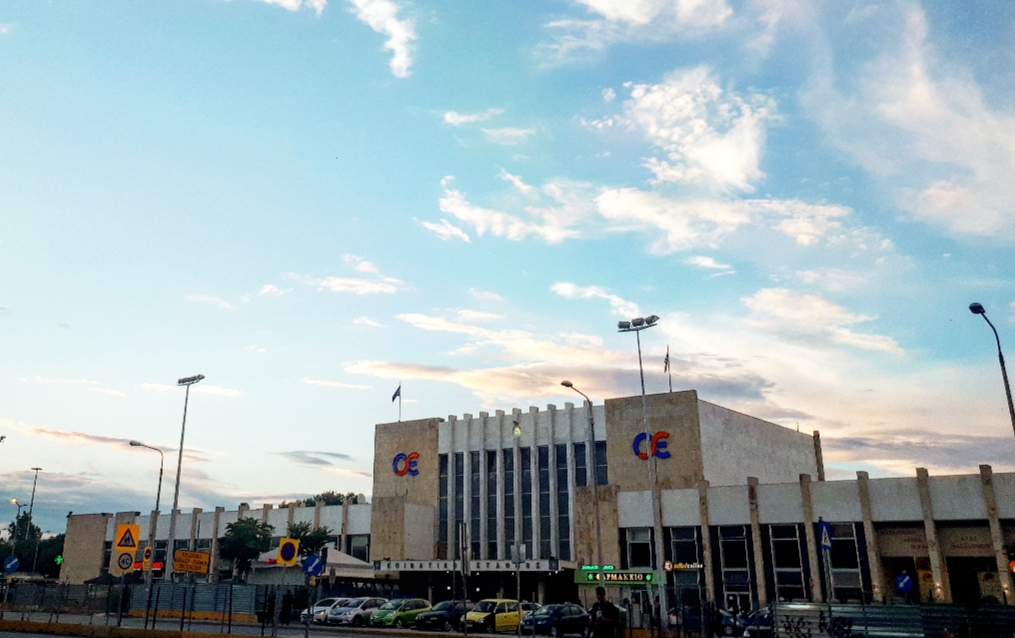
New railway station

Due to the Greek economic crisis, all international train links from the city were suspended in February 2011. Until then, the city was a major railway hub for the Balkans and Eastern Europe. Daily through trains to Sofia (via Serres) and Belgrade (via Gevgelija) were restarted in May 2014 but stopped again due to COVID-19 restrictions. Nevertheless, Thessaloniki remains a key passenger and merchant railway hub with the biggest marshalling yard in the country and still one of the biggest in Balkans.

=== Port ===
The Port of Thessaloniki connects the city with seasonal ferries to the Sporades, other north Aegean islands and Turkish Minor Asia's ports like Izmir/Smyrni, with its passenger terminal being one of the largest in the Aegean Sea basin; having handled around 162,731 passengers in 2007. Meanwhile, ongoing actions have been going on for more connections and the port is recently being upgraded, as Thessaloniki is also slowly turning into a major tourist port for cruising in the eastern Mediterranean. It also consists the second largest port of Greece by merchant traffic volume being only behind Piraeus Port, the largest domestic port.

=== Motorways ===
Road map of Thessaloniki and its suburbs from OpenStreetMap

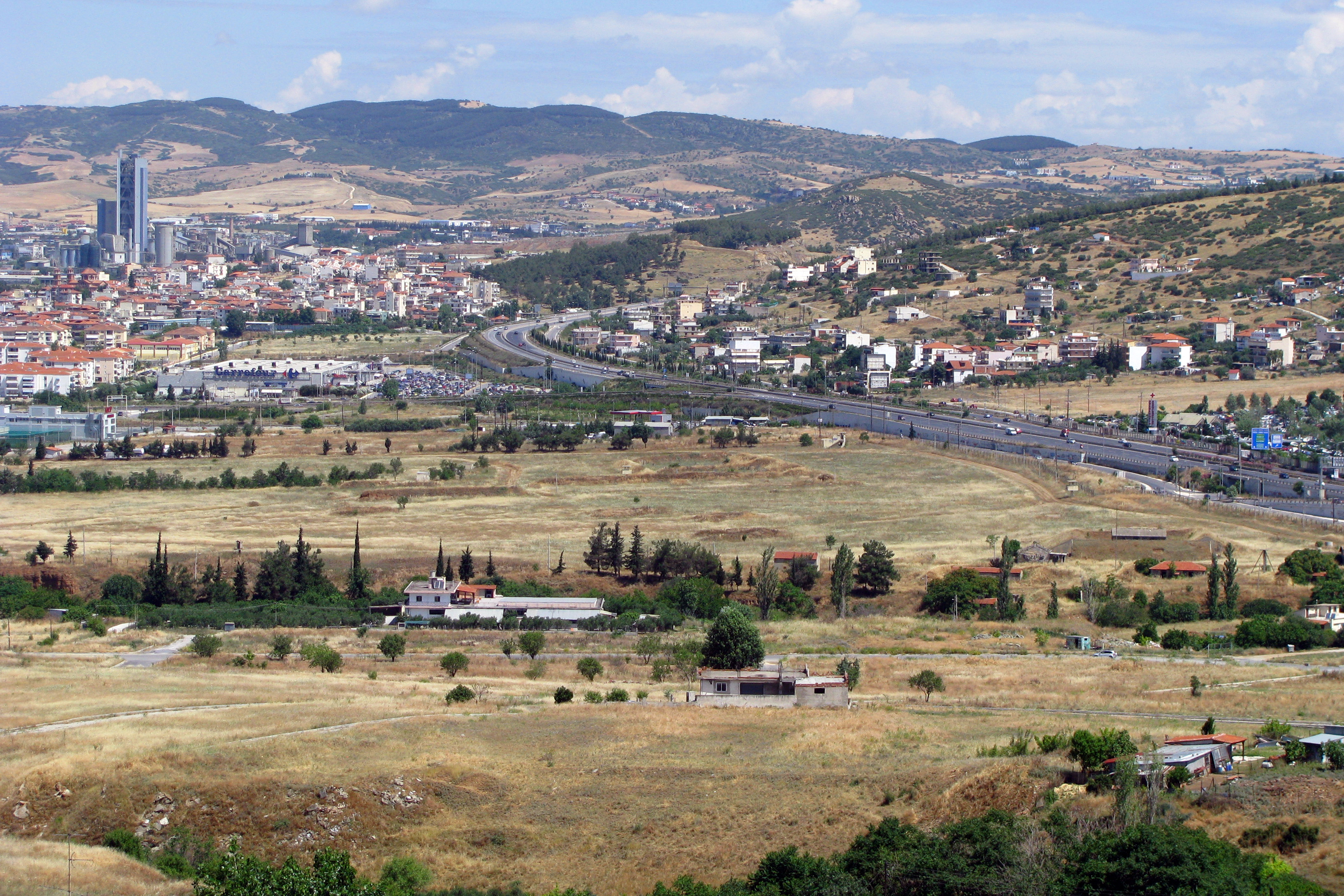
Part of the ring road (Peripheriaki Odos)

Thessaloniki lies on the crossroads of the A1/E75, A2/E90 and A25 motorways; which connect the city with other parts of the country, as well as the neighbouring countries of North Macedonia, Bulgaria and Turkey.

The city itself is bypassed by the C-shaped Thessaloniki Inner Ring Road (Esoteriki Peripheriaki Odos, Greek: Εσωτερική Περιφεριακή Οδός), which all of the above motorways connect onto it. The western end of the route begins at the junction with the A1/A2 motorways in Lachanagora District. Clockwise it heads northeast around the city, passing through the northwestern suburbs, the forest of Seich Sou and through to the southeast suburb/borough of Kalamaria. The ring road ends at a large junction with the A24 motorway, which then continues south to Chalkidiki, passing through Thessaloniki's outer southeast suburbs.

The speed limit on this motorway is 90 kilometres per hour (56 mph); it currently has three traffic lanes for each direction and forms the city's most vital road link; handling more than 120,000 vehicles daily, instead of the 30,000 vehicles that it was originally designed to handle in 1975. An outer ring road known as Eksoteriki Peripheriaki Odos (Greek: Εξωτερική Περιφεριακή Οδός, outer ring road) carries all traffic that completely bypasses the city. It is part of A2 motorway.

==== Future plans ====
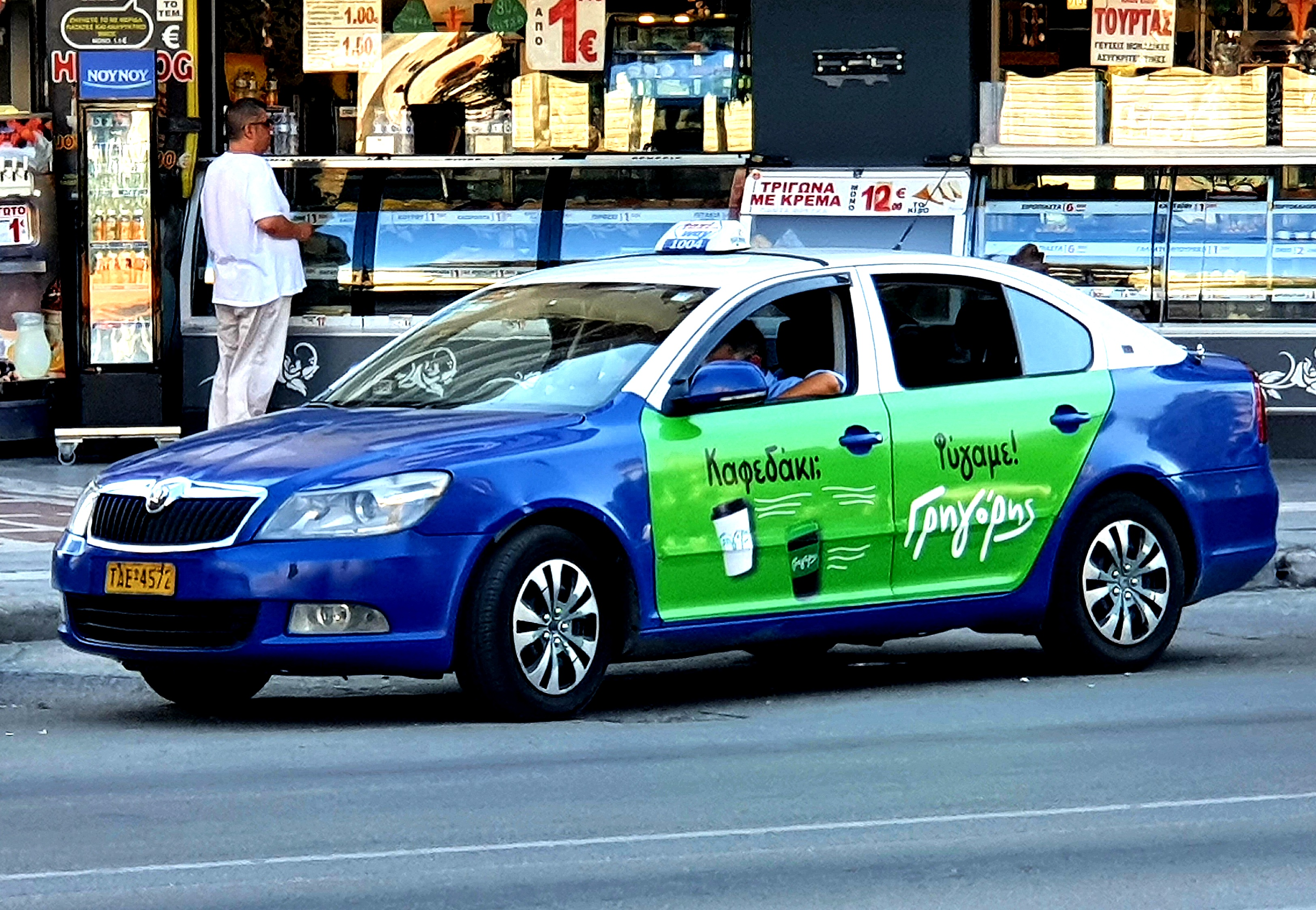
Taxi in Thessaloniki

Despite the large effort that was made in 2004 to improve the motorway features of the Thessaloniki ring road, the motorway is still insufficient to handle Thessaloniki's increasing traffic and metropolitan population. To tackle this problem, the government has introduced large scale redevelopment plans throughout 2011 with tenders expected to be announced within early 2012; that include the total restructuring of the A16 in the western side of the city, with new junctions and new emergency lanes throughout the whole length of the motorway. In the eastern side an even larger scale project has been announced, for the construction of a new elevated motorway section above the existing, which would allow faster travel for drivers heading to the airport and Chalkidiki that do not wish to exit into the city, decongesting the existing motorway for city commuters. The plans also include adding one more lane in each direction on the existing A16 ring road and on the A24 passing through Thessaloniki's southeast suburbs, from its junction with the A16 in Kalamaria, up to the airport exit (ΕΟ67); which will make it an 8 lane highway.

Additional long-term plans include the extension of the planned outer ring road known as Eksoteriki Peripheriaki Odos (Greek: Εξωτερική Περιφεριακή Οδός, outer ring road) to circle around the entirety of the Thessaloniki metropolitan area, crossing over the Thermaic Gulf from the east, to join with the A1/E75 motorway. Preliminary plans have been announced which include a 4.5 km (3 mi) bridge over the gulf, as part of the southern bypass of the city; to cater for the large number of travellers from Macedonia and the rest of Greece heading to the airport, and to the increasingly popular tourist region of Chalkidiki.

- Motorways:
  - A1/E75 W (Republic of North Macedonia, Larissa, Athens)
  - A2/E90 W (Kozani, Ioannina, Igoumenitsa) N (Kavala, Xanthi, Alexandroupolis, Turkey)
  - A25 (ΕΟ12)/Ε79 Ν (Serres, Bulgaria)
  - A24 (ΕΟ67) S (Airport, Chalkidiki)
- National Roads:
  - ΕΟ2/Ε86 W (Edessa, Giannitsa)
  - ΕΟ12/Ε79 Ν (Serres, Drama)
  - ΕΟ16, SW (Polygyros, Ouranopolis)
  - ΕΟ65, Ν (Kilkis, Doirani)

Thessaloniki is also planned to be the southern terminus of the trans-European Via Carpathia motorway.

== International relations ==
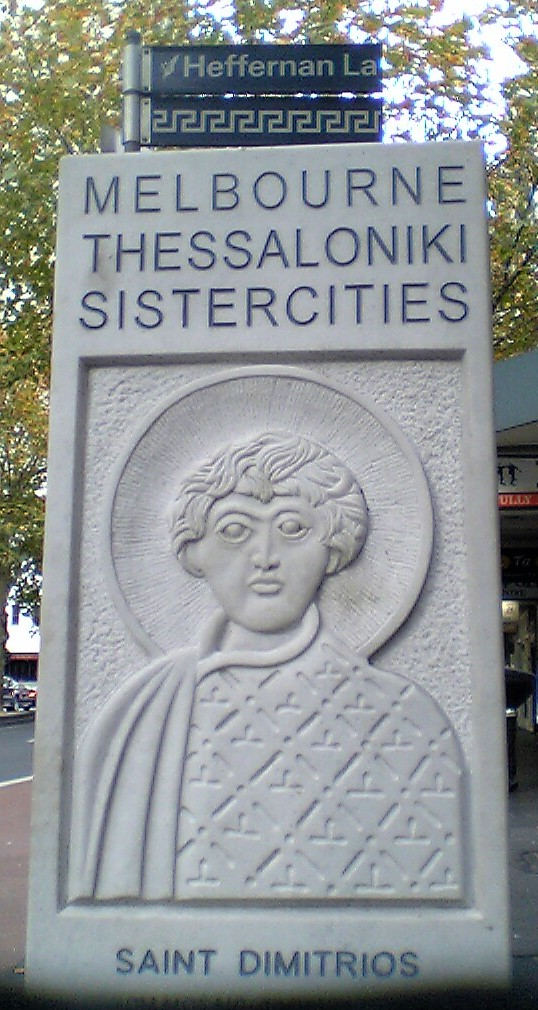
Commemorative stele in Melbourne

Consulates

- Albania
- Austria
- Australia
- Belgium
- Brazil
- Bulgaria
- Georgia
- Canada
- Croatia
- China
- Cyprus
- Denmark
- Finland
- France
- Germany
- Hungary
- Israel
- Ireland
- Italy
- Jordan
- Lithuania
- Netherlands
- North Macedonia
- Norway
- Poland
- Portugal
- Serbia
- Spain
- Switzerland
- Sweden
- United States
- United Kingdom
- Ukraine
- Romania
- Russia
- Turkey

=== Twin towns – sister cities ===
Thessaloniki is twinned with:

- Hartford, United States (1962)
- Alexandria, Egypt (1993)
- Bologna, Italy (1984)
- Leipzig, Germany (1984)
- Limassol, Cyprus (1984)
- Melbourne, Australia (1984)
- Plovdiv, Bulgaria (1984)
- Bratislava, Slovakia (1986)
- Cologne, Germany (1988)
- Constanţa, Romania (1988)
- San Francisco, United States (1990)
- Nice, France (1992)
- Tel Aviv, Israel (1994)
- Kolkata, India (2005)
- Korçë, Albania (2005)
- Busan, South Korea (2010)
- Durrës, Albania (2012)

=== Other cooperation ===
Thessaloniki also cooperates with:

- Toronto, Canada (1986)
- Budapest, Hungary (1993)
- Brooklyn (New York), United States (1993)
- Boston, United States (1996)
- Shenyang, China (2000)
- Gyumri, Armenia (2000)
- Philadelphia, United States (2002)
- Saint Petersburg, Russia (2002)
- Dnipro, Ukraine (2003)
- Venice, Italy (2003)
- Dongguan, China (2008)
- Nagoya, Japan (2019)

== See also ==
- Battle of Thessalonica (fourteen events at various times)
- Macedonians (Greeks)
- Mount Chortiatis, above the city
- Lake Koroneia, 14 km from the city
- Vergina, town near Aigai, the first capital of Macedon
- List of ancient Greek cities
- Delta of Axios National Park, west of the city
- Ancient Macedonian dialect
- Makedones
