= Villa Allatini =

Building in Thessaloniki, Greece

Coordinates: 40.5929°N 22.9557°E

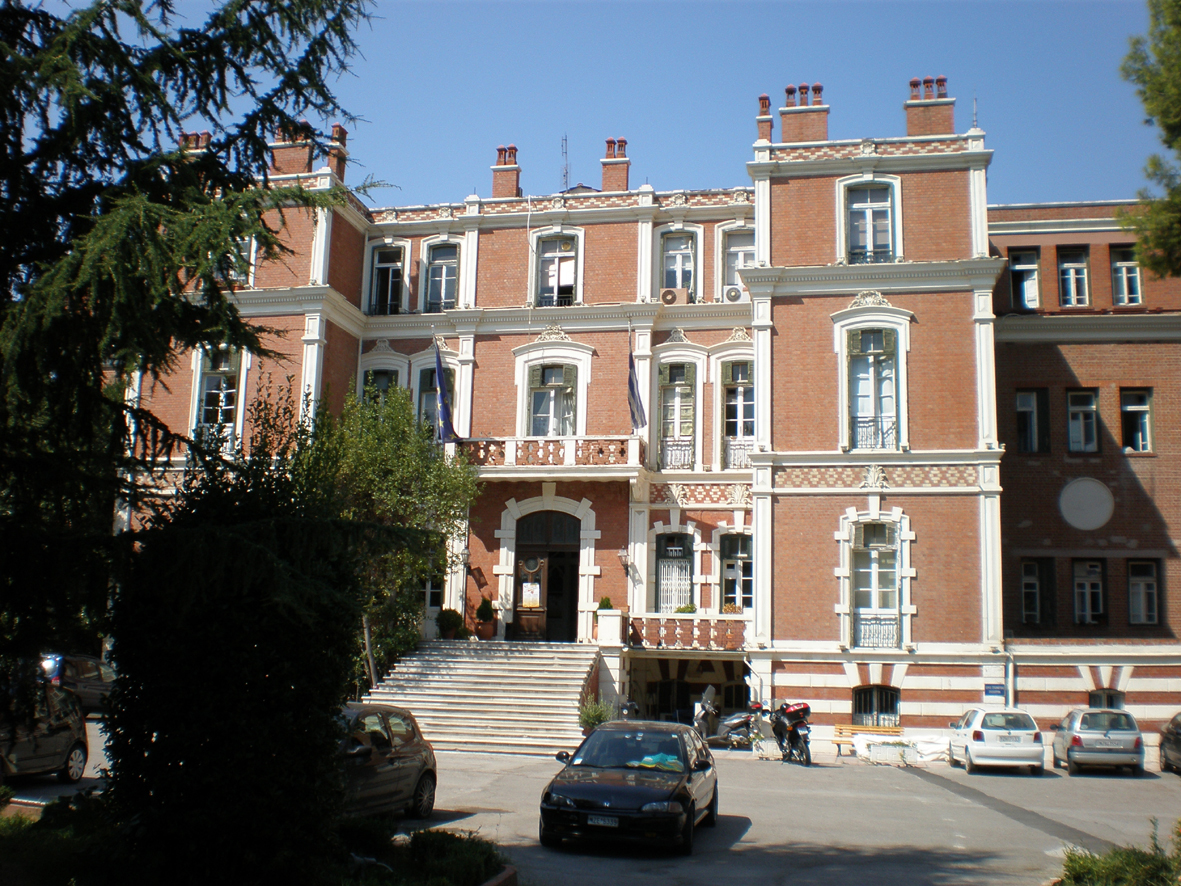
Villa Allatini today

Villa Allatini (Greek: Βίλλα Αλλατίνι) is a three-storey baroque building on Vasilissis Olgas Avenue in the area of Depot in the east of the Municipality of Thessaloniki, Greece. It was constructed in 1898 when Thessaloniki was part of the Ottoman Empire.

== History ==
It was built in 1898 by the Italian architect Vitaliano Poselli, who also designed the Mills of Allatini that were founded in 1890, and the head office of Allatini-affiliated Banque de Salonique in downtown Thessaloniki. At that time the region where the villa is located was called the district of "Countrysides" (des Campagnes) or "Towers", and was the easternmost limit of Thessaloniki.

In the first period of its use, the villa was the countryside residence of the Salonica Jewish Allatini family. After the emergence of the Young Turks movement, from 1909 until 1911 it was used as the residence of the sultan Abdul Hamid II, who after his unseating by the Young Turks lived there under house arrest. In 1926 it housed the Philosophical School for one year, the unique department of the newly founded University of Thessaloniki, while during the Greco-Italian War (1940-1941) it was used as a hospital.

From 1979 the Prefecture of Thessaloniki had its headquarters in Villa Allatini. In 2011 after the implementation of the Kallikratis Plan, the prefecture was abolished and replaced by regional self-governing bodies. Today Villa Allatini houses the administration of the region of Central Macedonia.

== See also ==
- Allatini (company)
- Allatini Mills
- Banque de Salonique
