= Ecumenical Hellenism (program) =

The seal of Ecumenical Hellenism.

The Ecumenical Hellenism program (Greek: Πρόγραμμα Οικουμενικός Ελληνισμός), is a non-profit, non-governmental company. It is the result of the cooperation between the Athens-based publishing house Greek National Line (Ελληνική Εθνική Γραμμή) and the Institute for National and Religious Studies of Thessaloniki.

The program started its function in 1996, as a result of the initiative of the businessman Stavros Panousopoulos and of the Aristotle University of Thessaloniki Professor, Athanasios Angelopoulos. The aim of the Ecumenical Hellenism is to promote Greek interests abroad as well as to publish editions regarding Greek culture and Orthodoxy. The program mainly operates within the Greek diaspora.

During its function, the program organised missions all over the world and operated under the patronage of the President of the Hellenic Republic as well as under the blessing of the Ecumenical Patriarch and of the Church of Greece.
