= Athanasios Angelopoulos =

Greek academic

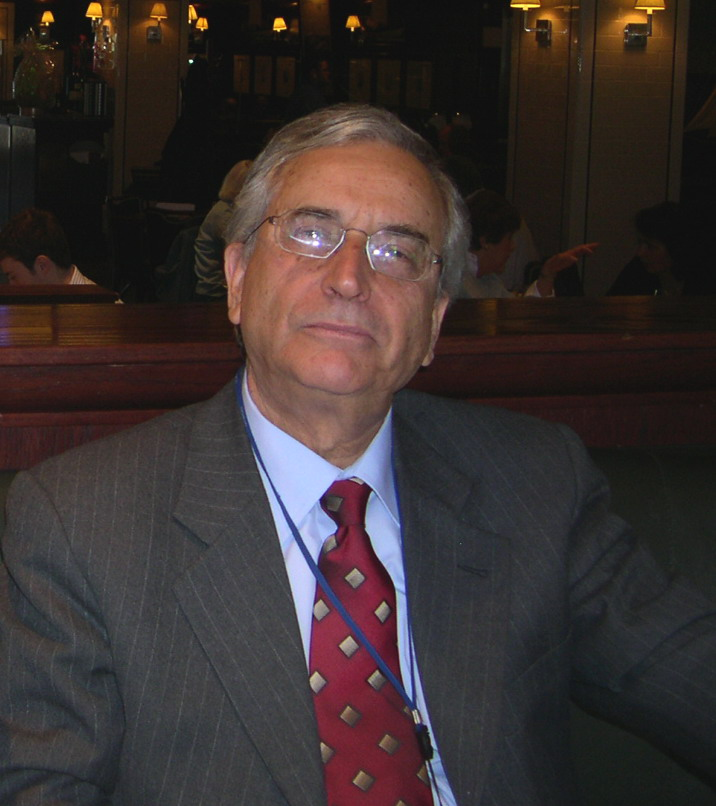
Athanasios Angelopoulos

Athanasios Angelopoulos (Greek: Αθανάσιος Αγγελόπουλος; born 6 November 1939 in Katerini, Northern Greece) is a Professor of Pastoral Theology at the Aristotle University of Thessaloniki; founder and in-honour president of the Institute for National and Religious Studies (Karipion Institute). He studied at the Theology School of the University of Athens as well as in University of Belgrade's Theology School. From 1973 to 1981 he was instructor of theology at Aristotle University; in 1982 he became an assistant professor and in 1984, full professor of Ecclesiastic (Church) History at the Department of Pastoral Theology of the Aristotle University of Thessaloniki.

He is the founder and in-honour president of the Institute for National and Religious Studies - Karipio Melathro, which is based in Thessaloniki, Greece. Angelopoulos is the co-organizer, along with the Greek National Line publishing House of Athens, of the program Ecumenical Hellenism.

He has been honoured with the title of the Archon Actuary of the Holy in Christ Great Mother Church, by the Ecumenical Patriarchate of Constantinople; the award of the Academy of Athens, in 1980; and with awards and prizes from churches, states and institutes.

Angelopoulos had been appointed in the past as Secretary of the Greek Ministry of Education and Religious Affairs; he worked as an advisor of the Orthodox affairs committee of the Greek Parliament and as a special advisor of the Ministry of Macedonia-Thrace.

He has written books about religion, church history, Orthodoxy and has been published in magazines, journals and newspapers. He is a collaborator of the newspaper "To Paron".

Having a personal friendship, for many years, with Iakovos, Archbishop of America, he was appointed as the person responsible for the scientific diligence and publication of the unedited correspondence of the late Archbishop.

In January 2007, Angelopoulos was appointed by the Church of Greece as special advisor and collaborator of the Holy Synod in Athens.

== Memberships ==
- President of the Institute for National and Religious Studies, Thessaloniki, Greece
- Member of the Macedonian studies Society, Thessaloniki
- Member of the American Association for the Advancement of Slavic Studies (Columbus, Ohio)
- Member of the Centre for the Appeals for Freedom (New York), Russian and East European Centre (Illinois)

== External sources ==
- http://karipeion.wordpress.com - Institute for National and Religious Studies (Karipion Institute)
- https://web.archive.org/web/20051016153616/http://www.past.auth.gr/tomeas/aggelop.htm (in Greek)
- https://www.gnl.gr - Ecumenical Hellenism programme (Greek, English)
- Correspondence of late Greek Orthodox leader of Americas to be published - Wikinews article
- Genel Bilgiler
