= René Doynel de Saint-Quentin =

French diplomat and French ambassador to the United States from 1938 to 1940

René Doynel de Saint-Quentin (2 December 1883 Garcelles-Secqueville - 15 March 1961 Paris) was a French diplomat, and French ambassador to the United States from 1938 to 1940.

== Early life ==
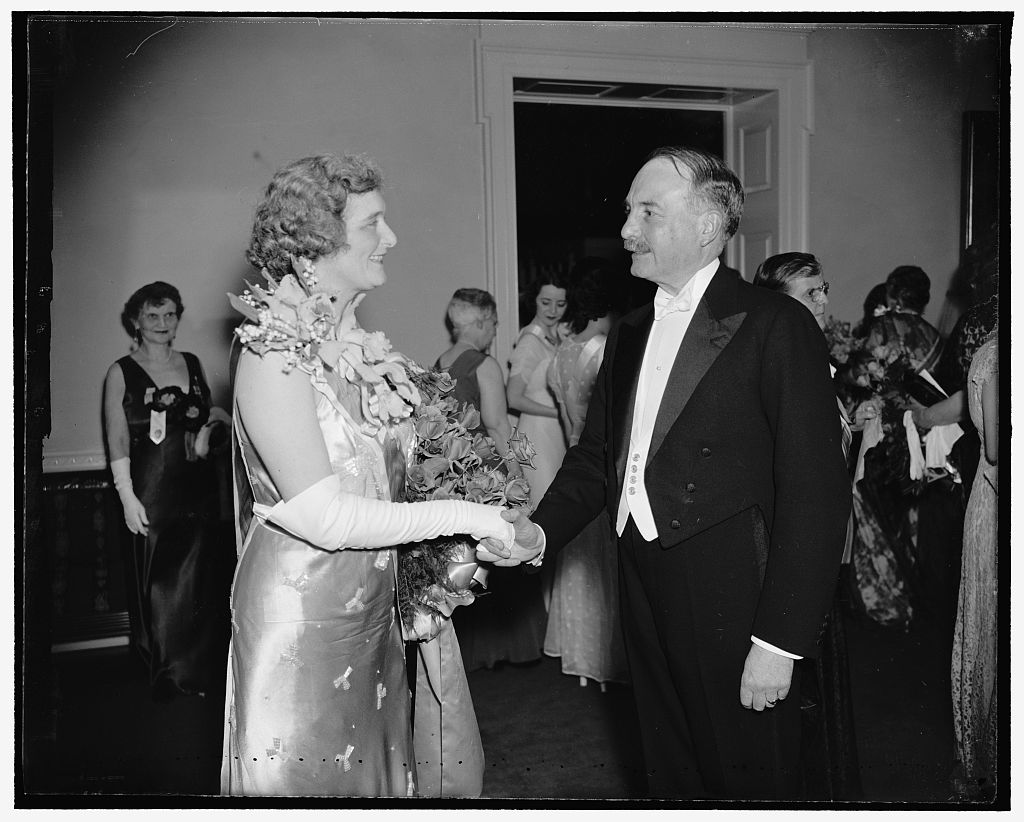
De Saint-Quentin shakes hands with DAR president Florence Hague Becker at a reception in Washington, D.C.

His parents were Jeanne Marie Adélaïde Liégeard, and Louis Eugène Jules Doynel, Count de Saint-Quentin (14 October 1850 - 18 April 1928). His maternal grandfather was the poet Stephen Liégeard. His cousin, Georges Guynemer, was a famed World War I fighter pilot.

De Saint-Quentin graduated from the École libre des sciences politiques, and joined the Foreign Ministry in 1907.

== Career ==
During World War I, he served in the French Army, was wounded twice, and received several decorations. He was French military attaché to the British army in Egypt.

After the war, he was assigned to the General Secretariat of the Berlin Peace Conference, and then to the Protectorate of Morocco. In 1926, he was appointed deputy director of the Africa-Levant section of the Foreign Ministry.

In 1936, he was selected for a major position as French Ambassador to Italy. But the appointment was cancelled due to the Italian invasion of Ethiopia.

In March 1938, Saint-Quentin was appointed ambassador for the first time: the very important post of French Ambassador to the United States. As ambassador, he sought to gain US support for France against Nazi Germany. This was a very delicate task, as there was strong isolationist sentiment in the US, and any overt intervention by France could produce a backlash. When France sought to acquire warplanes from US manufacturers in spite of the Neutrality Acts, he was bypassed.

In March 1940, he made this statement:

If any other country is attacked by Russia ... we will move against the Soviets at once.

Saint-Quentin was completely surprised by France's defeat in 1940, and was immediately replaced by the Vichy France regime. He successfully arranged for the neutralization of French warships in the Caribbean before his successor arrived in September.

He returned to France, and on 27 January 1941 was appointed Ambassador to Brazil by Vichy. After Operation Torch in November 1942, he resigned from his Vichy position, and joined the French Committee of National Liberation formed by General Henri Giraud and Charles de Gaulle in Algiers. He retired on January 12, 1944.

From 1946 to 1961, he was president of the Valentin Haüy Association for the blind. In 1949 he became chairman of the Banque de Salonique.

== Death ==
De Saint-Quentin died on 15 March 1961 in Paris, France.
