= Jewish cemetery of Salonica =

Jewish cemetery in Thessaloniki

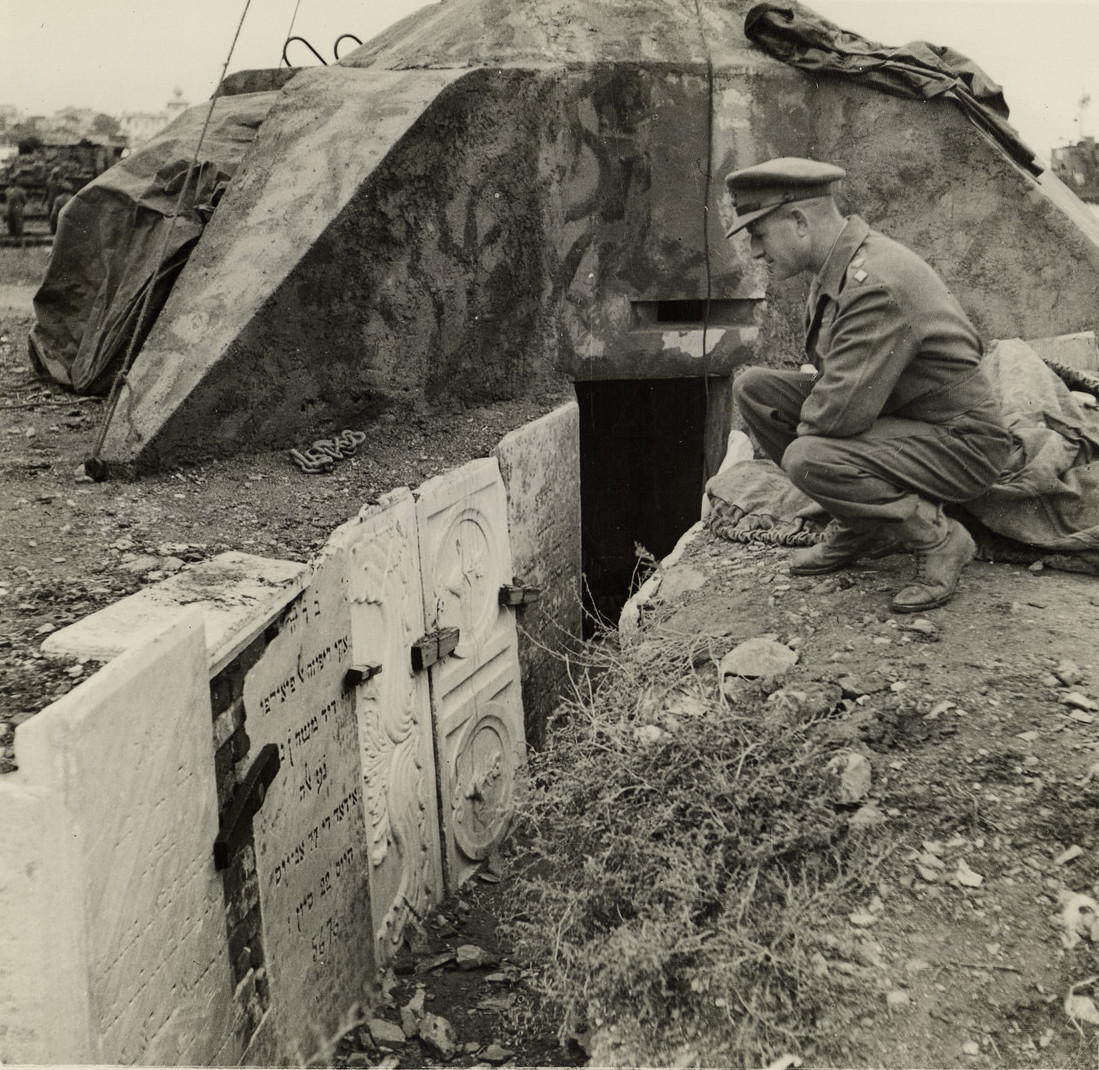
- British officer looking at gravestones from the desecrated Jewish cemetery used to construct German defences, 1944
- Interactive map of Jewish cemetery of Salonica
- 40°37′48″N 22°57′29″E
- Type: Catacombs
- Location: Thessaloniki, Greece

History
- Built: 15th century

The Jewish cemetery of Salonica was established in the late fifteenth century by Sephardic Jews fleeing the expulsion of Jews from Spain, covered around 350,000 square metres (3,800,000 sq ft) and contained almost 500,000 burials. The cemetery's expropriation was envisioned in the urban redevelopment plan following the 1917 Great Fire of Thessaloniki, but strongly opposed by the Jewish community as disturbing the graves violated Jewish law. The cemetery was ultimately destroyed in December 1942 by the municipality of Thessaloniki as part of the Holocaust in Greece during the Axis occupation of Greece. The headstones were used as building materials around the city, including for Greek Orthodox churches, while the Aristotle University of Thessaloniki was built on the grounds. The Jewish community never received compensation for the expropriation of the land, valued at 1.5 billion drachmas in 1943.

== Destruction ==
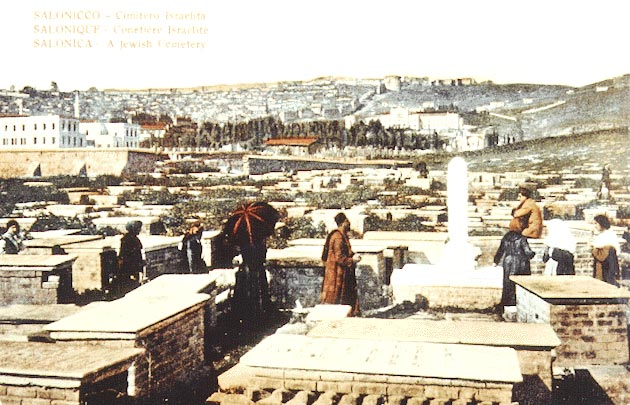
A 19th-century postcard of the cemetery

The Jewish cemetery had been an object of controversy between the city authorities and the Jewish community for decades prior to World War II. According to halacha (Jewish law), it is required that remains are permanently undisturbed. The Jewish community therefore strongly objected to proposals suggesting that the bodies should be exhumed and reburied in two new cemeteries outside the city. In 1926, the Aristotle University of Thessaloniki was established next to the cemetery. In 1937, the Jewish community agreed to cede 30,000 square metres (320,000 sq ft) along the western border next to the university in exchange for having the remainder preserved.

Nazi Germany did not have a consistent policy of destroying or preserving Jewish cemeteries. Historian Mark Mazower states "The Germans gave the green light, but the initiative had not come from them". In mid-1942 thousands of Jewish men from Salonica were conscripted and forced to labor under harsh conditions, causing many deaths. Eventually, the Jewish community agreed to pay a ransom to free them. On 17 October 1942, Vasilis Simonides, the governor-general of Macedonia told the Jewish community to move the graves to two new cemeteries on the outskirts of the city. The final agreement to destroy the cemetery was made at the end of November 1942, after the Allied landings in North Africa. According to this agreement, much of the cemetery would be annexed to the university and other parts would be taken over by the municipality, but graves more recent than 30 years would remain untouched. However, the municipality and the General Government of Macedonia reneged on this agreement and destroyed the entire cemetery.

The cemetery was partly destroyed in the first week of December 1942 in a process overseen by the chief engineer of Thessaloniki municipality, Athanassios Broikos, and involving five hundred workers. Jewish community leader Michael Molho believed that the Christians were eager to destroy the cemetery quickly because they wanted to complete it before Allied liberation of the area.

One survivor recalled:

People were running between the tombs begging the destroyers to spare those of their relatives; with tears, they collected the remains. In my family vault, there were the remains of my brother, aged twenty, who died during a journey to Rome. His body was brought back from abroad and put in two coffins, one in metal and the other in wood. When the second coffin was opened my poor brother appeared in his smocking and his pointed shoes as though he had been put there yesterday. My mother fainted.

According to historians Carla Hesse and Thomas Laqueur, "Nowhere else, in no other great city, did the imperatives of modernity and nation-building telescope so decisively with the crisis of occupation and genocide."

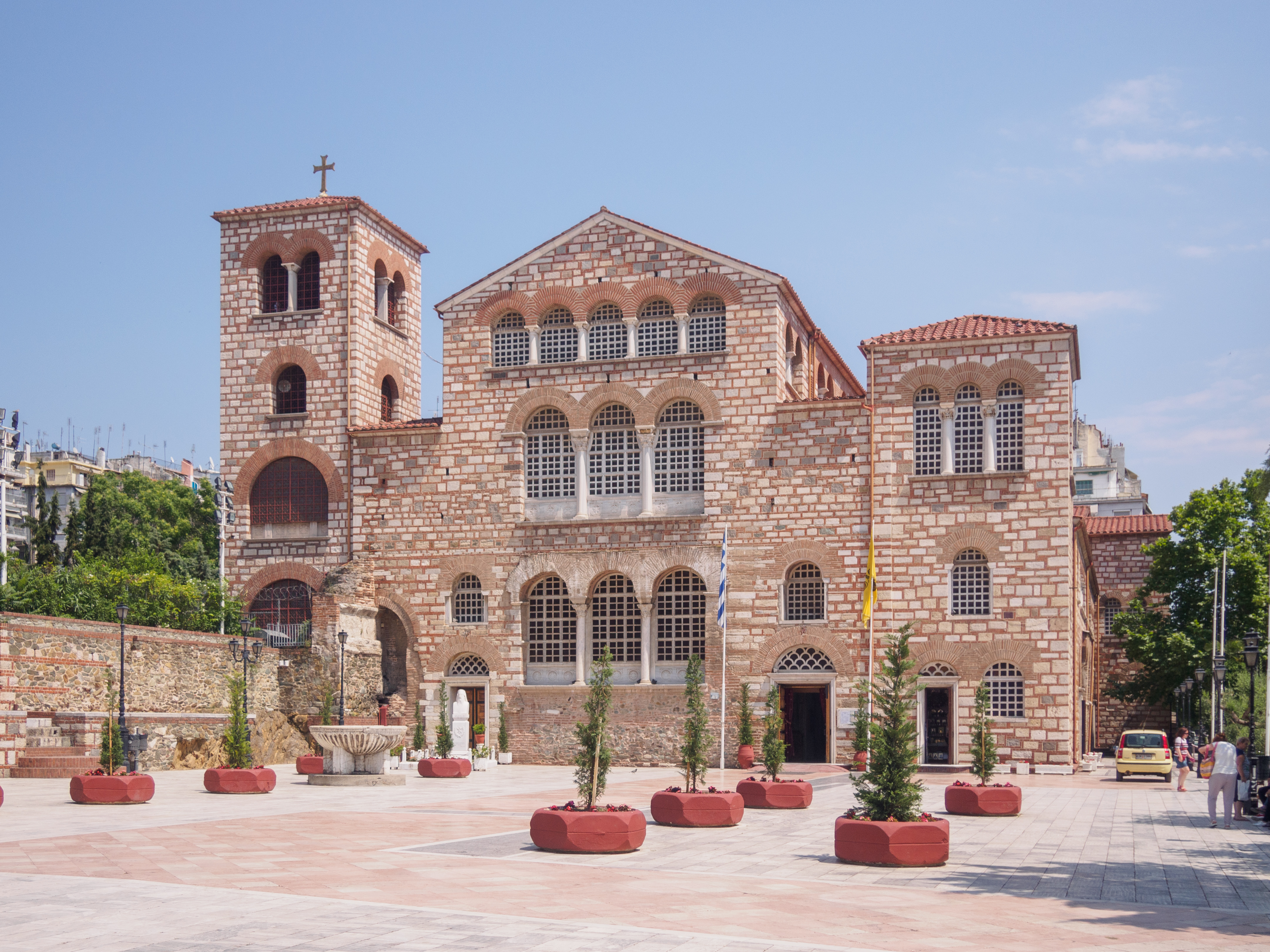
Tombstones from the cemetery were used for the reconstruction of the Hagios Demetrios basilica.

The destruction of the cemetery was completed during the tenure of George Seremetis as mayor of Thessaloniki. Seremetis then sold the tombstones to contractors for use as materials in various projects. Some of the stones were confiscated by German occupation authorities to build roads, public baths, and a swimming pool.

== Aftermath ==
Some parts of the cemetery survived intact as late as 1947. Many tombstones were appropriated and used by the city authorities and the Greek Orthodox Church. After the war, people (including city officials) were still carrying away Jewish gravestones each day and regularly looting the cemetery in search of valuables. A 1992 commemorative book pictures Greek schoolgirls playing Hamlet with skulls and other bones they found in the cemetery. As of 2017, there are still tombstones in various walls, roads, and churches around the city, although when found they are returned to the new Jewish cemetery. According to historian Rena Molho, "one can still find, as the writer has personally witnessed, Jewish tombs decorating children's playgrounds, bars, and restaurants in modern hotels in the summer resorts of the Chalkidiki". The Jewish Museum of Thessaloniki contains some monumental stones and inscriptions with photographs showing the cemetery and visitors as it was in 1914.

The Jewish community never received compensation for the confiscation of the land under the cemetery, valued in 1943 at 1.5 billion drachmas.

A memorial to the Jewish cemetery was unveiled in 2014 on the grounds of Aristotle University. The memorial has been vandalized several times.

== See also ==
- History of the Jews in Thessaloniki

== Sources ==
- Apostolou, Andrew (2018). "Greek Collaboration in the Holocaust and the Course of the War". The Holocaust in Greece. Cambridge University Press. pp. 89–112. ISBN 978-1-108-47467-2.
- Bowman, Steven B. (2009). The Agony of Greek Jews, 1940–1945. Stanford University Press. ISBN 978-0-8047-7249-5.
- Fleming, Katherine Elizabeth (2008). Greece: A Jewish History. Princeton University Press. ISBN 978-0-691-10272-6.
- Glenny, Misha (1999). The Balkans: Nationalism, War and the Great Powers, 1804–1999. ISBN 978-1-77089-273-6.
- Hesse, Carla; Laqueur, Thomas W. (2018). "Bodies Visible and Invisible". The Holocaust in Greece. Cambridge University Press. pp. 327–358. ISBN 978-1-108-47467-2.
- Kornetis, Kostis (2018). "Expropriating the Space of the Other: Property Spoliations of Thessalonican Jews in the 1940s". The Holocaust in Greece. Cambridge University Press. pp. 228–252. ISBN 978-1-108-47467-2.
- Mazower, Mark (2004). Salonica, City of Ghosts: Christians, Muslims and Jews 1430–1950. Knopf Doubleday Publishing Group. ISBN 978-0-307-42757-1.
- Molho, Rena (2010). Salonica and Istanbul: Social, Political and Cultural Aspects of Jewish Life. Gorgias Press. ISBN 978-975-428-278-8.
- Saltiel, Leon (2014). "Dehumanizing the Dead: The Destruction of Thessaloniki's Jewish Cemetery in the Light of New Sources". Yad Vashem Studies. 42 (1): 1–35.
- Vassilikou, Maria (2000). "The Jewish Cemetery of Salonika in the Crossroads of Urban Modernisation and Anti-Semitism". European Judaism: A Journal for the New Europe. 33 (1): 118–131. doi:10.3167/ej.2000.330115. ISSN 0014-3006. JSTOR 41431061.
