= Bank of Salonica =

Former bank

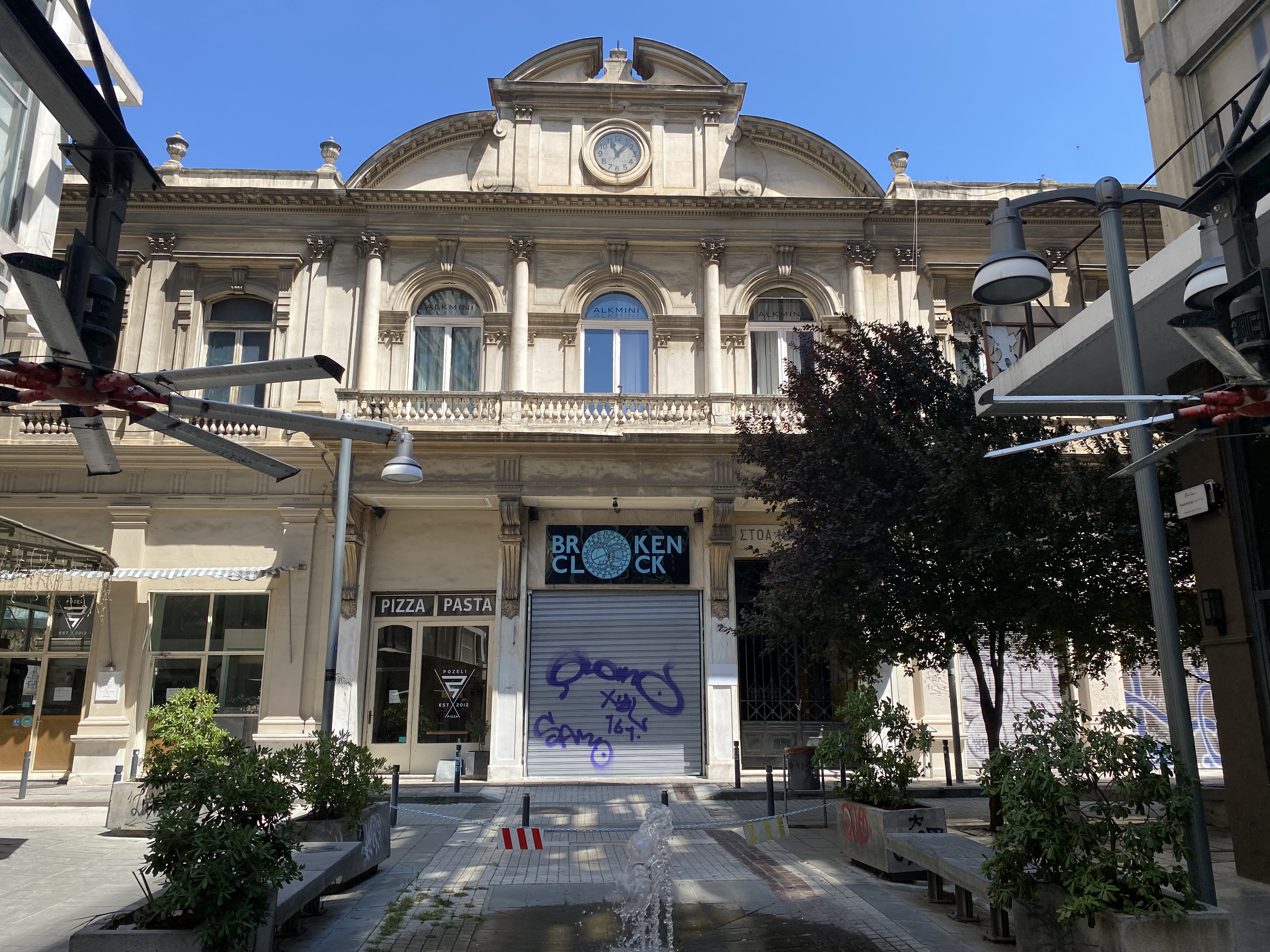
The bank's former headquarters in Thessaloniki, now Stoa Malakopi

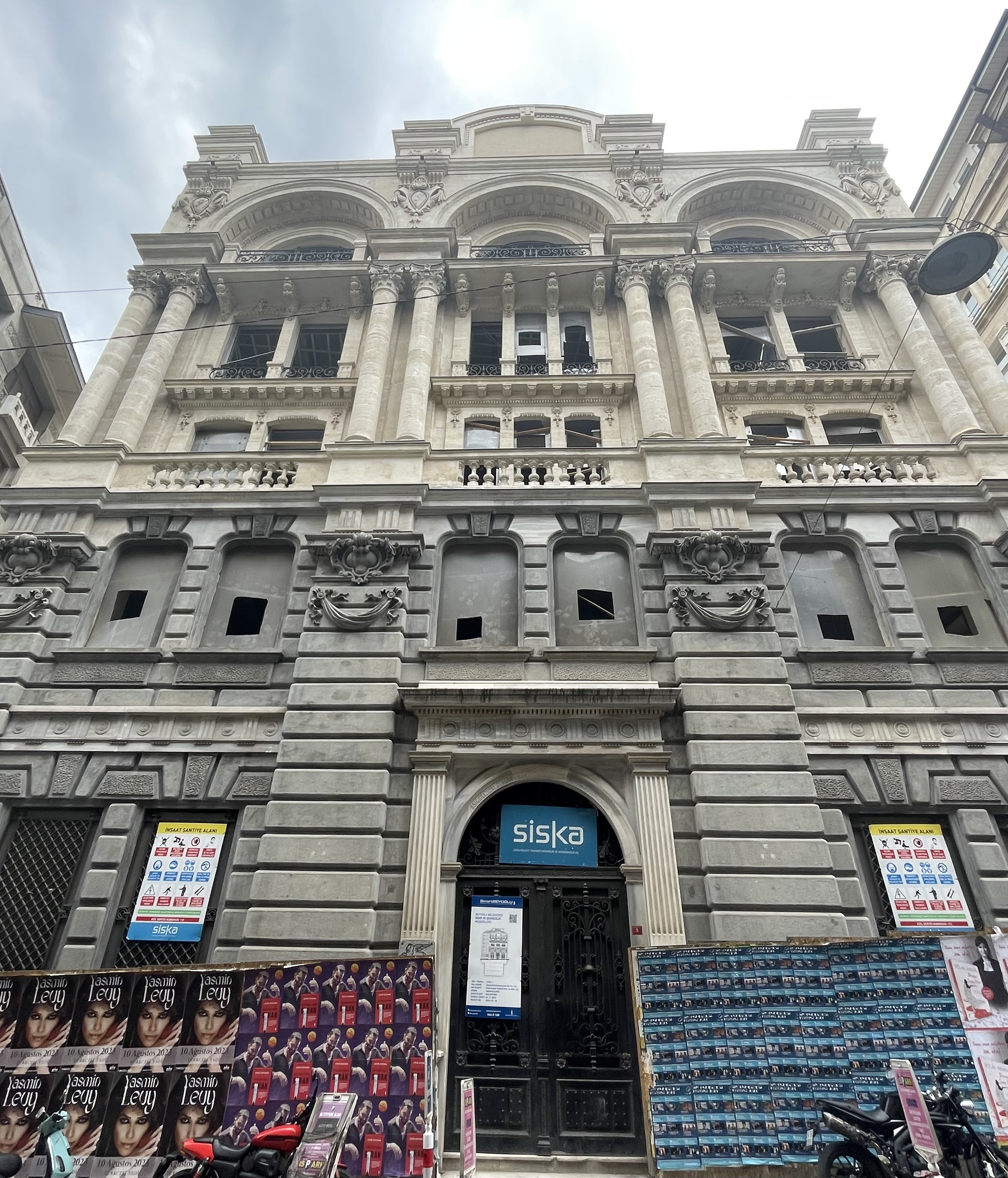
Former head office in Constantinople/Istanbul, on Bankalar Caddesi

The Bank of Salonica (French: Banque de Salonique, Greek: Τράπεζα Θεσσαλονίκης, Turkish: Selanik Bankası) was a regional bank headquartered in Thessaloniki (then known as Salonica) and Istanbul. Created in 1886 under the initial leadership of the Salonica Jewish Allatini family with Austrian, Hungarian and French banking partners, it contributed to the development of the Eastern Mediterranean and Southern Balkans during the late Ottoman Empire. In the Interwar period its activity was mainly focused on Northern Greece, where it operated until the German occupation, and Turkey, where it kept operating until 2001, albeit under different names after 1969. Its preserved headquarters buildings are landmarks, respectively, of Valaoritou Street, a significant thoroughfare of downtown Thessaloniki, and of Bankalar Caddesi in the Karaköy neighborhood of Istanbul.

== Name ==
The defunct bank's French name is commonly used because of its historical context. In the late 19th century, the use of French was prominent among the many languages of the Ottoman Empire, especially in the business community and even more so in Thessaloniki. The bank's internal language for its corporate operations was French from its founding in 1888. Furthermore, the bank was controlled by French interests from 1907 until 1969. In Turkey, the bank increasingly operated under its Turkish name Selanik Bankası especially after its legal restructuring in 1934 to comply with the new Turkish banking law. Even then, however, its securities were labeled bilingually in Turkish and French.

== History ==
The bank was established in Thessaloniki (then known as Salonica) in 1886, as a joint investment of the banking office of the Allatini family group (Fratelli Allatini), the Comptoir d'escompte de Paris, the Austrian Länderbank of Vienna, and the latter's Budapest affiliate, the Bank of Hungarian Lands (German: Ungarische Landesbank). Among the founding investors, the Bank of Hungarian Lands disappeared in 1887; in turn, the Comptoir d'escompte collapsed in 1889, and its stake in the Banque de Salonique was acquired by the Imperial Ottoman Bank.

The Banque de Salonique soon opened branches in Istanbul, Monastir (now Bitola) in 1893, Smyrna (now İzmir) in 1898, Kavala in 1904, Üsküb (now Skopje) in 1907, as well as offices in Dedeağaç (now Alexandroupoli), İskeçe (Xanthi) and Drama in 1909 and Sofulu (Soufli), Kumanova (Kumanovo) and Gümülcine (now Komotini) in 1910. It also opened Egyptian branches in Alexandria and Cairo in 1905, but that business had to be liquidated following the severe impact in Egypt of the panic of 1907 and the two branches were eventually acquired in 1909 by Banco di Roma. Undeterred, it kept expanding in the region with a branch in Beirut in 1909 and another in Tripoli in 1911. By 1911 it also had locations in Edirne, Yenice (presumably today's Giannitsa), and Samsun, and by 1913 in Kirk-Kilisse (now Kırklareli).

The Banque de Salonique was listed on the Paris Bourse in 1904, and incurred four capital increases between 1905 and 1908. France's Société Générale participated in one of these transactions in 1907 and consequently acquired a controlling ownership stake for itself and its French clients in the Banque de Salonique, whose new shareholders also included the Banque de Paris et des Pays-Bas and the Anglo-Austrian Bank of Vienna. Given its expansion in multiple parts of the Ottoman Empire, the Banque de Salonique moved its headquarters from Thessaloniki to Istanbul in July 1910. Société Générale quickly became its main financial supporter, not least during the turmoil of the Balkan Wars in 1912–1913, and also granted credit directly to the Allatini family businesses. In the early 1910s, Société Générale also had to manage an unstable competitive balance between the Banque de Salonique and its larger competitor (and also minority shareholder) the Imperial Ottoman Bank. In the context of rising tension between France and Austria-Hungary, the Austrian Länderbank in 1913 sold its interest in Banque de Salonique to the Russo-Asiatic Bank, which also had strong links with the Société Générale.

In 1918, in view of the new geopolitical situation cemented by World War I and the Russian Revolution, the bank closed its operations in Monastir, Üsküb, Xanthi, Dedeagach, Gyumyurdjina, Tripoli, Kirk-Kilisse, and Drama. More fundamentally, Société Générale could no longer use it as a vehicle for business in Istanbul and the disintegrating Ottoman Empire, let alone as a springboard for business in Russia as it had hoped for in the early 1910s. Société Générale consequently sold its controlling interest in October 1919 to the Crédit Foncier d'Algérie et de Tunisie (CFAT), also headquartered in Paris. Simultaneously, the bank's governance and management were renewed, with new Turkish board members and French executives, even though members of the Allatini/Misrachi family remained involved with the bank throughout the 1920s. By 1925, the CFAT owned more than half of the Banque de Salonique's equity capital.

Following the Treaty of Lausanne and the normalization of Greek-Turkish relations in 1923, the Banque de Salonique was able to resume its business development in Turkey, even though it closed its Edirne office in 1924. In the interwar period it opened new branches in Adana and Mersin, in addition to its Istanbul seat of Galata (transformed into a newly capitalized bank in 1934) and branches near Sultan Hammam across the Golden Horn and in Smyrna (eventually closed in the 1930s). It also expanded in Greece from its Northern base, and in 1925 opened an office in Athens, then another one in Piraeus in 1931, in addition to the prewar branch it had kept in Kavala.

During World War II, most of the bank's staff in Thessaloniki fell victims of the destruction of the Jewish community by the German occupation forces, which also commandeered the bank's building and burnt its archive. Following the liberation of Greece in 1944, the CFAT opted not to revive its Greek activity and sold the Thessaloniki seat and branches to the Bank of Chios in 1947.

In Turkey, the bank's operations were comparatively unaffected during the second world war, thanks to the country's neutrality. The Banque de Salonique opened a new Istanbul branch in Osmanbey in 1958. (The Sultan Hammam branch, meanwhile, was relocated to Eminönü in 1955.) In the 1960s, however, the CFAT lost its core Algerian and Tunisian operations (it renamed itself Société Centrale de Banque in 1963) and its Levantine footprint became increasingly difficult to maintain. It closed the Mersin branch in 1967, and in 1969 sold its controlling stake in Banque de Salonique to Yapı Kredi, which renamed it International Bank for Industry and Commerce (Turkish: Uluslararası Endüstri ve Ticaret Bankası). Yapı Kredi was then purchased by Çukurova Holding in 1975, and with it, the majority of the shares in Uluslararası. It changed name again to become İnterbank in 1990. In 1996 Çukurova sold its majority stake to Cavit Çağlar's Nergis Holdings. Eventually İnterbank was taken over by the Savings Deposit Insurance Fund of Turkey in January 1999, and liquidated during the 2001 Turkish economic crisis.

== Buildings ==
=== Thessaloniki ===
The headquarters building of the Banque de Salonique in downtown Thessaloniki was designed in 1905 by Vitaliano Poselli, and completed in 1909, on ground that was previously the large garden of the Allatini family mansion. It was damaged in the Great Thessaloniki Fire of 1917 and again in the 1932 Ierissos earthquake, but was subsequently repaired. After World War II and the Banque de Salonique's demise, it hosted the Bank of Chios from 1950 to 1954, when the Voreopoulou family purchased it and renamed it "Malakopi Arcade" (Greek: Στοά Μαλακοπή) in memory of their ancestral town, now Derinkuyu in central Turkey. Its clock was stopped by the 1978 Thessaloniki earthquake and, in memory of that event, stands still at 11:05. The building was listed as a protected landmark in 1983. As of 2021, one of the arcade's shops is named Pizzeria Poselli in a tribute to the building's architect.

=== Istanbul ===
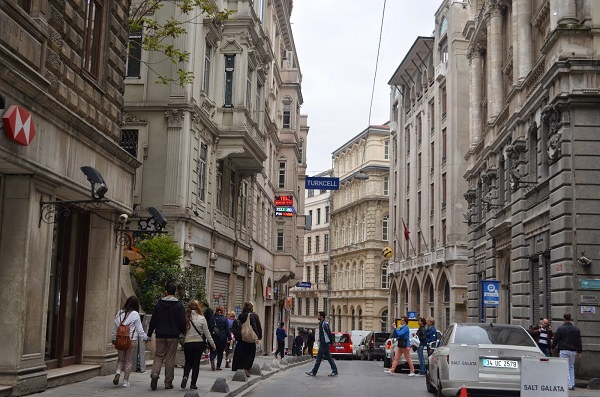
Bankalar Caddesi in Istanbul with the bank's former headquarters at far right

From 1913 onwards, the Banque de Salonique's seat in Istanbul was located in the Generali Han building built in 1909 by Assicurazioni Generali on a design by architect Giulio Mongeri. That building lies immediately to the east of the Imperial Ottoman Bank's headquarters in downhill Galata, now the Karaköy neighborhood. The bank only rented part of the building from Generali, including the street level on Bankalar Caddesi. It was kept by the bank until the 1990s, when it became Generali's Turkish headquarters. Generali in turn sold it in 2011 to businessman İsmet Koçak for redevelopment as a hotel.

=== Izmir ===
The bank's branch building, on the city's central Fevzipaşa Boulevard, was left undamaged by the burning of Smyrna in 1922 but was nevertheless rebuilt in ornate Art Deco style later in the 1920s. That building is no longer extant.

== Leadership ==
The bank's key officers included the chairman of the board of directors (French: président), the chief executive (French: administrateur délégué) and general manager (French: directeur). The latter two were occasionally held by the same individual.

=== Chairmen ===
- Othon de Bourgoing (April 1888-September 1908)
- André Bénac (1908–1937)
- Xavier Loisy (1937–1949)
- René Doynel de Saint-Quentin (1949–1961)

=== Chief Executives ===
- Emmanuel Salem (1918–1928)
- Michel Le Grain (1928-January 1931)
- Emmanuel Salem (January 1931-March 1937)

=== General managers ===
- Hans Schuschny (April 1888-June 1896)
- Alfred Misrachi (June 1896 – 1922)
- Hector Sonolet (1923–1925)
- Michel Le Grain (1925-January 1931)
- François Gérard-Varet (1931–1948)

== See also ==
- Allatini (company)
- Marcel Dassault, whose mother was born in the Allatini family
- Deutsche Orientbank
- Privileged Bank of Epirothessaly
- List of banks in Greece
