= Jewish Museum of Thessaloniki =

Museum in Greece

Coordinates: 40°38′6.97″N 22°56′23.27″E

- Εβραϊκό Μουσείο Θεσσαλονίκης
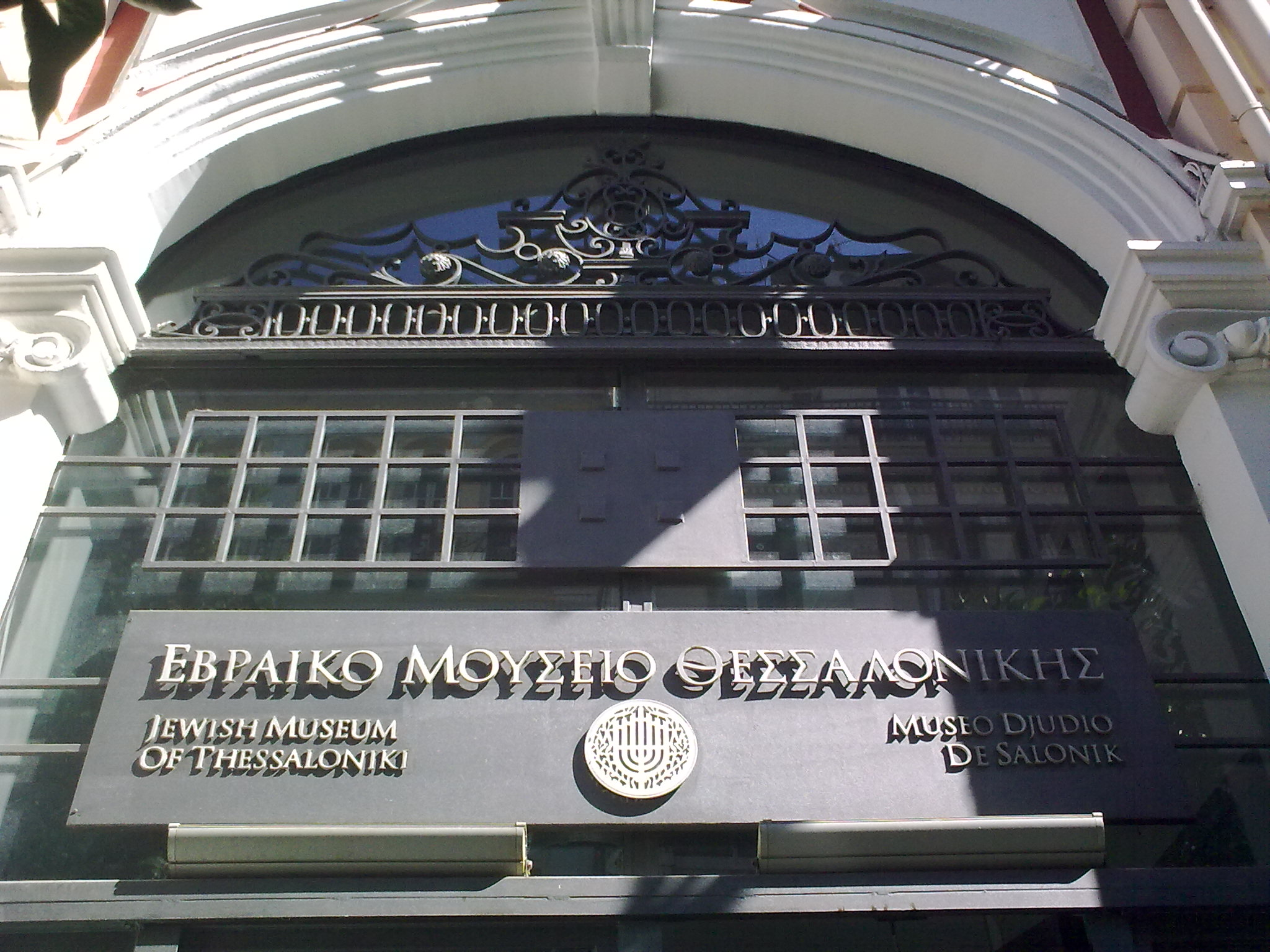
- Jewish Museum of Thessaloniki sign features at the building's facade
- Location: Thessaloniki, Central Macedonia, Greece
- Owner: Jewish Community of Thessaloniki.
- Website: http://www.jmth.gr

The Jewish Museum of Thessaloniki (Greek: Εβραϊκό Μουσείο Θεσσαλονίκης, Ladino: Museo Djudio de Salonik) is a museum in Thessaloniki, Central Macedonia, Greece. It displays the history of Sephardic Jews and Jewish life in Thessaloniki. The museum is being run by the Jewish community of the city.

It is also known as the "Museum of Jewish Presence in Thessaloniki", "Jewish History Museum", Greek: "Κέντρο Ιστορικής Διαδρομής Εβραϊσμού Θεσσαλονίκης", "Μουσείο Εβραϊκής Παρουσίας στη Θεσσαλονίκη".

== History ==
The museum is located on 13 Agiou Mina Street. The museum was opened on May 13, 2001, by Evangelos Venizelos, then the Minister of Culture and Andreas Sefiha, the president of the Jewish Community of Thessaloniki. It was Sefiha who had the idea of establishing the museum and started working towards it in 1994. The collection of the museum was based on the documents, ritual objects, and photographic collections as well as the library that used to be housed at Vasileos Herakleiou 26, and was known as "The Center of the Course of Jewish history, in Thessaloniki" or "Center for the Jewish Studies of Thessaloniki" or "Jewish History Centre of Thessaloniki".

In 2019, the museum opened a new wing which added four additional spaces. This included the addition of a museum shop and information on Jewish architecture and Jewish history during the interwar years. The then-president of Greece, Prokopios Pavlopoulos, attended the inauguration of the new wing.

== Building ==
The building was constructed in 1904 by the Italian architect, Vitaliano Poselli. It housed the Bank of Athens from 1906 to 1925, then later the L'Independent, a Jewish newspaper that ran from 1909 to 1941. The restoration of the building lasted from 1998 to 2003 and was funded by the "Organisation for the Cultural Capital of Europe Thessaloniki 1997". In 2019 the museum was expanded with a new wing that included a shop, new accessible entrance, and exhibition spaces designed by architects Elias Messinas and KARD Architects - Dimitris Raidis and Alexandros Kouloukouris. With the new expansion of the museum, two buildings—the townhouse and the new wing—were attached by arches on their facade to connect as a single portico.

== Collections ==
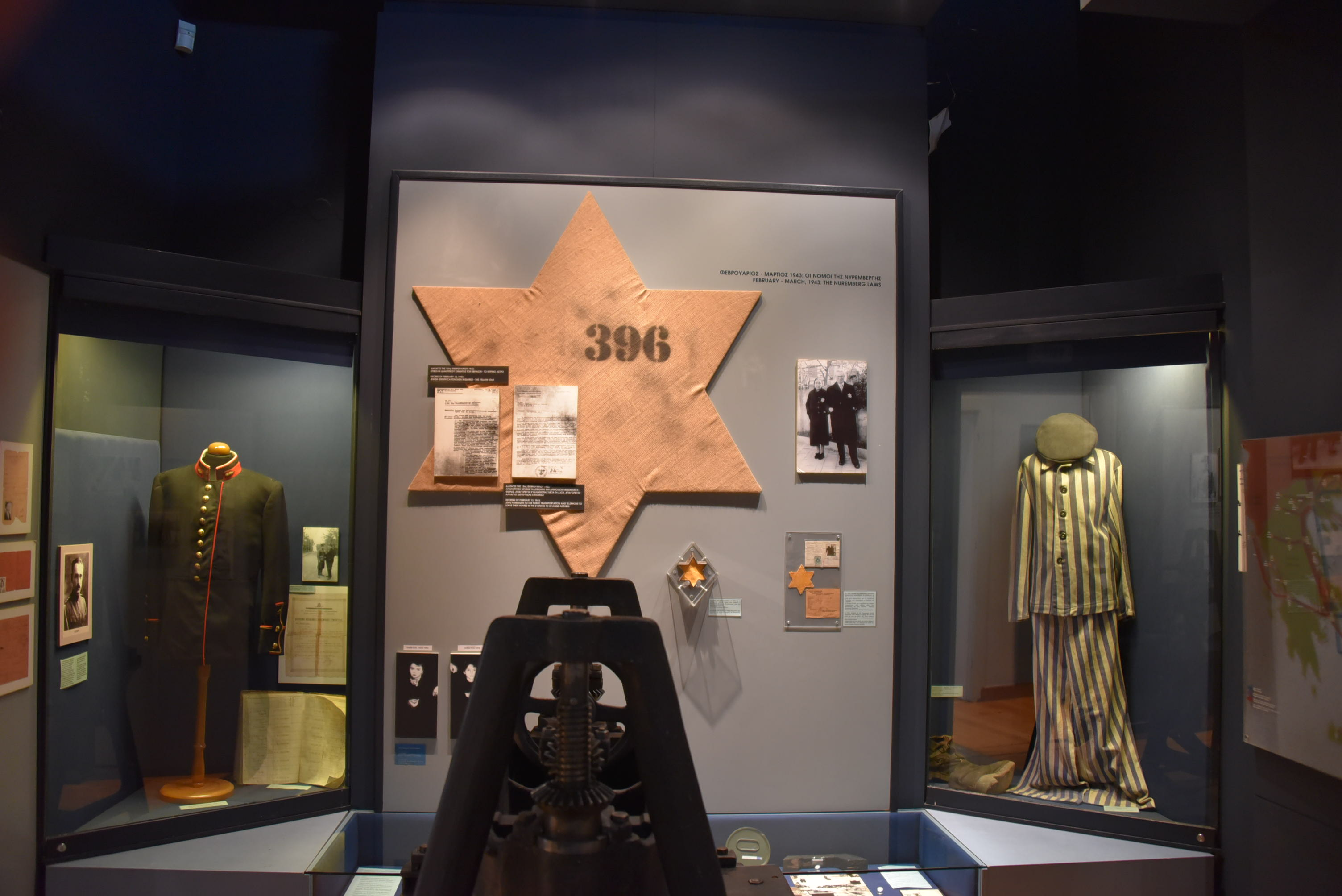
Holocaust exhibition

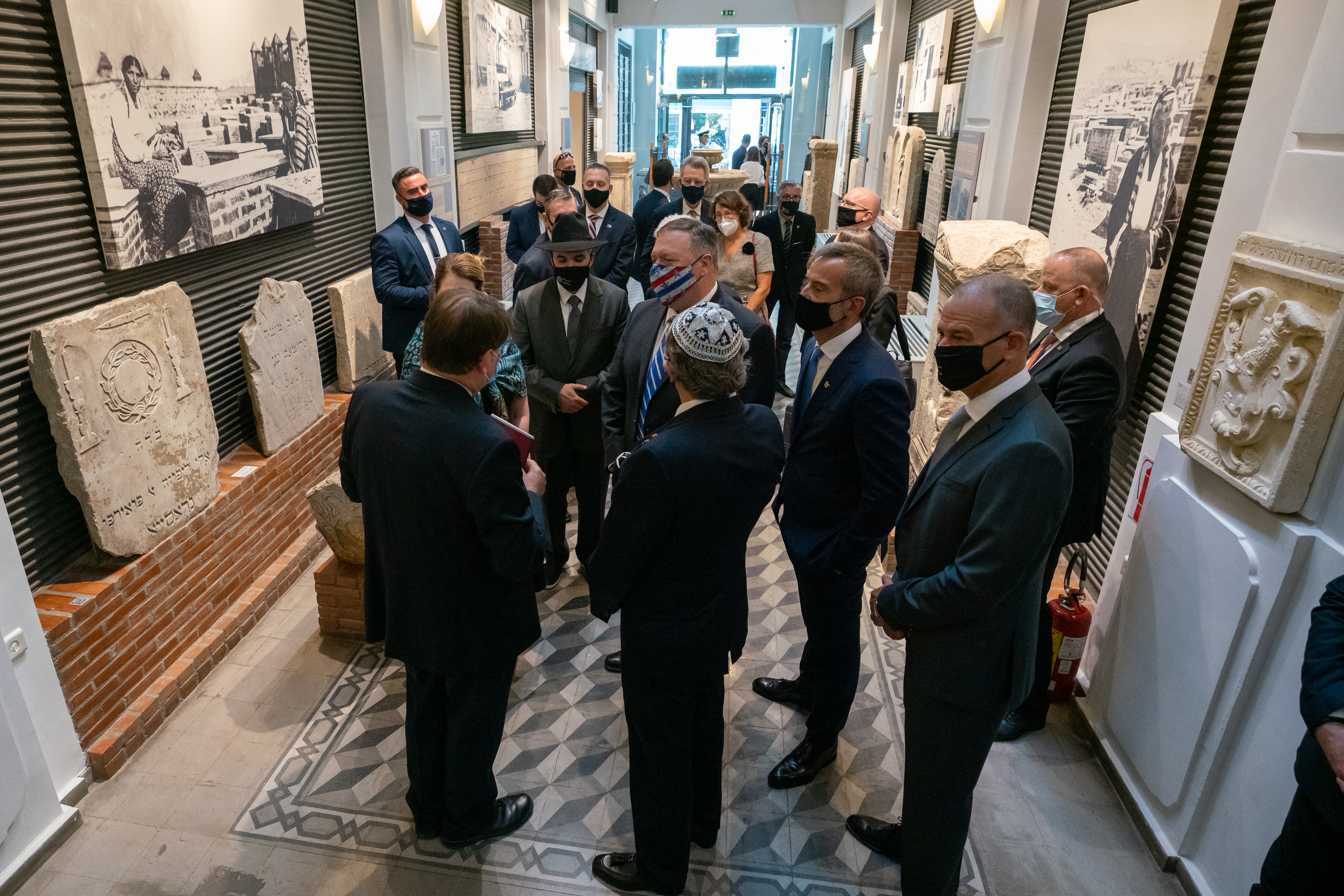
Secretary of State Michael Pompeo attends a Yom Kippur Commemoration at the Jewish Museum of Thessaloniki (2020)

The museum maintains a number of collections: Tombstones from the destroyed Jewish Cemetery, building members from synagogues demolished by the German occupation authorities, religious objects, old and rare books in Hebrew, family heirlooms, ketoubot, public and private letters during the WWII, costumes (19th and 20th centuries), fabrics, tablecloths, books and bank deposit booklets (until 1940).

Furthermore, the museum maintains a collection of pre-war family and school photographs. These artefacts were donated by expatriate Jews from Thessaloniki.

On the ground level are monumental stones and inscriptions that were once found in the great Jewish necropolis that lay to the east of the city walls. Accompanying these stones are a series of photographs showing the cemetery and visitors as it was in 1914.

Central to the first floor is a narrative history of the Jewish presence in Thessaloniki from the third century BCE until the Second World War. A separate exhibit focuses on the Shoah, as it affected the Jewish Community of Thessaloniki. The majority of the community - some 49,000 people - were systematically deported to Auschwitz and Bergen-Belsen where most of them perished.

Since 2005, the museum has collected a large number of documents through a special four-year research program. Thanks to the assistance of experienced collectors, such as Giannis Megas, the Jewish Museum of Thessaloniki today has the most important collection of Thessaloniki business documents, in which, until 1940, Jewish-owned businesses had a dominant position.

A research and documentation center operates within the premises, which aims to document and digitize archival documents from the museum's own collection as well as archival material from other sources, thus creating a database accessible to visitors and researchers. All aforementioned artefacts can currently be accessed via electronic databases.

The museum provides special educational programs for schools.

This gallery shows part of the collection as this was displayed before the museum's establishment in year 2001.

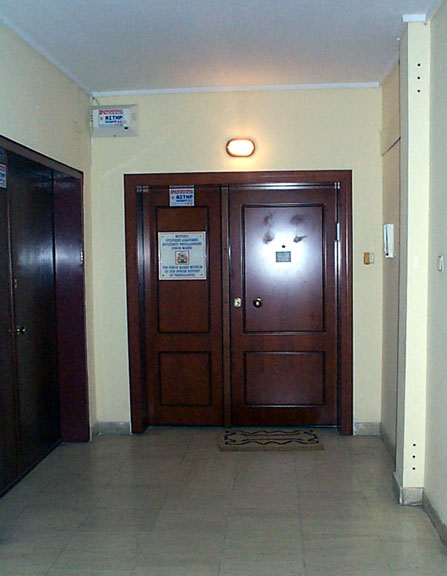
View from outside [before 2001]

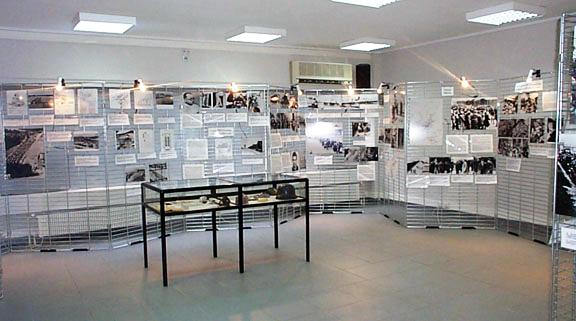
Exhibition of photographs relating to the Holocaust [before 2001]

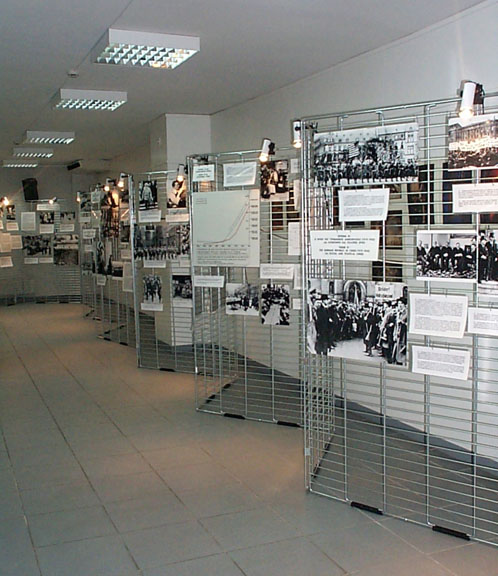
The same [before 2001]

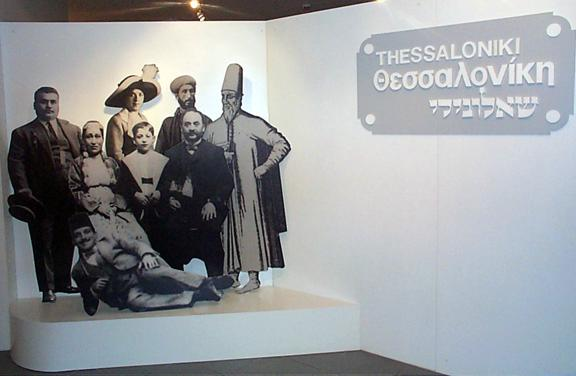
The permanent exhibition titled Thessaloniki: The Metropolis of Sephardic Jewry [before 2001]

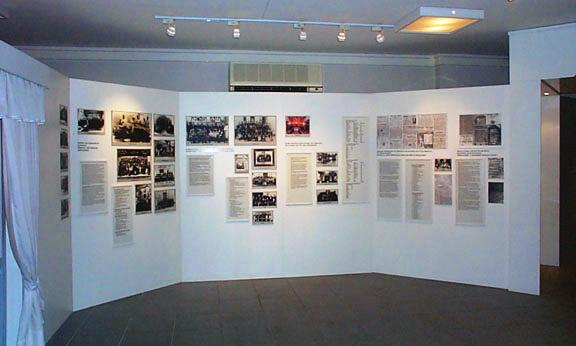
The same [before 2001]

== Facts and figures ==
More than 4000 people visited the museum from September 2009 until June 2010, mainly Jews from around the world, but also researchers who wanted to access the museums archives and library.

The museum is a member of the Association of European Jewish Museums (AEJM).

== See also ==
- Holocaust Museum of Greece
- History of the Jews of Thessaloniki
- History of the Jews in Greece
- Jewish Museum of Greece
- Jewish Museum of Rhodes
