= Vitaliano Poselli =

Italian architect (1840–1918)

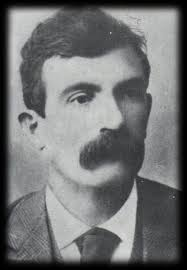
Vitaliano Poselli

Vitaliano Poselli (1840–1918) was an Italian architect from Sicily, mostly known for his work in the city of Thessaloniki, in northern Greece.

== Life ==
He was born in Castiglione di Sicilia in 1838, and studied in Rome. In 1867, the Catholic Church commissioned to him the construction of the Church of Santo Stefano in Istanbul.

From there, the Ottoman government sent him to Thessaloniki (then known as Selânik), where he built some of the most important public edifices of the city. In 1888 he was married and established his residence there. The foreign missions and representatives, such as wealthy merchants of the city, assigned him also the creation of various communal, merchant or private buildings.

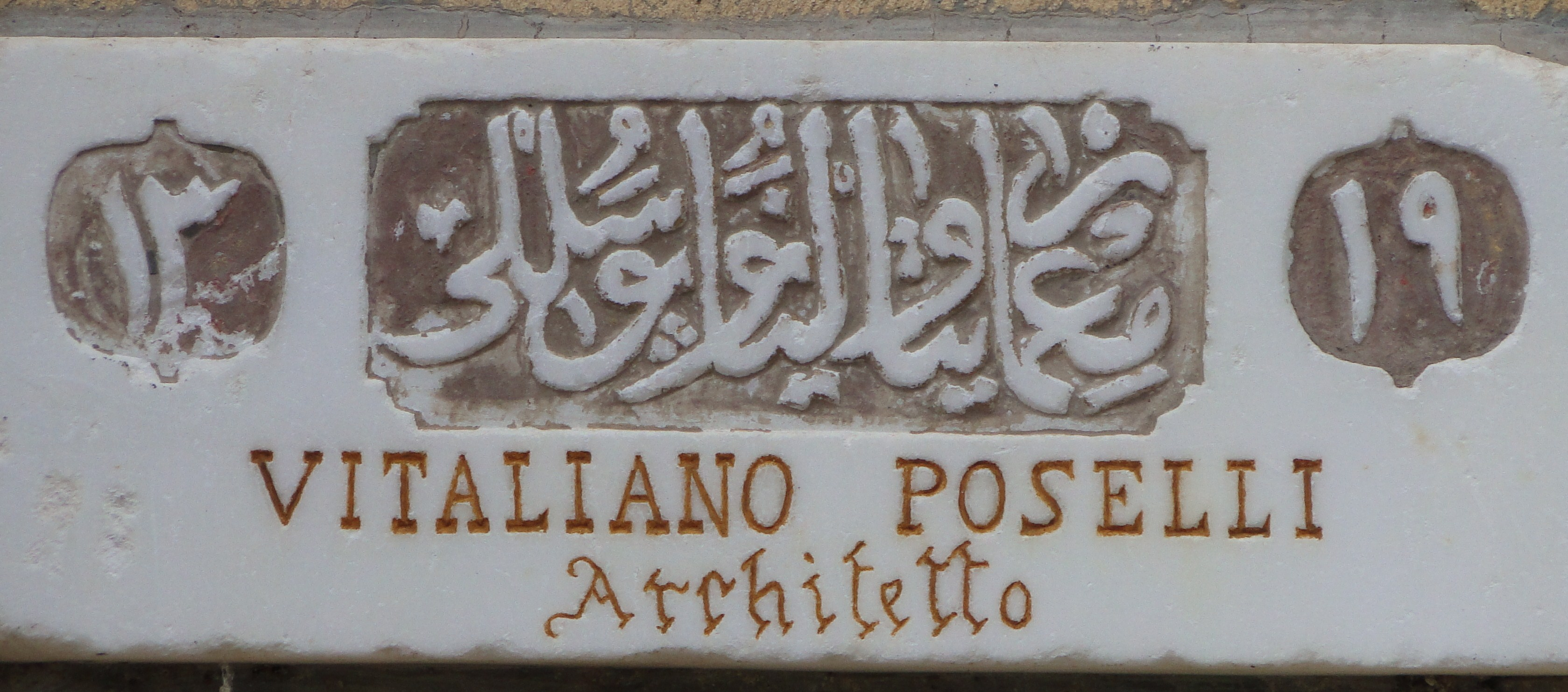
Vitaliano Poselli seal on the New Mosque, Thessaloniki

Some of his most known works are the Idadiè Imperial College, today's Philosophy Faculty of the Aristotle University (1888), the Government House (Konak) (1891), the Imperial Army Headquarters, today the Greek III Army Corps Headquarters, the New Mosque (1902), the Allatini Mills, the Karipeion Melathron, the State Conservatory building (former Ottoman Bank), the Stoa Malakopi (formerly Banque de Salonique), the Bank of Athens building (today the Jewish Museum of Thessaloniki), Villa Allatini (for the Allatini family, today housing the prefecture), Villa Morpurgo/Zardinidi, the Catholic church of the Immaculate Conception (1897), the Armenian church (1903) and the Catholic churches, and the synagogue of Bet Saul (1898, destroyed 1943).

He had six sons (Primo, Secondo, Terzo, Quarto, Quinto, and Sesto or Emilio) and two daughters. Secondo was a musician. Terzo was a volunteer who served in France against Germany and died in a motorcycle accident on a bridge; his name is written on a grave, in the French cemetery in Thessaloniki, that reminds the Greeks from Thessaloniki who died for the France in the First World War. Singer Luisa Poselli was his relative. He had also a younger brother, Salvatore, who designed also some buildings in Thessaloniki.

He died in 1918 and is buried in the Catholic cemetery of St Vincent in Thessaloniki. Many of his descendants still live in the city.

== Gallery ==
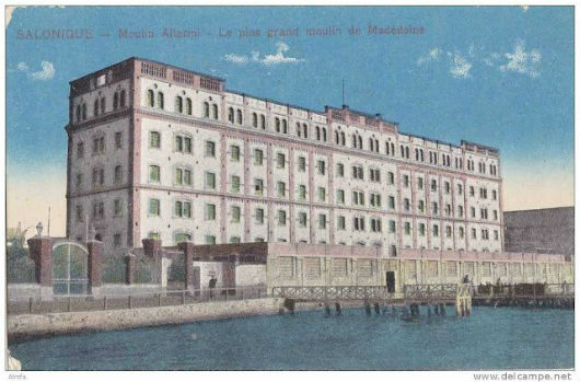
Allatini Mills

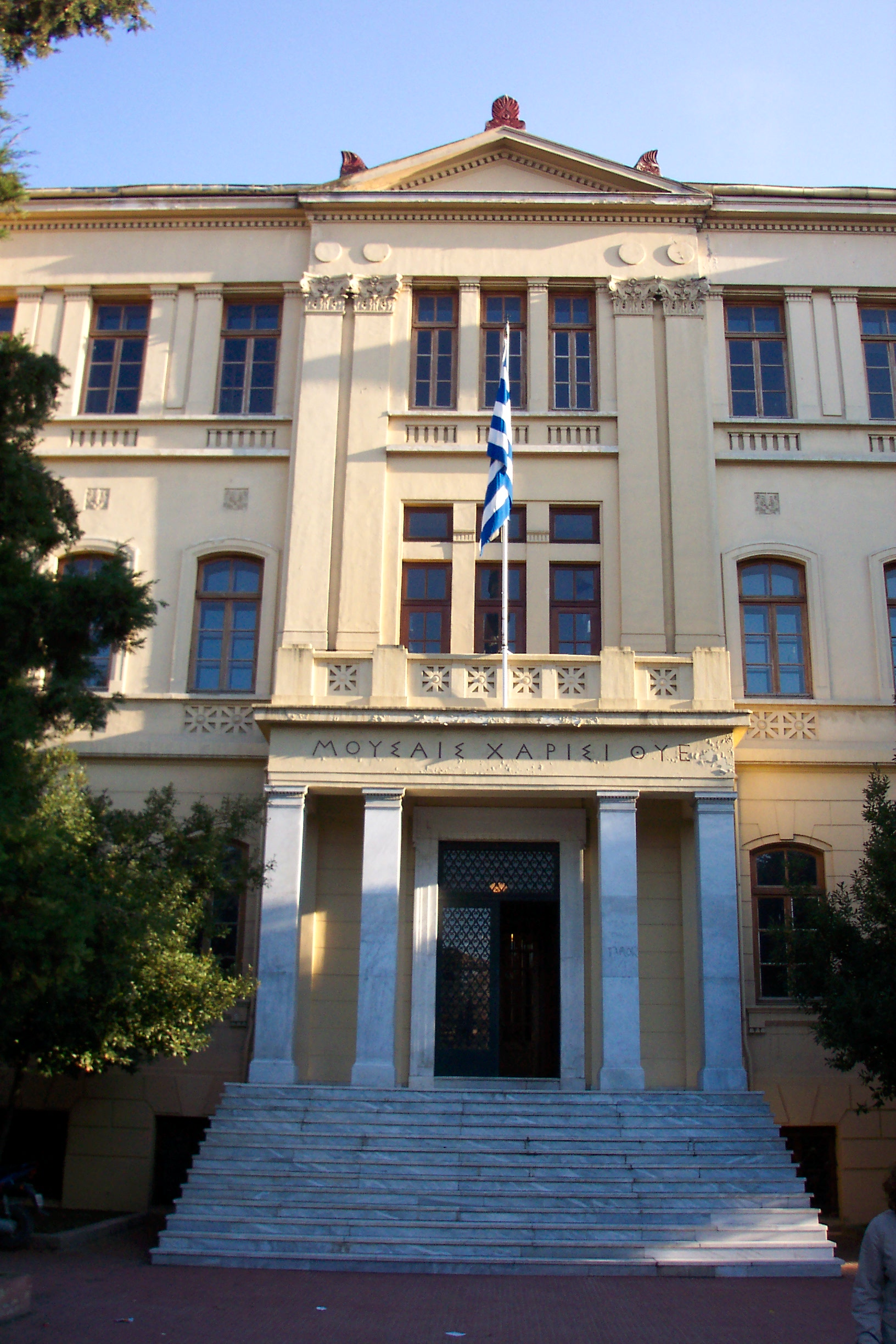
Faculty of Philosophy, AUTH

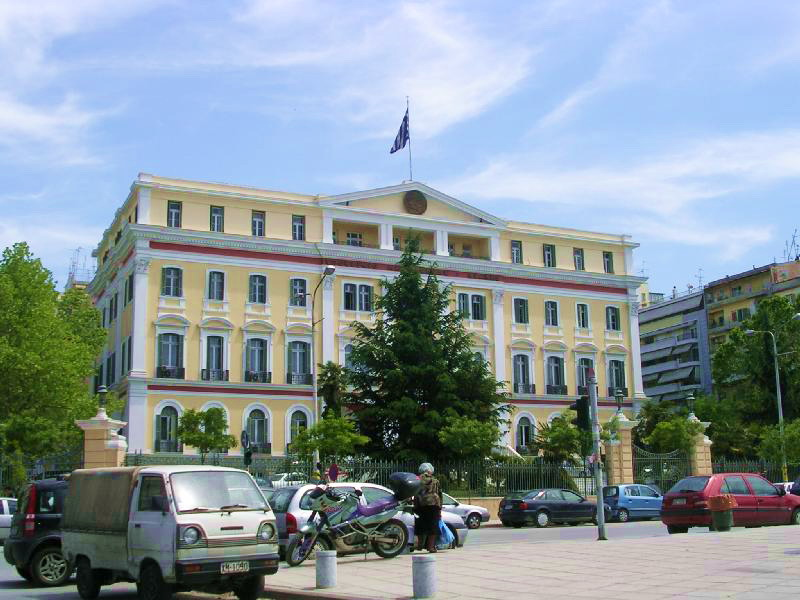
Government House

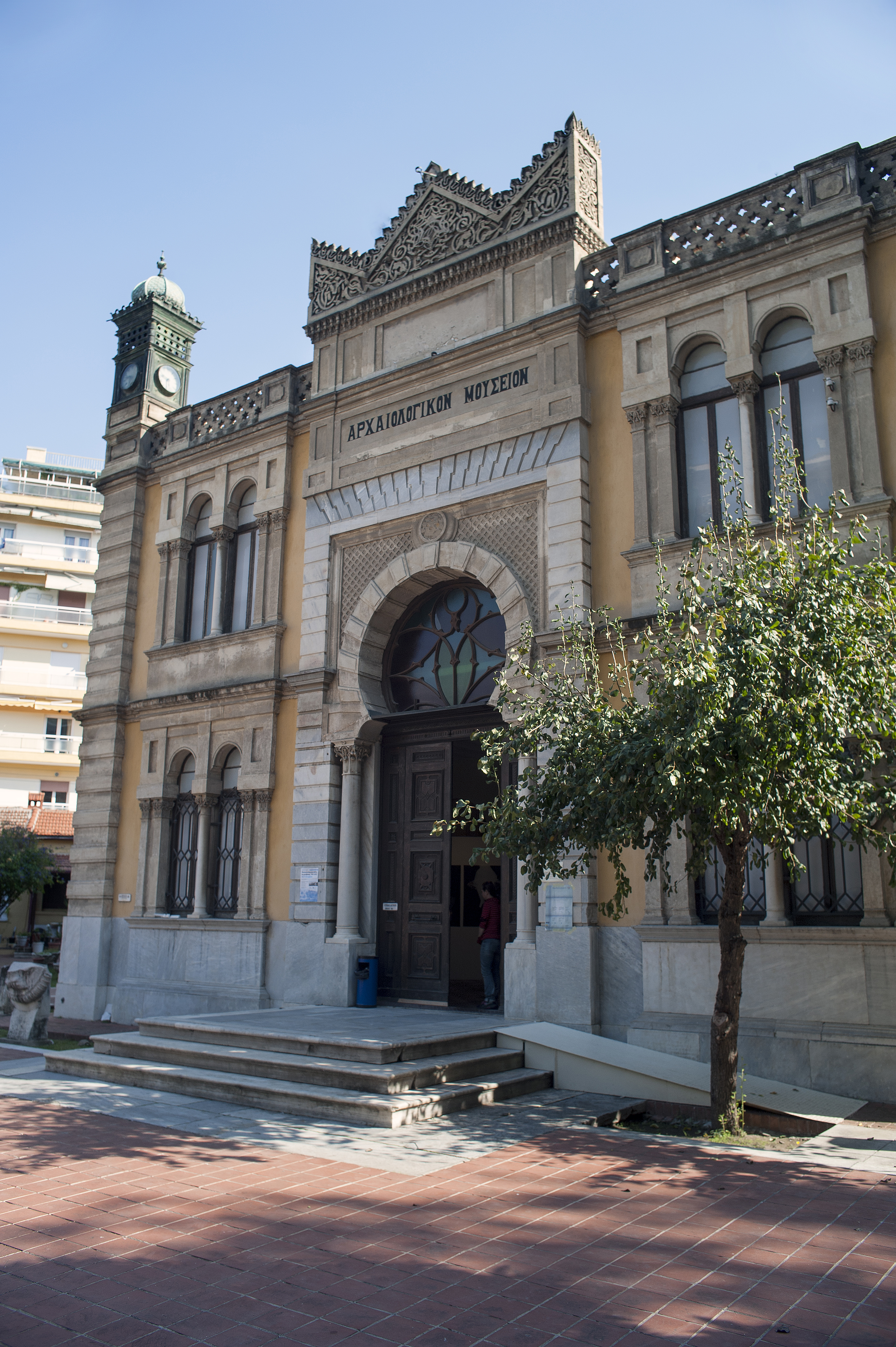
New Mosque

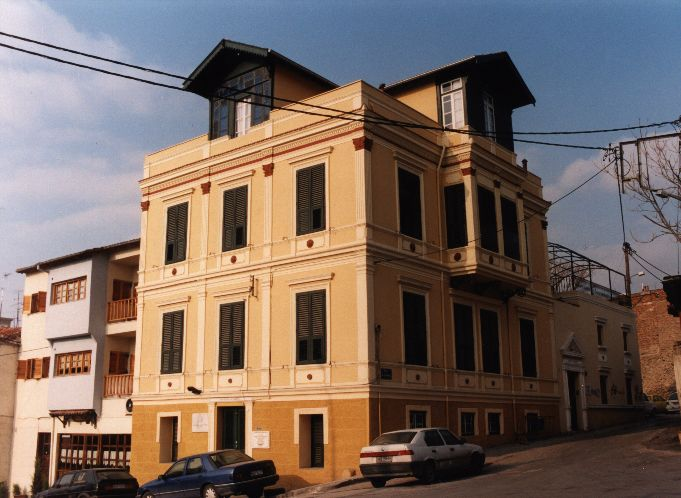
Karipeion Melathron

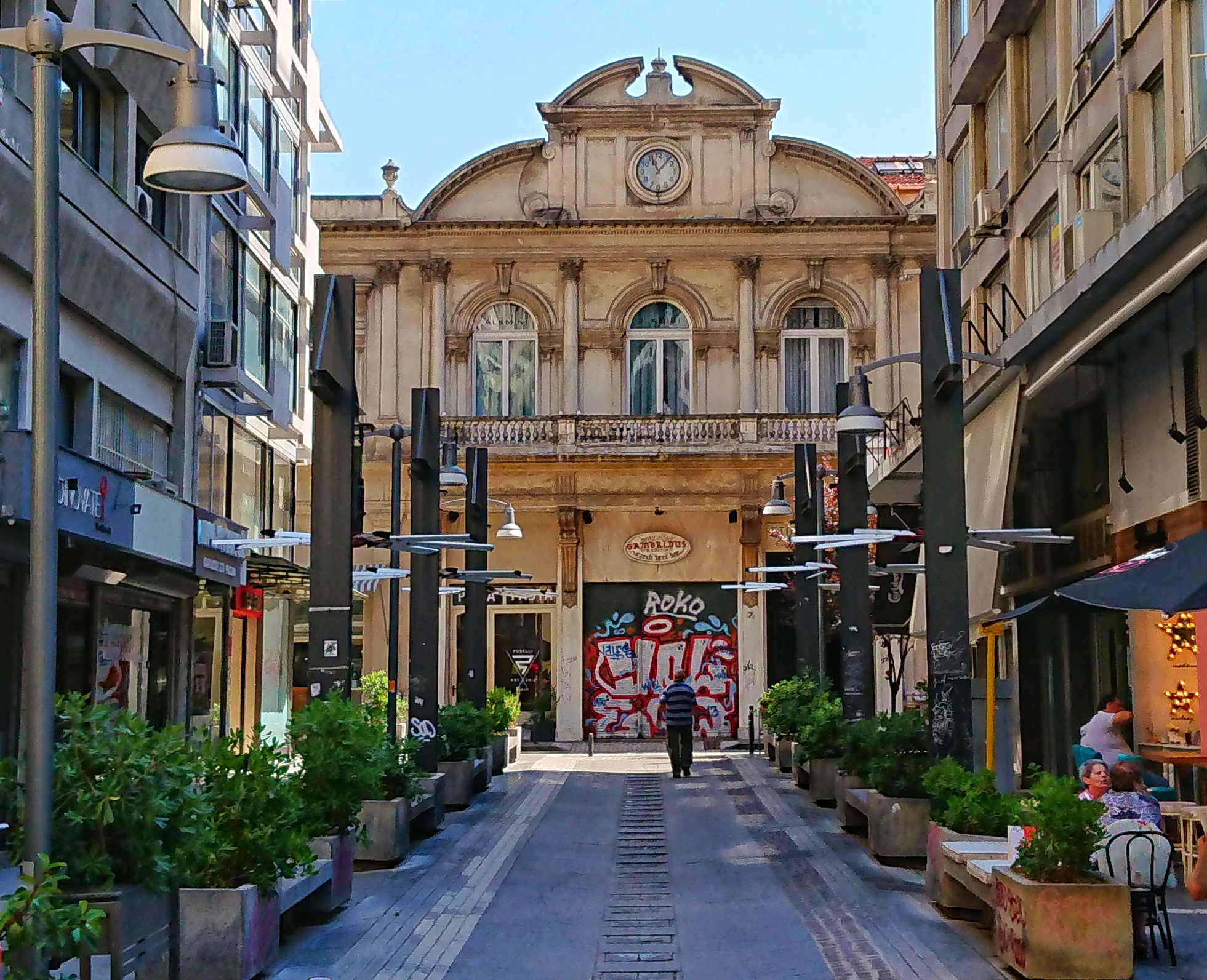
The old Banque de Salonique, often called stock exchange, in Stoa Malakopi

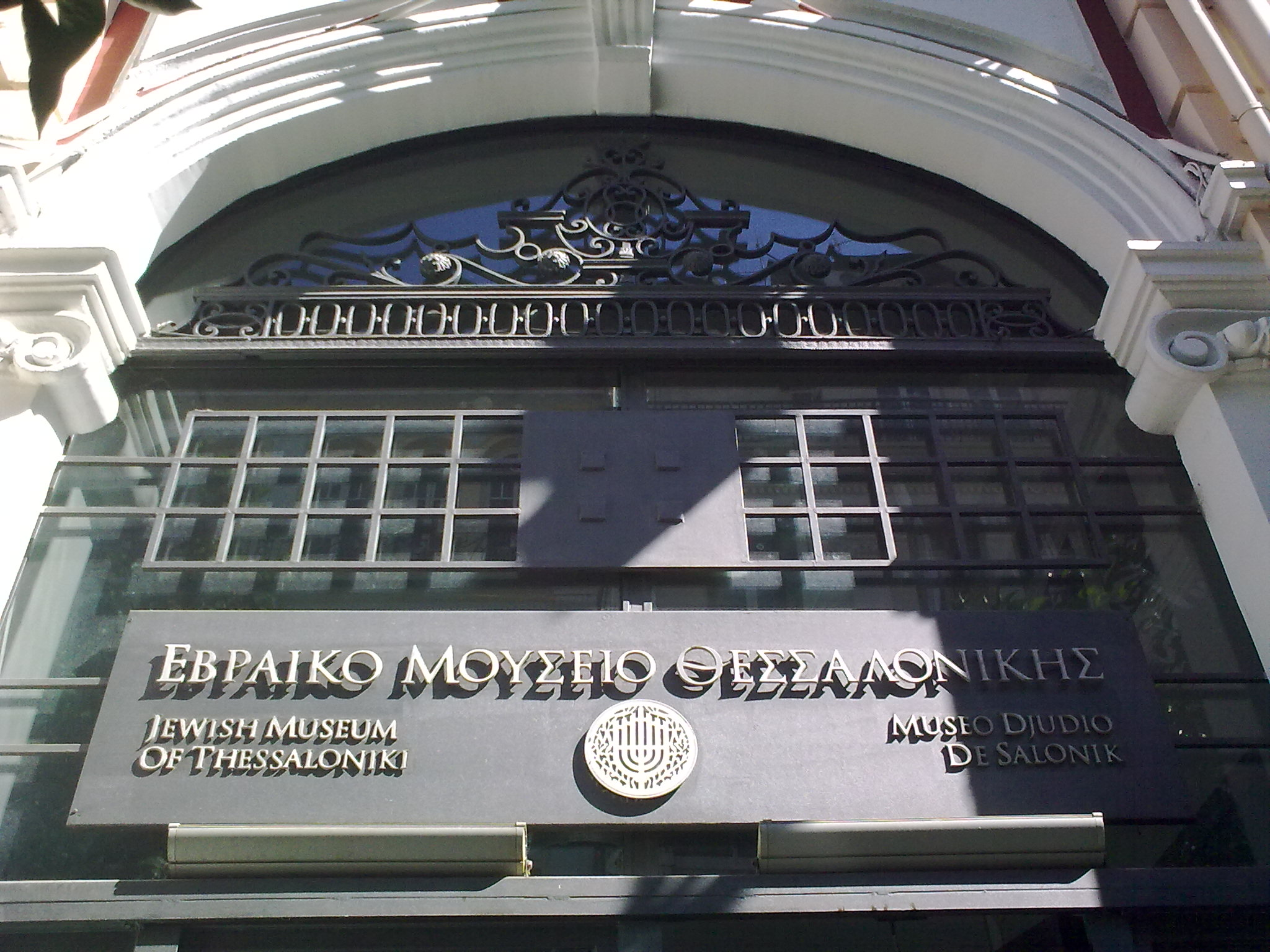
Jewish Museum of Thessaloniki

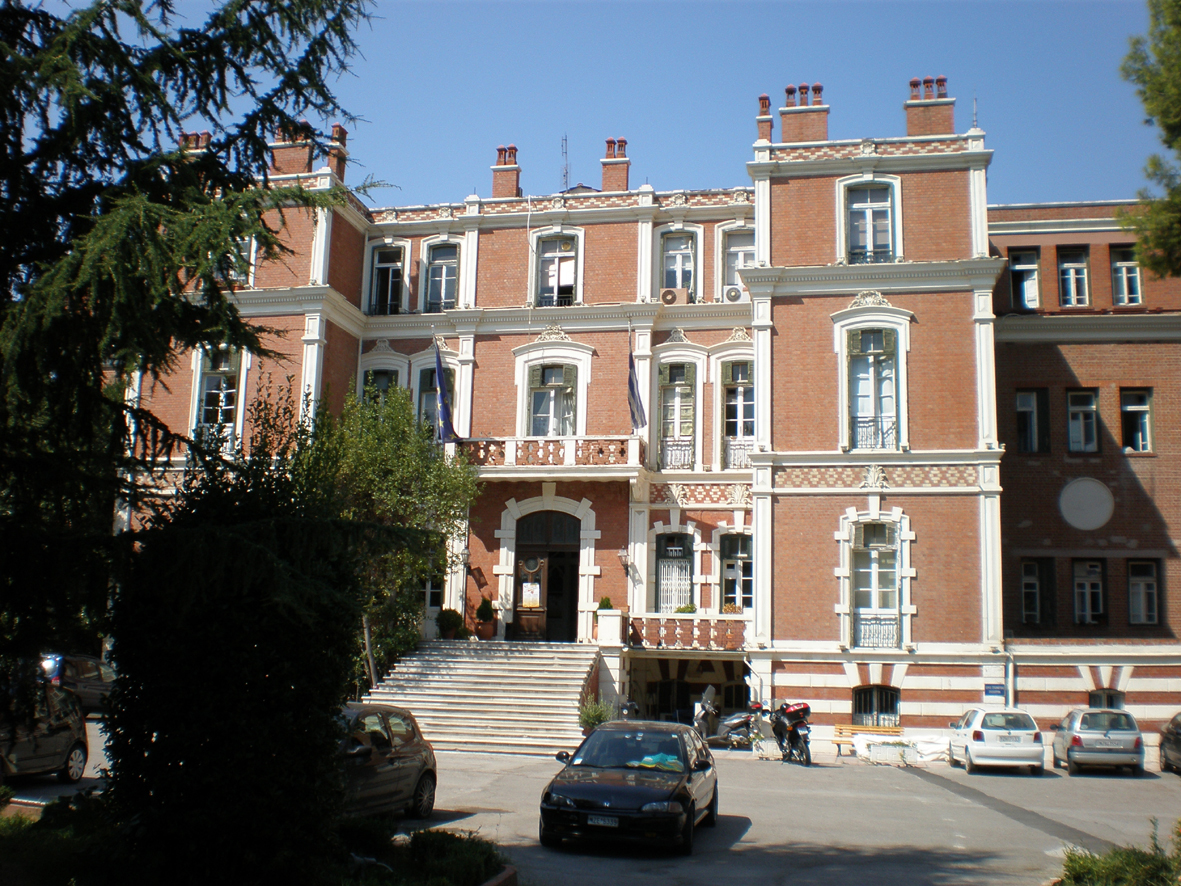
Villa Allatini

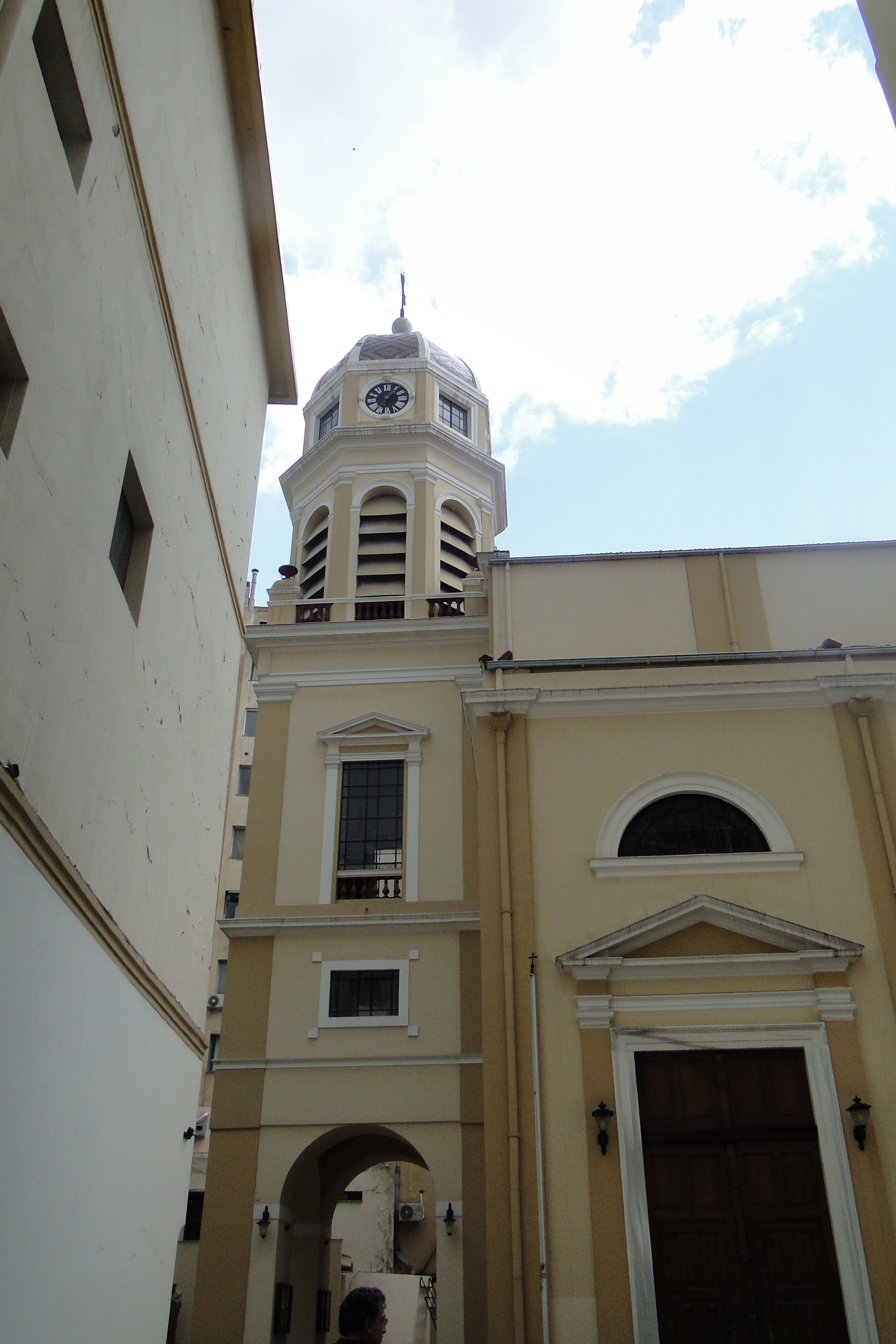
Catholic church of the Immaculate Conception

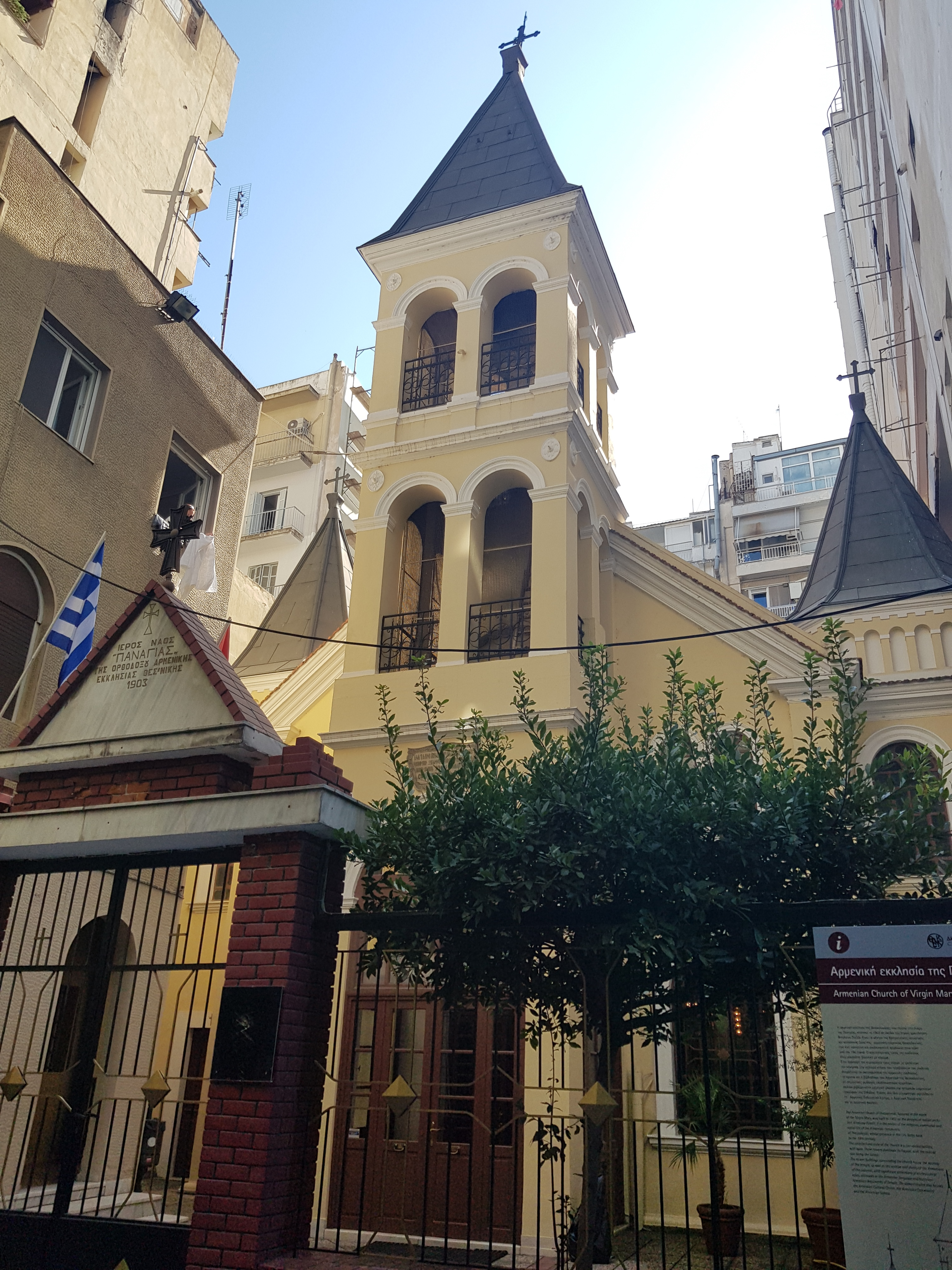
Armenian Church of Virgin Mary

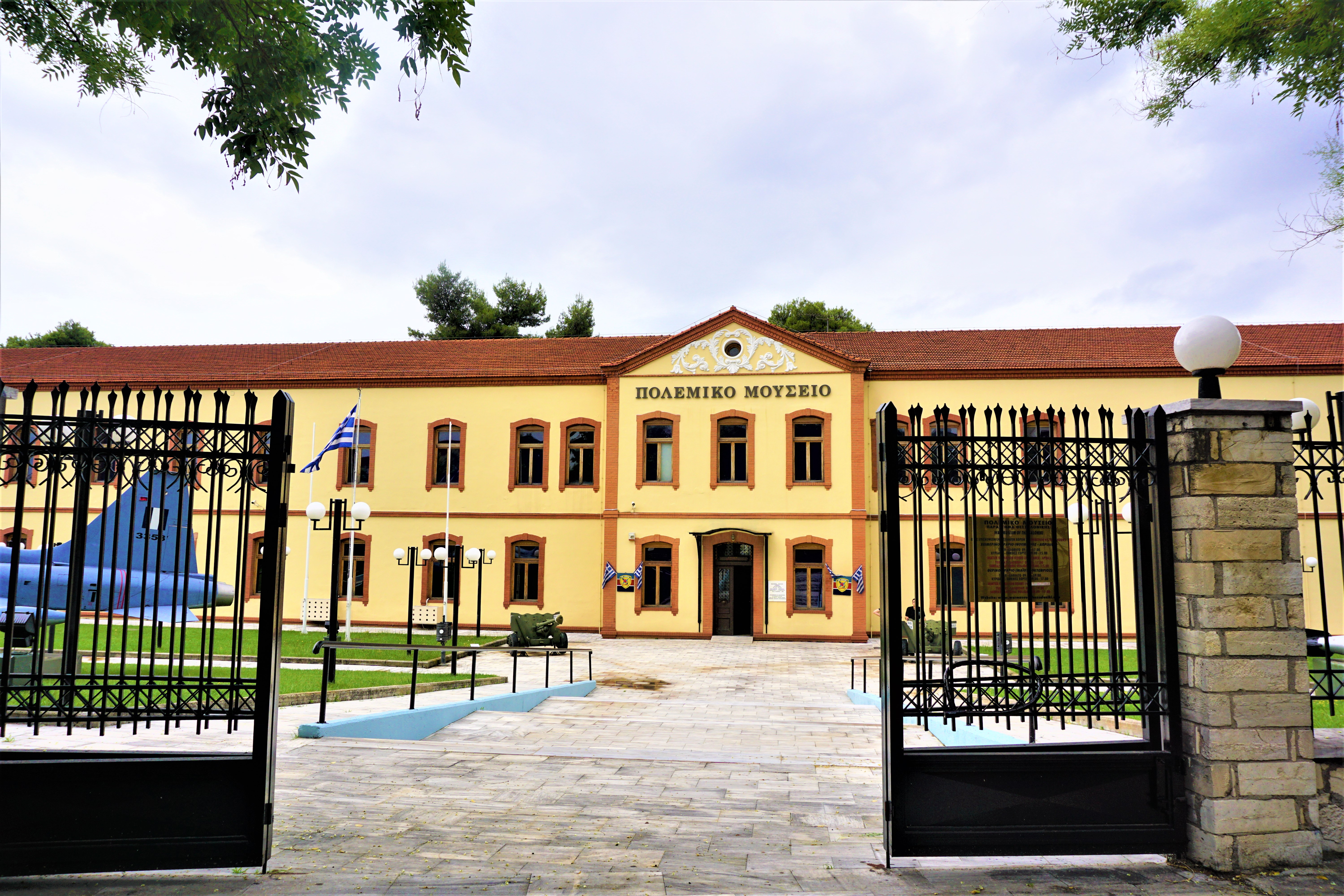
War Museum of Thessaloniki

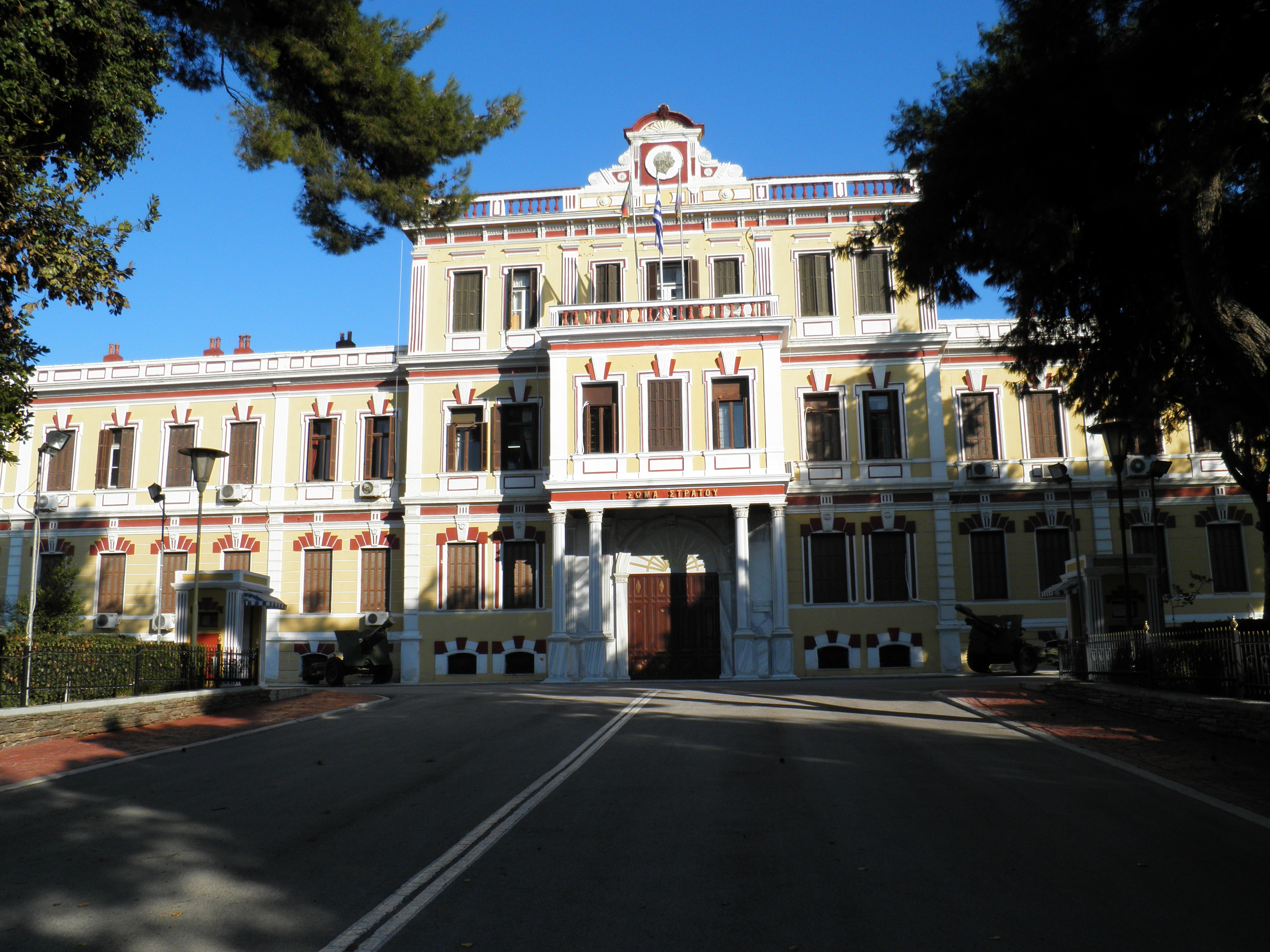
Army HQs

== Sources ==
- Mark Mazower, Θεσσαλονίκη: "Πόλη των Φαντασμάτων", εκδόσεις Αλεξάνδρια, 2006, ISBN 960-221-354-X
