= Yeni Mosque, Thessaloniki =

Mosque in Thessaloniki, Greece

Yeni Mosque
- Γενί Τζαμί
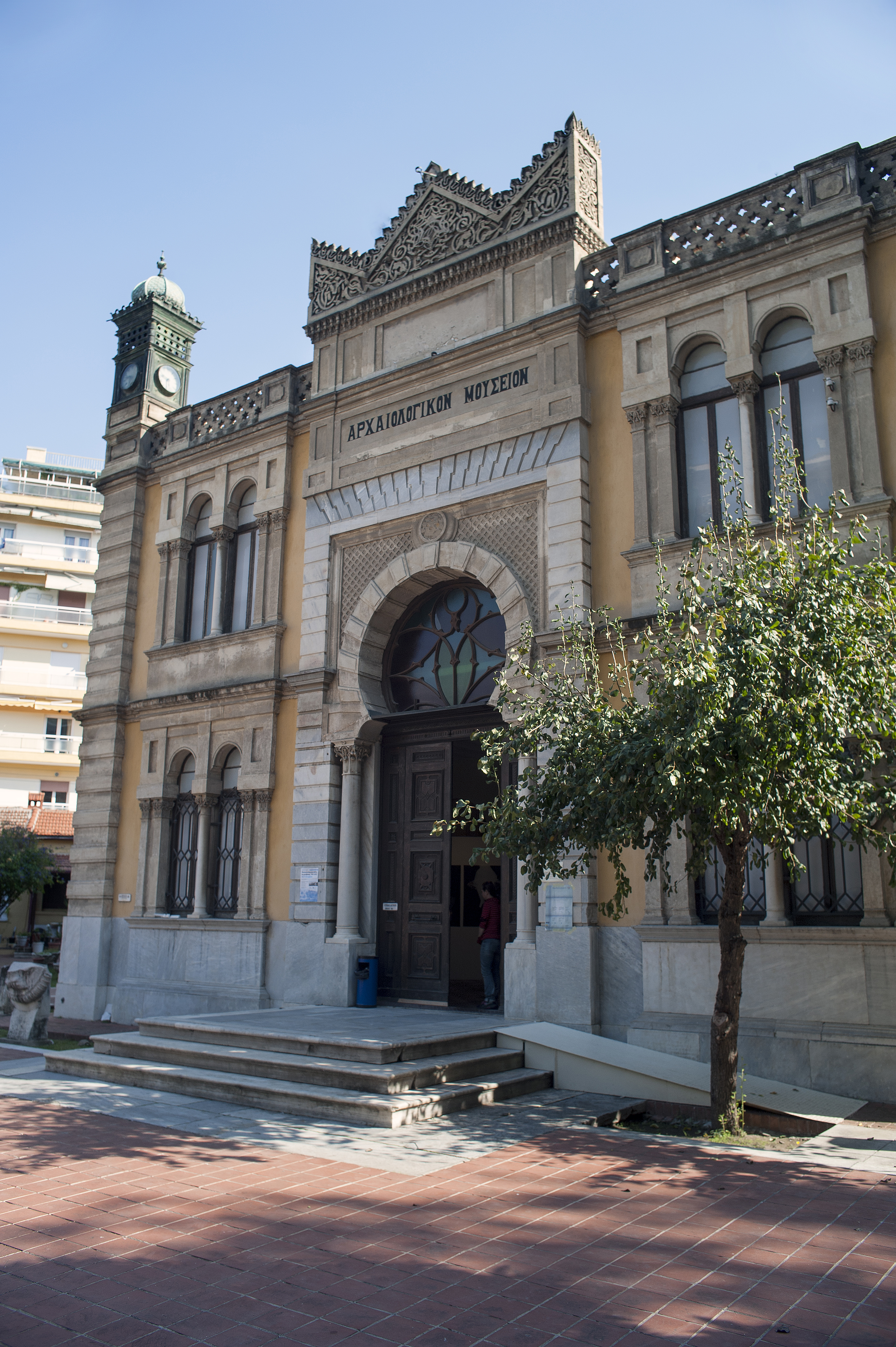
- The mosque in 2012

- Location of the mosque in Greece

Religion
- Affiliation: Islam
- Ecclesiastical or organizational status: Mosque: (1902–1923); (2012–present)
- Status: Abandoned (as a mosque); Repurposed (for cultural use); Re-opened (as a mosque) (Note: Only for major Islamic festivals)

Location
- Location: Thessaloniki, Central Macedonia
- Country: Greece
- Interactive map of Yeni Mosque
- Coordinates: 40°36′56″N 22°57′24″E

Architecture
- Architect: Vitaliano Poselli
- Type: Mosque
- Style: Ottoman; (with Baroque and Renaissance elements)
- Completed: 1902

Specifications
- Length: 23.3 m (76 ft)
- Width: 14.9 m (49 ft)
- Dome: 1
- Minaret: 1 (destroyed)
- Materials: Brick; stone

The Yeni Mosque (Greek: Γενί Τζαμί, from Turkish: Yeni Cami, lit. 'new mosque') is a mosque in the city of Thessaloniki, northern Greece. It was built by Italian architect Vitaliano Poselli in 1902, during the Ottoman era, for the city's Dönmeh community, crypto-Jewish converts to Islam. However, when the Dönmeh had to leave the city during the population exchange between Greece and Turkey, the mosque was abandoned.

Afterwards, it functioned as the city's archaeological museum for a brief time before the current museum's construction. The structure is owned by the municipality and served as an exhibition center, and was occasionally lent to the Muslim community of the city; the first occasion being for worship in 2012, some 90 years after it was closed. The mosque has occasionally reopened for major Islamic festivals during the 2020s.

== History ==
The Yeni Mosque was built in the Hamidiye district by an Italian architect, Vitaliano Poselli in 1902 for the city's Dönmeh community (crypto-Jews converted to Islam, who kept many Judaism elements), during which time they numbered around 10,000-15,000. It was the last mosque to be built in Thessaloniki during the Ottoman rule in the city, and the only one in its immediate district in the southeastern part of the city.

Following the 1923 population exchange between Greece and Turkey the Dönmeh had to leave the city as they were counted among the Muslim community; following their departure, the mosque was used as a shelter for Greek refugees from Asia Minor, before being shut down. The building was then used to house the Archaeological Museum of Thessaloniki from 1925 to 1962, before a different museum building was erected. It was first classified as a preservable monument in 1938, whereupon its minaret and fountain were demolished to make room for the museum's needs in free space; and it was acquired by the municipality of Thessaloniki in 1986.

It suffered some damage during the 1978 Thessaloniki earthquake, after which it was restored. It was further renovated in 1997 on the occasion of Thessaloniki becoming European Capital of Culture. Subsequently, the building was used for cultural purposes, including art exhibitions and various other cultural events.

=== Restoration as a mosque ===
In 2012, the mayor of the city, Yiannis Boutaris, sought to attract Muslim tourists and decided to re-open the mosque for worship during Ramadan. It was the first time in 90 years that the mosque was used for worship. At the request of the Greek Ministry of Education, Religious Affairs and Sports, an imam and a muezzin were assigned by the mufti of Xanthi, who is appointed by the ministry. Members of the Macedonia-Thrace Muslims' Education and Culture Association protested this decision and called for the people not to attend. After Ramadan, the mosque closed again and the imam and muezzin returned to Xanthi.

In April 2024 (and again in 2025) the mosque was re-opened for the city's Muslim population on the occasion of the Ramazan Bayram, which was preached in both Greek and Arabic by Egyptian imam Taha Abdelgalil. It was the first time in 102 years that celebrations for the Eid al-Fitr were held in Yeni Mosque.

== Architecture ==
The Yeni Mosque is an example of eclectic architecture with several Baroque and Renaissance elements that prevailed in Europe at the time, though at the same time it incorporated traditional Islamic architecture with neoclassical influences. Mark Mazower described it as "art nouveau meets a neo-Baroque Alhambra, with a discreet hint of the ancestral faith in the star of David patterns."

The building has a rectangular shape, measuring 23.3 by 14.9 metres (76 by 49 ft) externally. Its volume is divided into two parts, the higher of which contains the hemispherical dome and the prayer room, while the lower rectangular one has a four-pitched roof. Internally, it is divided into three room spaces at ground level; the main entrance leads to the taller rectangular space that contains the minaret's entrance and the staircase to the second floor on its southwestern side. A door connects the room to the vestibule, from where a staircase leads to the roof and the upper floor that runs around the prayer hall at dome height. The third space is the square prayer hall with a side of 13.7 metres (45 ft), which also contains the sacred mihrab, or the praying niche. The praying hall is separated from the vestibule by a colonnade consisting of two columns and pilasters.

The Ottoman and Italian inscription with Vitaliano Poselli's name, the sundial with instructions written in Ottoman Turkish, and the inscription above the mihrab are all preserved to this day. Additionally, owing to the times it was used as an archaeological museum, several ancient Greek, Roman and early Christian artefacts (such as marble sarcophagi and stelae) are lying outside, scattered in the mosque's courtyard.

The mosque, which is built to face the direction of Mecca, is located at an angle to the rest of the urban fabric and the plot it is built on.

== Gallery ==
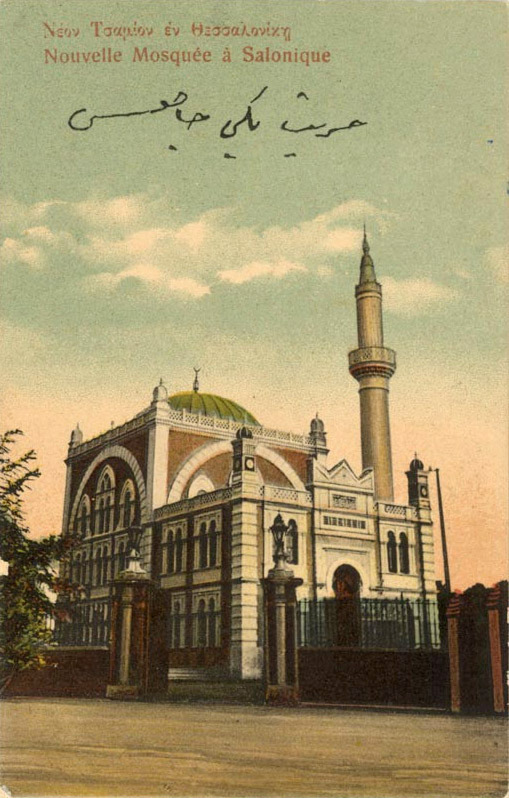
A postcard image of the mosque, 1902

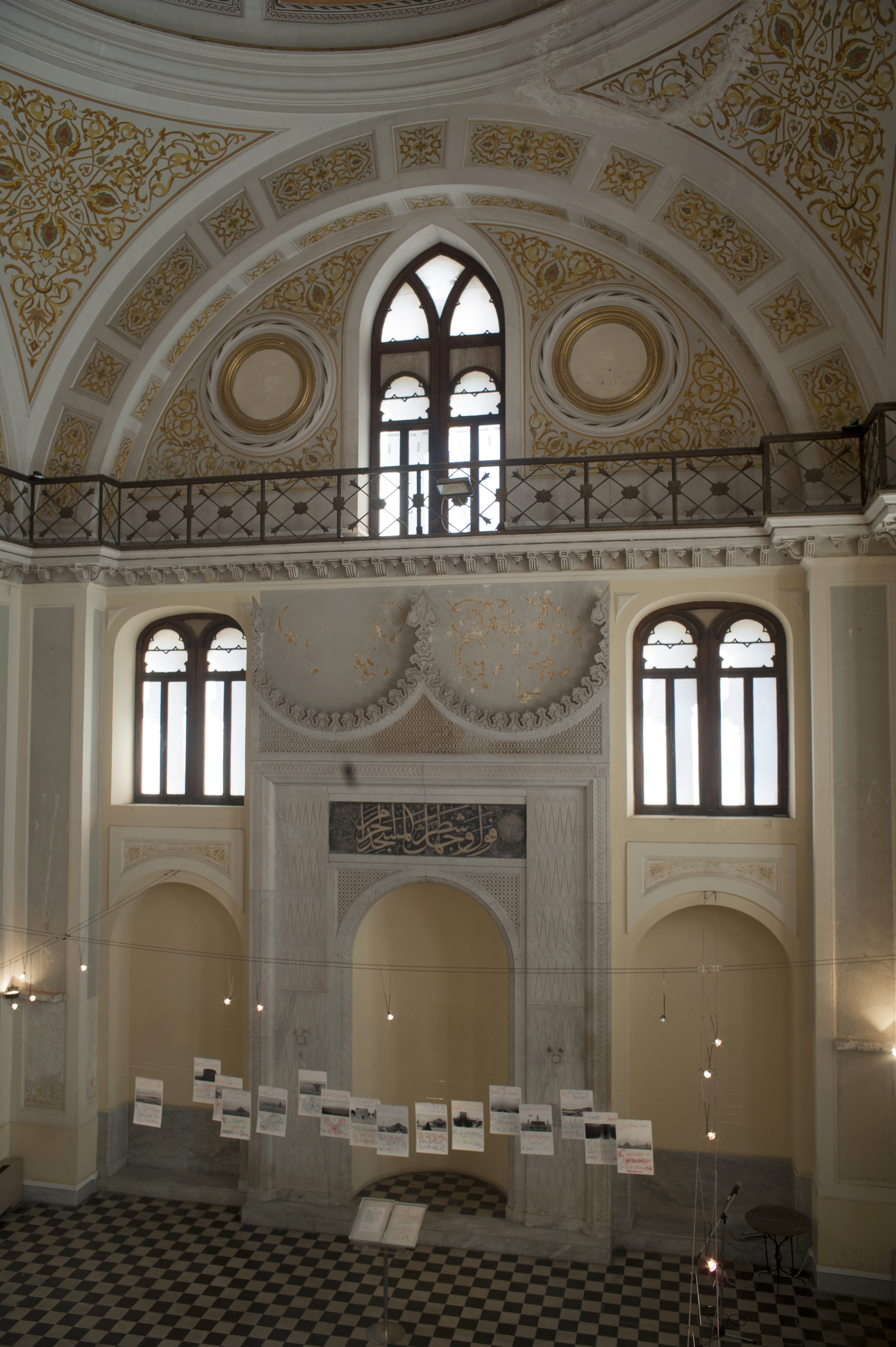
Mihrab, interior

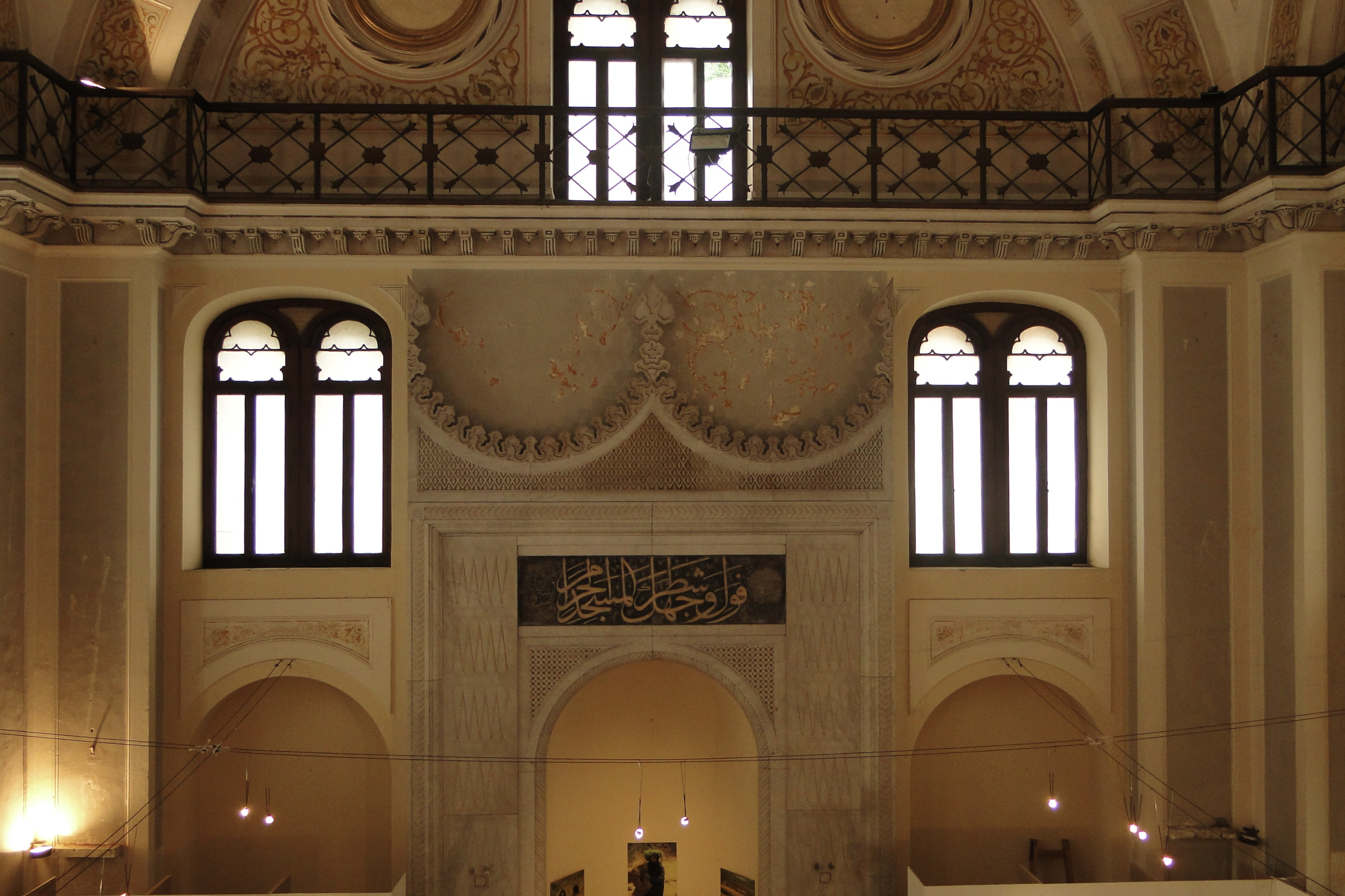
Interior

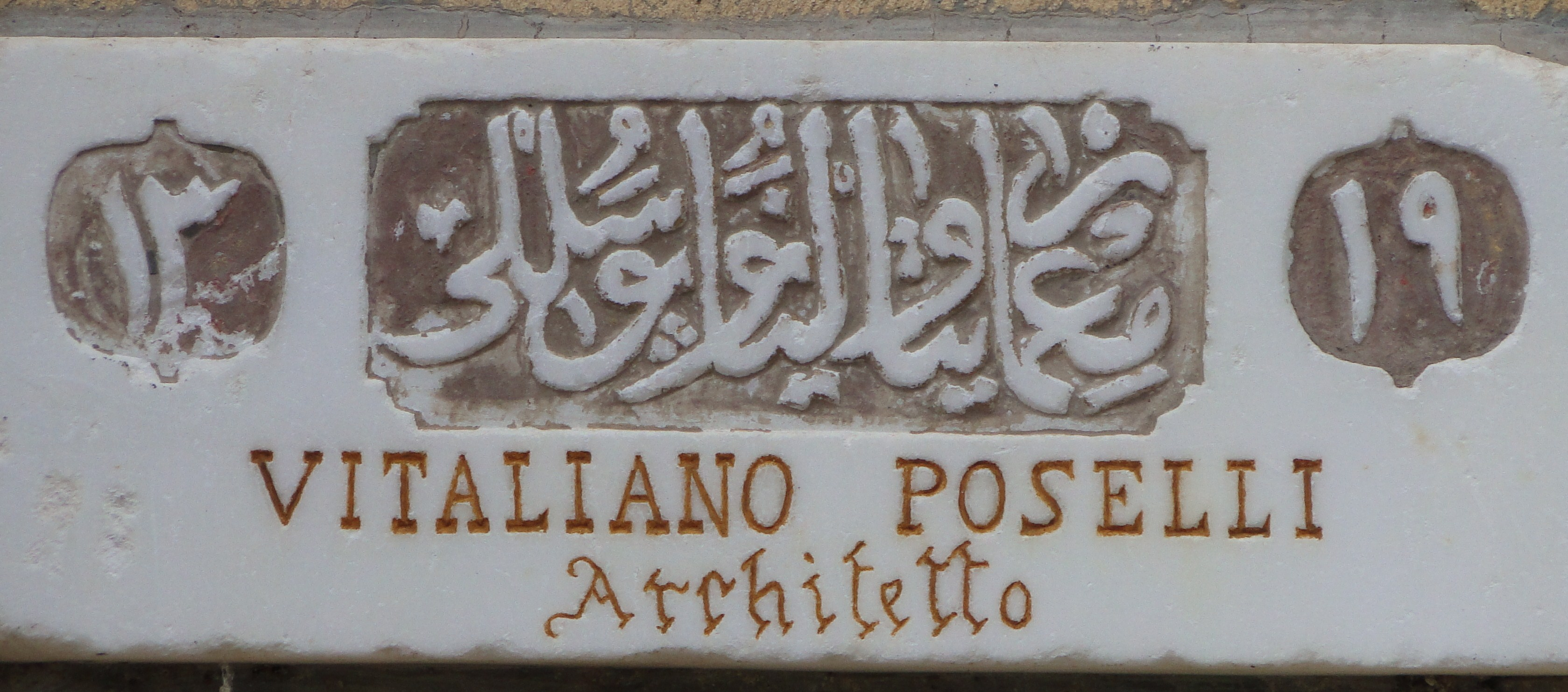
Seal

== See also ==
- Islam in Greece
- List of mosques in Greece
- Ottoman Greece
