= Allatini Mills =

Former industrial area in Thessaloniki, Greece

Coordinates: 40°35′47″N 22°57′8″E

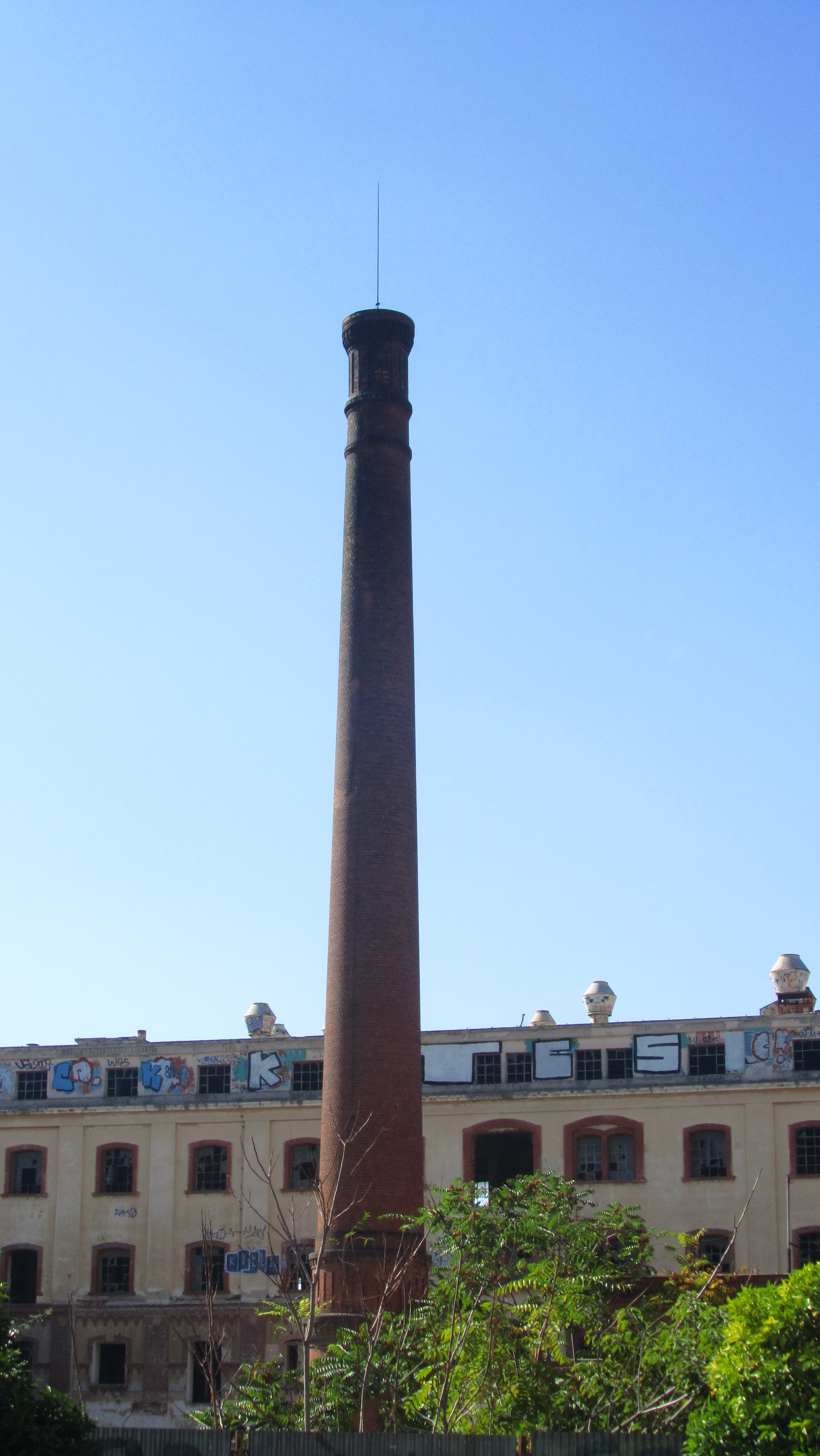
Abandoned chimney of the factory

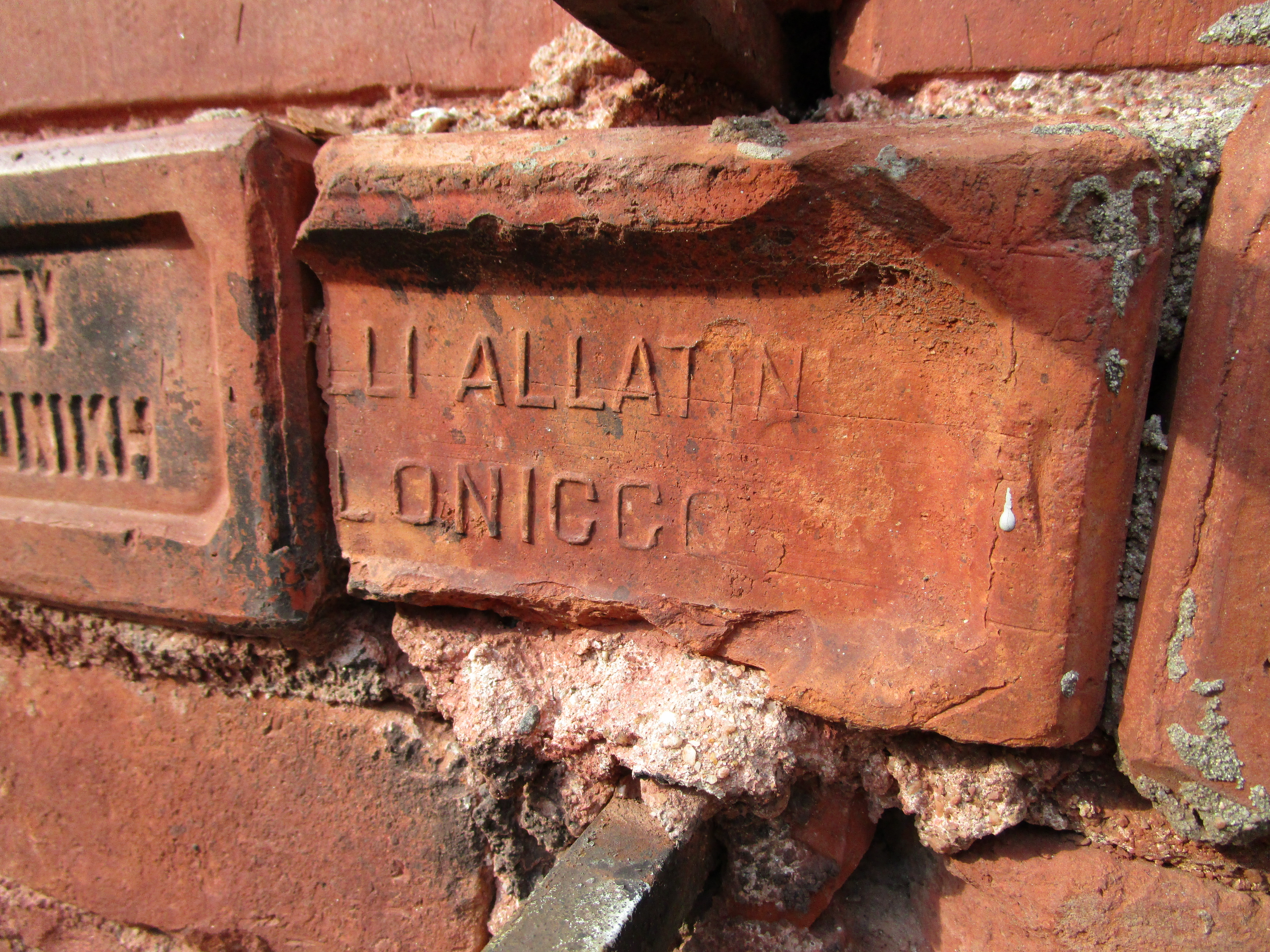
Allatini's brick. [FRATE]LLI ALLATINI [SA]LONICCO (Allatini Brothers, Salonica)

The Allatini Mills is a large former industrial area in the city of Thessaloniki, Greece near Kalamaria district. The name comes from the famous Allatini flourmills founded by the Allatini family in the late 19th century.

Moses Allatini operated a roller mill and pottery; his sons founded the Fratelli Allatini company. In 1854 they built the first steam mill in Thessaloniki, together with Darblay de Corblay; they acquired the whole property in 1882.

The present-day central building of the Mills was constructed in 1898 according to plans by Vitaliano Poselli after the previous building burnt down. It was inaugurated on 19 September 1900. The building complex includes the administration building (old residence), warehouses, refrigeration areas and the roller mill building, surrounded by the boiler room, the machine shop and the chimney of Belgian construction. The Allatini Mills was considered "one of the largest, if not the largest, industrial buildings in the Orient, and Poselli's most impressive work".

The historical complex, an example of industrial archeology, remains abandoned and awaiting redevelopment. It is characterized as historical scheduled monument and there are various plans for its restoration. The new Allatini industrial facilities are located in Sindos.
