= Karipeion Melathron =

Coordinates: 40.6421°N 22.9461°E

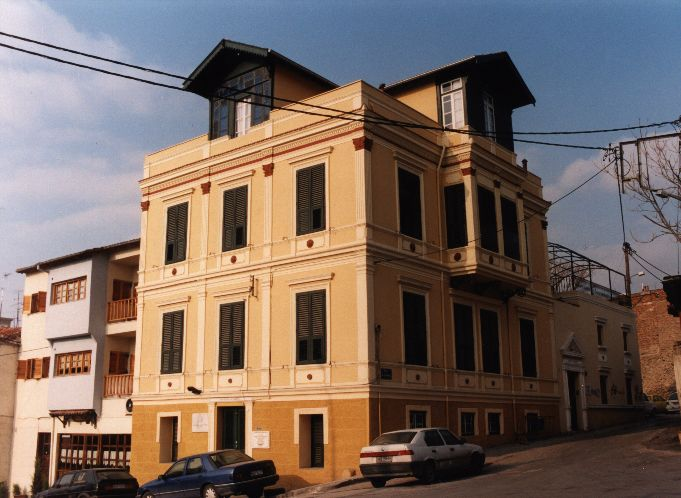
Karipio Melathro, Thessaloniki.

Karipeio Melathro (Greek: Καρίπειο Μέλαθρο) is an Ottoman-period historical building in the center of Thessaloniki, Greece. It is located in the crossroad of Olympiados and Stefaniou Dragoumi streets.

Its architect is the Italian Vitaliano Poselli. Karipio was the official residence of the then Selanik Prefect, who was the political representative of the Ottoman Empire in Macedonia. After Thessaloniki became part of Greece in 1912, the building became a property of the Greek State. In a 1980 decision, the Greek Ministry of Culture put Karipio under the status of its state protection. Today, the 4-stores building is the property of doctor Alexandros Karipis and home to the non-governmental Institute for National and Religious Studies.
