= Allatini (company) =

Greek flour milling company

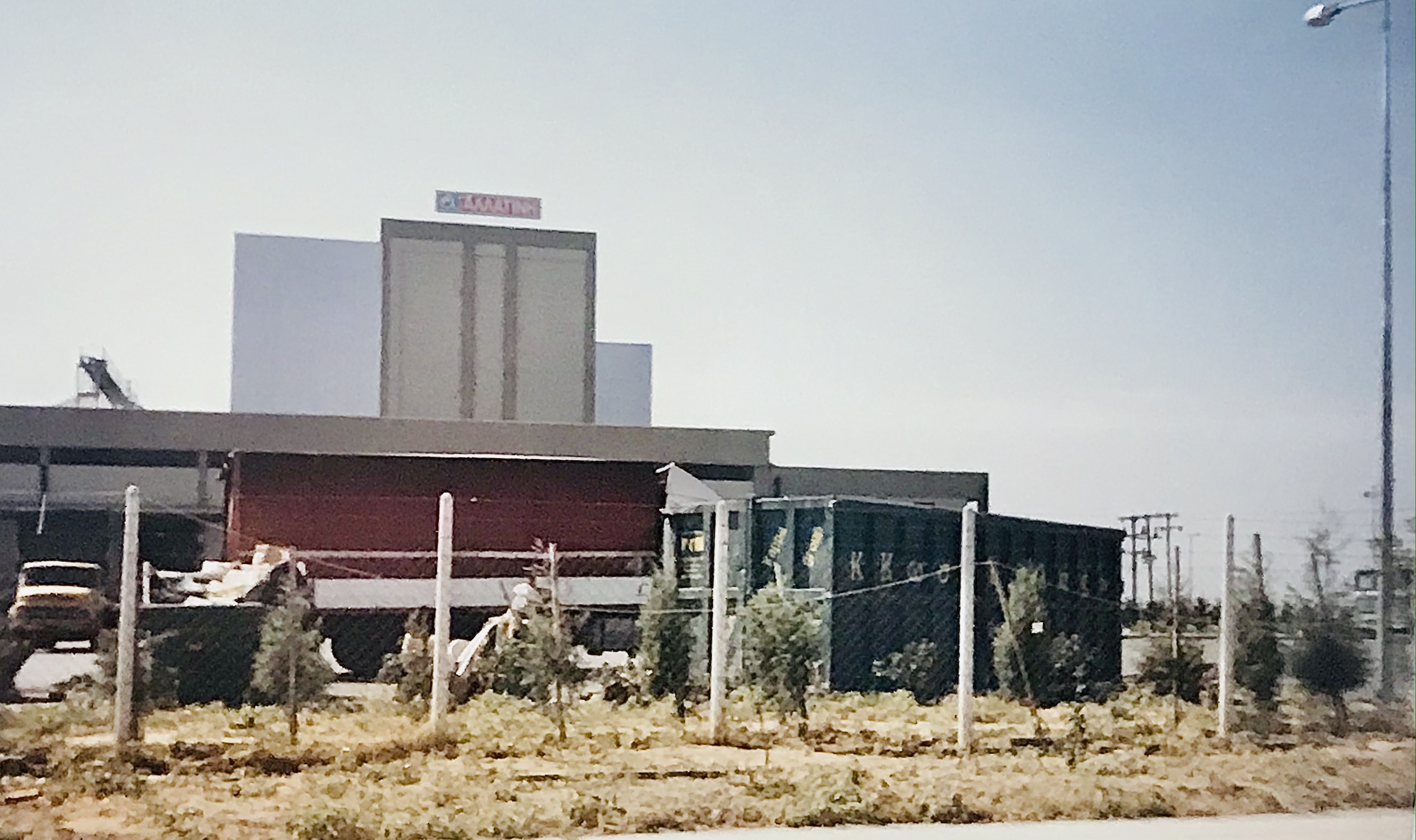
Allatini factory in Sindos

Allatini is the name of a historic flour milling company, founded in 1858 by Moses Allatini and his brother, in Thessaloniki, Greece.

The company had two industry sectors: ceramic production in Charilaou and flour mills in Kalamaria.

In the late 19th century, the Allatini family founded the famous Allatini flour mills, in a large industrial area of the city, near Kalamaria. During the following decades the company was expanded, and in the 1930s the mills were the biggest in the Balkans.

Since then, the company's ownership changed many times, but preserving its historic name. Today it is owned by ELBISCO Group and is notable for its biscuits. Its new industrial facilities are located in Sindos.

== Sources ==
- Allatini Mills
- ELBISCO
