= Aristotle University of Thessaloniki =

Tertiary education institution in Greece

Coordinates: 40°37′48″N 22°57′29″E

- Αριστοτέλειο Πανεπιστήμιο Θεσσαλονίκης
- Motto: Μούσαις Χάρισι Θῦε (Ancient Greek)
- Motto in English: Sacrifice to the Muses and the Graces
- Type: Public higher education institution
- Established: 22 June 1925; 101 years ago
- Accreditation: Greek University System (Ministry of Education)
- Affiliations: Campus Europae, Balkan Universities Network, Black Sea Universities Network, Utrecht Network, TIME, CESAER, EASN
- Budget: €15 million (2024)
- Chancellor: Kyriakos Anastasiadis
- Vice-Chancellor: Ioannis Rekanos Nikolaos Magioros Iakovos Mihailidis
- Faculty: 2,700
- Students: 90,299
- Undergraduates: 76,987
- Postgraduates: 8,496
- Doctoral students: 4,609
- Location: Thessaloniki (main campus), Thermi, and Serres, Central Macedonia, Greece
- Campus: 230,000 m^{2} (2,500,000 sq ft)
- Colours: Red ochre
- Website: auth.gr
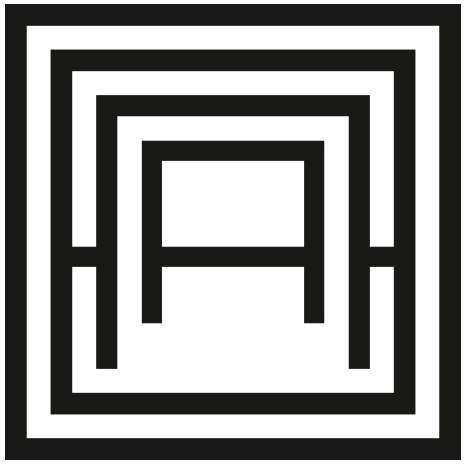

The Aristotle University of Thessaloniki (abbr. AUTh; Greek: Αριστοτέλειο Πανεπιστήμιο Θεσσαλονίκης (ΑΠΘ), romanized: Aristotéleio Panepistī́mio Thessaloníkīs, lit. 'Aristotelian University of Thessaloniki'), often called the University of Thessaloniki, is the fifth oldest tertiary education institution in Greece. Named after the philosopher Aristotle, who was born in Stageira, about 55 kilometres (34 mi) east of Thessaloniki, it is the largest university in Greece and its campus covers 230,000 square metres (2,500,000 sq ft) in the centre of Thessaloniki, with additional educational and administrative facilities elsewhere.

As of 2023, it has approximately 88,283 active students enrolled at the university (77,198 at the undergraduate level and 6,588 in postgraduate programmes of which 3,952 at doctoral level) and 2,366 faculty members. There are additionally 248 members of the Laboratory Teaching Staff and 213 members of the Special Technical Laboratory Staff. The administrative staff consists of 400 permanent employees and 528 subcontractor employees that are contracted by the university.

The language of instruction is Greek, although there are programs in foreign languages and courses for international students, which are carried out in English, French, German and Italian.

== History ==
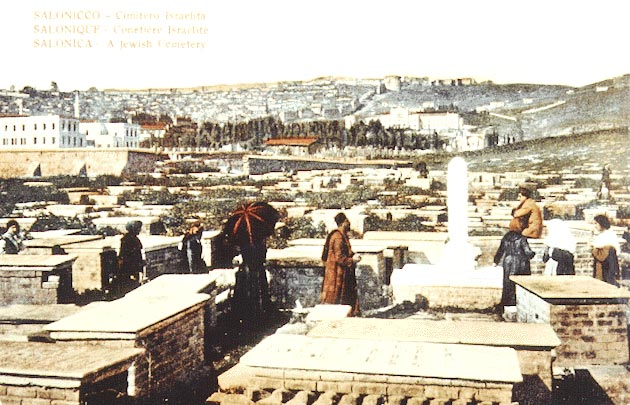
The university was built over the Jewish cemetery of Salonica

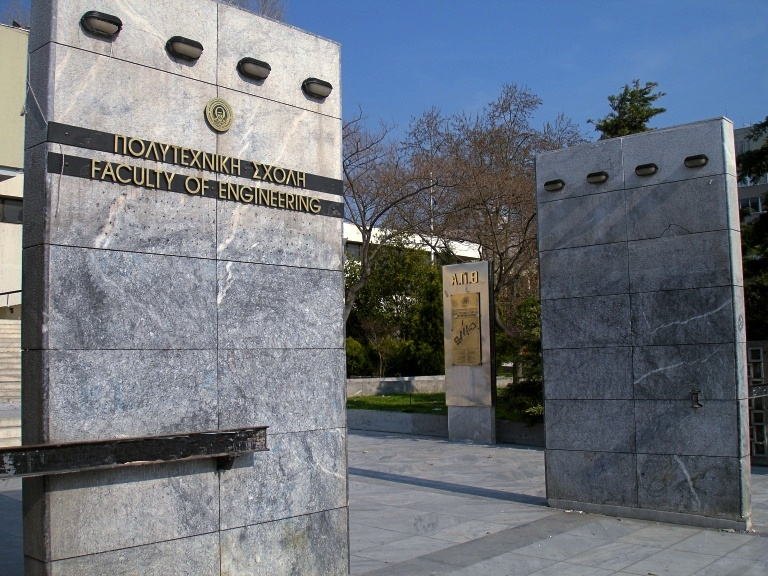
The gate of the university's Faculty of Engineering

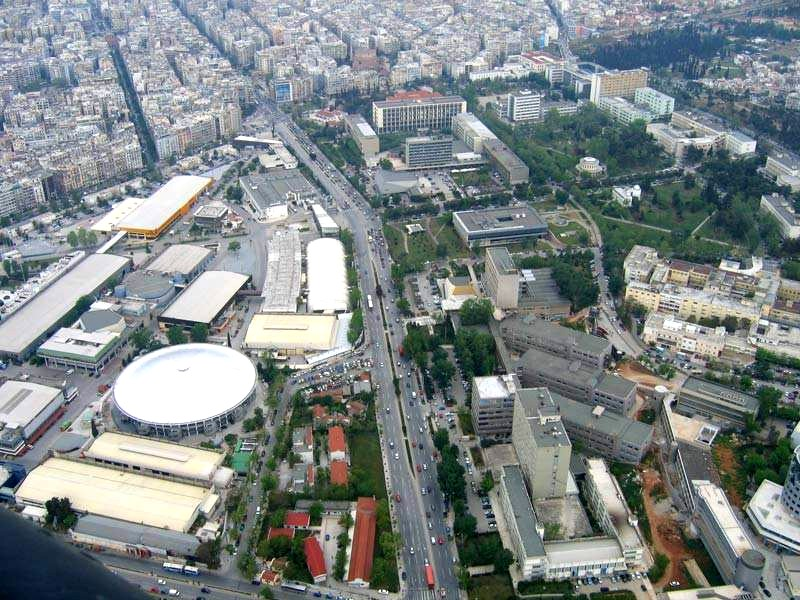
Aerial view of central Thessaloniki. On the right the Aristotle University's campus

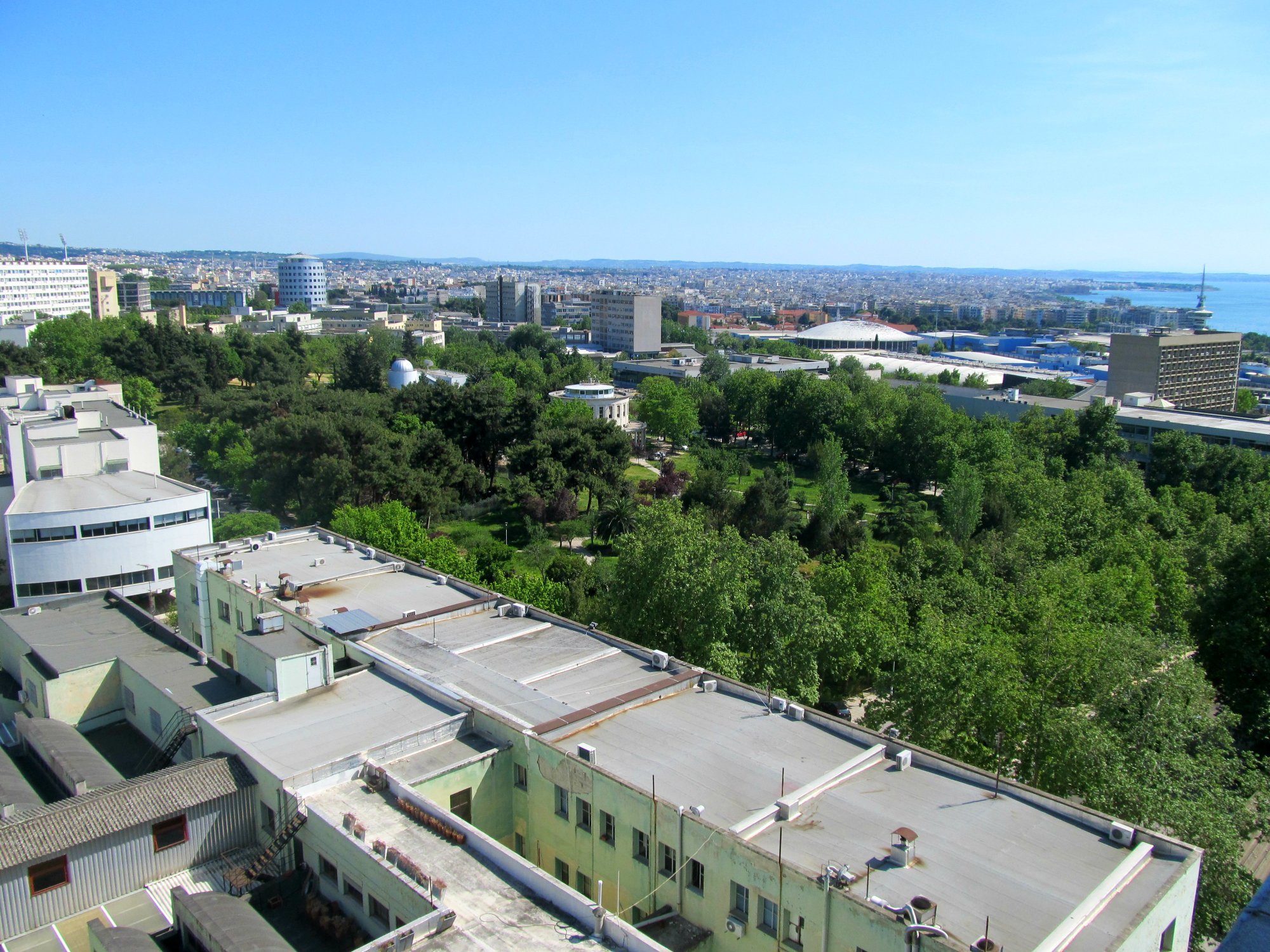
The campus from the Biology building roof

The Aristotle University of Thessaloniki was founded in 1925 during the premiership of Alexandros Papanastassiou and was legislated under Law 3341/14-6-25. It was the first Greek university to be founded outside of Athens. The university was built on top of the remains of what had once been the Jewish cemetery in Thessaloniki, until the cemetery's destruction during the Nazi occupation. Gravestones from the Jewish cemetery were used as building materials in the construction of the university.

According to Eleftherios Venizelos' plans following the end of the World War I, Smyrna was intended to be the seat of the second Greek university, while the third university was to be established in Thessaloniki. However, Smyrna was not part of Greece at the time and the plans fell through after the outcome of the Greco-Turkish War in Asia Minor. Nevertheless, in 1924, Alexandros Papanastassiou decided to found a university in Thessaloniki in order to boost the local economy and culture.

The chronological development of the university, which was renamed the Aristotle University of Thessaloniki in 1954, can be divided into three stages, each covering a period of approximately 25 years.

=== First stage (1926–1950) ===
During the first stage of its operation (1926–1950), the development focused on those schools which were generally accepted as constituting one educational institute, namely the Faculty of Philosophy, the Faculty of Physics and Mathematics, the Faculty of Law and Economics, the School of Theology and the Medical School. The first stage of development ended with the foundation of the Faculty of Veterinary Medicine in 1950, which was the only faculty of veterinary medicine in Greece for many years. After this period, some of the aforementioned faculties were extended by integrating more departments. In more detail, the Departments of Pharmacy and Dentistry were founded in 1955 and 1959 respectively and they were incorporated into the Medical School. Moreover, the Faculty of Philosophy was expanded by integrating the Institutes of Foreign Languages (English, French, German and Italian).

=== Second stage (1951–1975) ===
During the second stage (1951–1975) the focal point of development was the Faculty of Engineering, also known as the Polytechnic Faculty. At the beginning, this faculty constituted an independent institute also called the Polytechnic or Technical University. Therefore, for the first fifty years of its operation the Aristotle University consisted of two distinct institutes which operated independently. Subsequently, these two educational institutes were unified. The various schools within the Faculty of Engineering were founded in the following order: School of Civil Engineering (1955–56), School of Architecture (1956–57), School of Rural and Surveying Engineering (1962–63), School of Mechanical and Electrical Engineering (1972–73), School of Chemical Engineering (1972–73), School of Mathematics, Physics and Computational Sciences (1982–83) and School of Urban-Regional Planning and Development Engineering (2004). The School of Mechanical and Electrical Engineering was split in two independent schools (School of Mechanical Engineering and School of Electrical and Computer Engineering) in 1976.

=== Third stage (1975–present) ===
Finally, during the third stage of its development (1975-today), new schools and departments were founded along with the aforementioned engineering schools. Moreover, the university acquired a small number of departments which operated in the past as independent institutes of higher education. During this period, the Faculty of Fine Arts was established, along with all its constituent schools (Drama, Film Studies, Music Studies, Visual and Applied Arts). Additionally, the School of Journalism and Mass Media Studies and the School of Physical Education and Sports Sciences were created as independent schools. Overall, the third stage of development of the Aristotle University is characterized not only by the establishment of new faculties, schools and departments, but also by many major changes in the structure of the university itself. These changes include the downgrade of some former faculties into schools or departments and the upgrade of others.

Today, the Aristotle University comprises 12 faculties, 36 schools, and numerous other units (e.g. laboratories, study rooms, libraries, clinics and research centres), which make it the largest university in Greece and southeastern Europe in terms of number of staff, undergraduate and postgraduate students and the facilities offered. According to the significant Jewish past and present of Thessaloniki the Aristotle University planned together with the Jewish community of Thessaloniki in 2014, the reopening of the Faculty of Jewish Studies. A former Jewish faculty was abolished 80 years before by the Greek dictator Ioannis Metaxas. This new faculty took in October 2015, her work on with leading professor Georgios Antoniou.

On the university campus a monument commemorating the old Jewish cemetery was unveiled in 2014. The monument consists of grave stones in a bed of grass alongside a broken Jewish menorah. The campus was built partially on this old cemetery. The memorial has been vandalized several times.

== Emblem ==
The emblem of the Aristotle University is St. Demetrius of Thessaloniki.

== Departments and faculties ==
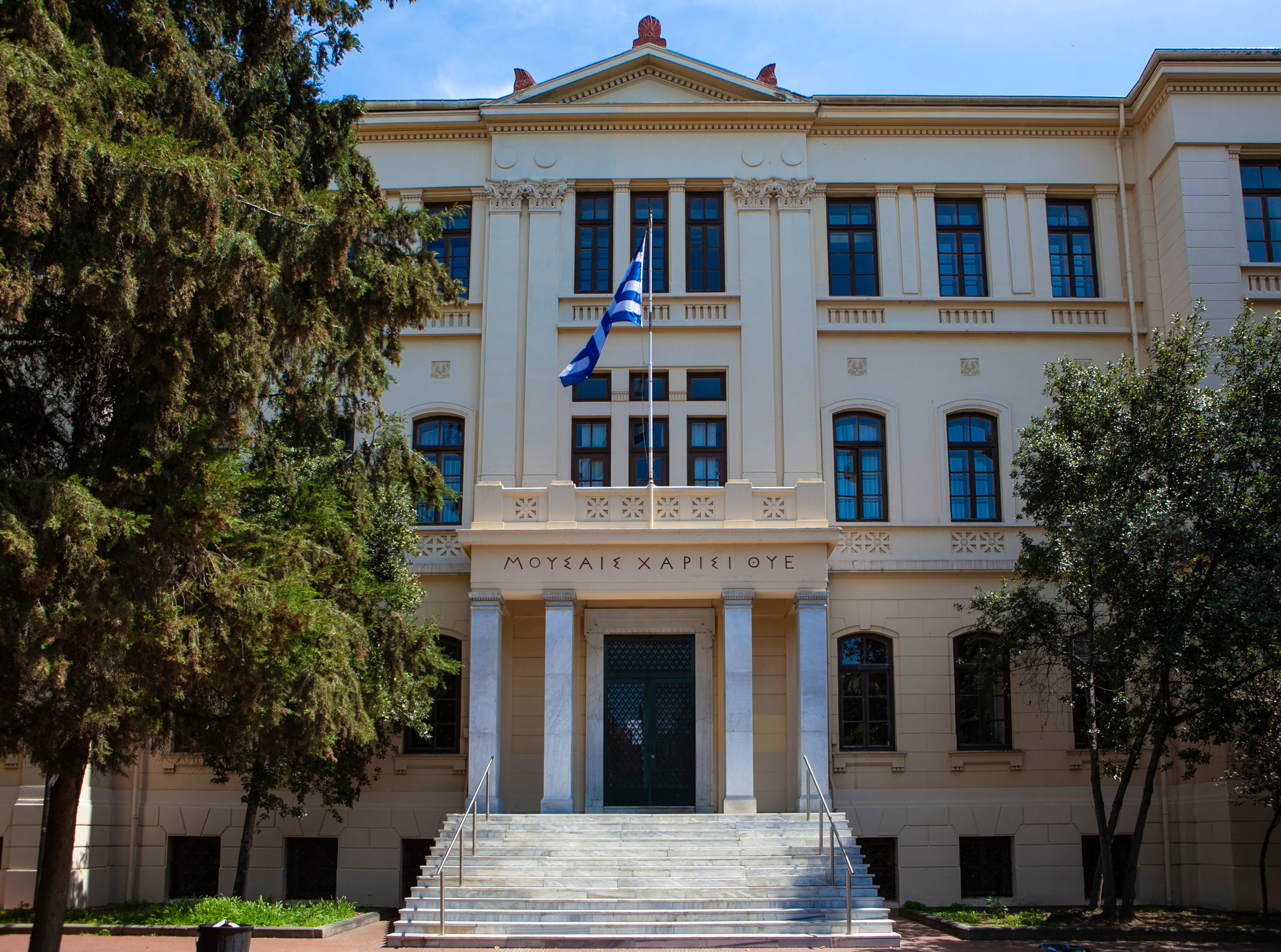
The Faculty of Philosophy, the oldest building of the university campus (1888), designed by Vitaliano Poselli. The university's motto is engraved on the entrance.

The university consists of eleven faculties, consisting of 41 schools.

Schools	Departments
Faculty of Sciences (founded 1925)	School of Mathematics (founded 1928); School of Physics (founded 1928); School of Biology (founded 1973); School of Chemistry (founded 1943); School of Geology (founded 1973); School of Informatics (1992)
Faculty of Engineering (Polytechneio)	School of Electrical and Computer Engineering (founded 1976); School of Mechanical Engineering founded (1976); School of Architecture (founded 1956); School of Civil Engineering (founded 1955); School of Chemical Engineering (founded 1972); School of Rural and Surveying Engineering (founded 1962); School of Spatial Planning and Development (founded 2004)
Faculty of Health Sciences	School of Medicine (founded 1942); School of Pharmacy (founded 1955); School of Dentistry (founded 1959); School of Veterinary Medicine (founded 1950)
Faculty of Philosophy	School of Philology (founded 1984); School of History and Archaeology (founded 1926); School of Philosophy and Education (founded 1984); School of English Language and Literature (founded 1951); School of French Language and Literature (founded 1954); School of German Language and Literature (founded 1960); School of Italian Language and Literature (founded 1960); School of Psychology (1993)
Faculty of Law	School of Law (founded 1930)
Faculty of Agriculture, Forestry and Natural Environment	School of Agriculture (founded 1927); School of Forestry and Natural Environment (founded 1927)
School of Education	School of Early Childhood Education (founded 1984); School of Primary Education (founded 1986)
Faculty of Physical Education and Sport Sciences	School of Physical Education and Sports Science (founded 1983); School of Physical Education and Sports Science (Serres) (founded 1985)
Faculty of Fine Arts (founded 1984)	School of Drama (founded 1992); School of Film (founded 2004); School of Music Studies (founded 1985); School of Visual and Applied Arts (founded 1984)
Faculty of Social and Economics Sciences	School of Economics (founded 1928); School of Political Sciences (founded 1999); School of Journalism, Media and Communications (founded 1991)
Faculty of Theology	School of Theology (founded 1941); School of Social Theology and Christian culture (founded 1982)

History and affiliations of schools

- The School of Urban-Regional Planning and Development Engineering is located in Veria.
- Part of the School of Physical Education and Sports Sciences is located in Serres.
- The School of Medicine is strongly associated with the AHEPA University Hospital.
- Philosophy is typically taught in conjunction with Pedagogy on Greek Universities, unlike foreign counterparts.

== Research ==
The Aristotle University of Thessaloniki performs significant research in a variety of scientific fields. It is in cooperation with universities, organizations and research centres both in Greece and abroad. The large number of its faculties and its approximately 250 laboratories enable scientists of the Aristotle University of Thessaloniki to carry out a variety of research projects. During the past 12 years, 4500 research programs were undertaken and realized with the participation of more than 10,000 members of the academic community and several external collaborators.

During the past three years, 985 researchers – distinguished scientists – have provided educational and research services in collaboration with a total of 7,263 external scientific associates for the implementation of 3,151 International, European and National Research and Technological Development (RTD) projects. 1,436 of these partners were universities, research centers and organizations, while 405 were businesses.

Based on recent data from international ranking lists, of 20,372 higher institutions in the world, AUTh moved from the 407th position in 2011 to the 158th in 2012, ranking first among 23 Greek universities. As of 2011, Greece ranks first in the lists for the expenditure per publication per capita as a percentage of GNP, and second (following Ireland) in regard to the amount invested in scientific publications per country (Nature "Top Countries 2011: Scientific Publications").

In terms of promoting innovation, 32 Patents have been granted during the last 3 years on a national, European and international level.

Finally, AUTh is currently involved in establishing new infrastructure, setting up technology transfer systems, and creating an Interdisciplinary Research Center, in order to facilitate the selection process, as well as the implementation, placement and financing of research projects.

The A.U.TH. Research Committee is a university body which coordinates the research done at the university. It was established in order to satisfy the special needs of research activity and to administer the "Special Account of Research Funds", allocating funding resources to different research programs.

== Rankings and academic evaluation ==
University rankings

Global – Overall
- ARWU World: 501–600 (2023)
- QS World: =485 (2026)
- THE World: 801–1000 (2024)
- USNWR Global: =363 (2023)

Aristotle University of Thessaloniki is among the most prestigious universities in Greece.

An external evaluation of all academic departments in Greek universities was conducted by the Hellenic Quality Assurance and Accreditation Agency (HQA), giving it the "Worthy of merit" final overall evaluation.

Despite the university's good reputation within Greece, internationally the university currently performs averagely on major international rankings. Once best university in Greece, it is currently ranked 650-700th in the latest (2023) QS rankings, further progressing to the 530th place for the year 2024, and 801-1000th in Times Higher Education. Also, the university is placed amongst the universities with the best graduate employability in Greece, being placed only in the 501+ range in the world in world graduate employability rankings. Finally, CWTS Leiden ranking places AUTh as the 299th best university in the world for the year 2023.

== Organization and administration ==
The Aristotle University is one of Greece's public universities and therefore it is a legal entity with full self governance. It is primarily state-funded and functions under the supervision of the Greek Ministry of National Education and Religious Affairs. Other financial resources for the university are donations from individuals, participation in various EU research programmes and profits generated through management of the university assets. No fees are charged to the students of the university, except for international students studying medicine in English. With tuition fees reaching up to €6000 per semester.

The university administration consists of departments that make decisions within the framework of Greek law. The main objectives of the administration are to ensure the proper function of the university and to benefit the academic community as a whole.

=== Hierarchy ===
Every Greek public university comprises the faculties and the faculties comprise the schools. A school covers a basic scientific area and thus is considered to be the basic academic unit. Every school is subdivided into departments, which are responsible for the teaching of a specific part of the school's scientific area. Moreover, schools have substantial autonomy in educational matters and therefore they are mainly responsible for planning and implementing educational programs and granting degrees.

=== Administrative authorities ===
==== University Senate ====
The highest administrative authority is the University Senate. It consists of the following members (senators):

- The rector and the three vice-rectors.
- The deans of the various faculties.
- The chairmen of the various schools.
- Representatives of the associate professors, assistant professors and lecturers.
- Representatives of the special laboratory teaching staff and the administrative staff.
- Representatives of the undergraduate and postgraduate students of every faculty.

==== Rector's Council ====
The second highest administrative authority is the Rector's Council, which comprises the rector, the three vice-rectors, one student representative and one representative of the administration staff. Each member of the Rector's Council is elected every five years.

==== Rector ====
The rector is the president of the University Senate and the main representative of the university in various national and international bodies. Moreover, he or she is responsible for developing an overall strategy for the development of the university and for implementing the decisions taken by the Senate and the Rector's Council. Both the rector and the three vice-rectors are elected every three years in university-wide elections where all faculty, staff and student representatives vote. Each vice-rector has different administrative responsibilities, among which are: staff management, financial planning and development, academic affairs.

==== Faculty, school and department administrative bodies ====
Every faculty, school and department has its own administrative body, the members of which are democratically elected on the basis of collective processes. In more detail, decisions on academic, financial and administrative matters within a single department are made by the department's general assembly, which consists of faculty members and student representatives. The decision-making process often involves the creation of ad hoc committees.

== Staff ==
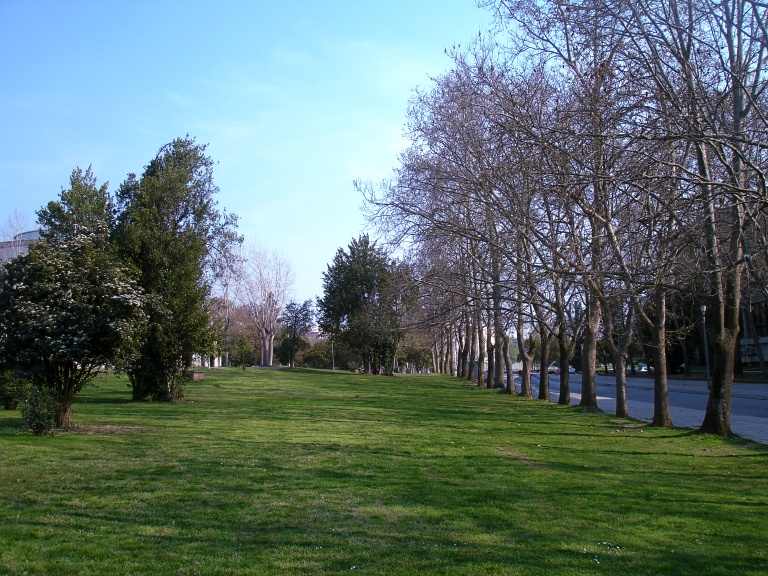
The university campus

The university staff is divided into five main categories:

- Teaching research staff: The staff in this category undertakes the majority of the teaching and research work done in the university. It comprises professors, associate professors, and assistant professors. Lecturers (rank abolished) also belong in this category. These four levels were established under law 1268/1982 and to advance to a higher level, one must show significant teaching and research work.
- Laboratory teaching staff: The members of this category are administering the university laboratories and they undertake special applied and laboratory teaching work. Holders of a doctoral degree who are members of this rank can independently teach courses and supervise undergraduate and post-graduate theses, in the same way as the Teaching research staff members do.
- Special teaching staff: Members of this category carry out special educational-teaching work, e.g., teaching foreign languages or Greek as a foreign language, physical education, design as well as other fine and applied arts.
- Special technical laboratory staff: They are responsible for keeping the laboratory equipment in good condition. They also provide specific technical laboratory services and help with the teaching laboratory.
- Administrative staff: This category comprises all employees working in administrative positions.

The educational work is also exercised by people who do not belong to the university staff, such as guest professors and generally scientists who are invited to teach specific courses.

== University units ==
The campus of the Aristotle University covers 230,000 square metres and is located near the centre of the city of Thessaloniki. The majority of the university units is found inside the campus, but there are also various institutions, laboratories, and facilities of the university which are located outside the campus such as the Centre of Byzantine Researches, veterinary clinics, the university farm, and forest reserves. The following are some of the most important university units of the Aristotle University:

=== Library ===
The main library's reading room

The Aristotle University Library was founded in 1927 and is constituted of two main elements: The Central Library is housed in a separate building at the centre of the university campus; "departmental libraries" are owned by a university department. These two elements comprise the A.U.Th. library system, where more than 800,000 book titles and 300,000 volumes of periodicals can be found. The A.U.Th. library subscribes to 3,500 periodicals from all over the world.

The Central Library has a reading room for students and a reading room for university researchers and teaching personnel. The students' reading room has a capacity of approximately 1,300 students and can be used by any student who brings and reads his own books.

Every department of the university has its own departmental library where students can find books, periodicals, and information concerning the specific subjects their department deals with. Every departmental library has a reading room whose opening hours are determined according to the needs of the department's students and staff.

The Aristotle University Library is nowadays the second largest library in Greece, after the National Library. Since 1976 the library has been a member of International Federation of Library Associations and Institutions (IFLA), which enables it to lend and borrow books from libraries all over the world.

=== Student Club ===
The University Student Club is housed in a private building located on the eastern side of the campus and plays a very important role in student life. Inside the Student Club is a restaurant, a reading room, a medical service, a snack bar, and a hairdresser's shop. There is also a musical department and a photography club.

The Student Club is responsible for the catering and medical care of the students of A.U.Th. and University of Macedonia. Every day it caters for approximately 12,000 students. Among its other responsibilities, it also organizes artistic, cultural and athletic events and maintains a chorus and a musical department.

=== Sports centre ===
The university gym is located on the eastern side of the university campus, next to the Student Club. It covers an area of 220,000 square metres and was initially founded in 1925, the same year as the university. Since then it has been transferred several times until 1978 when it was finally settled at its present position. Inside the university Sports Centre there is a football field, basketball and tennis courts, handball courts and many more facilities for dancing, weight lifting, ping pong and so on. The National and Poseidonion swimming pools are used for water sports such as swimming, water polo, water aerobics, and synchronized swimming.

The students participating in the sports programs of the centre can take part in the internal championships organized by the Sports Centre or in the inter-university national championships organized by the Sports Committee of the Higher Education in Greece. The A.U.Th. has always participated in these national championships with great success.

=== Residence halls ===
Aristotle University of Thessaloniki owns three branches of residence halls for AUTh students with a capacity of 1,740 students; they are administered by the National Youth Foundation. They include reading rooms, sport facilities, restaurants, café etc. Two branches are in the city centre, one in "40 Ekklisies" near the campus and one in the former "Egnatia" Hotel in Vardaris. The third branch is located in Kalamaria.

The residence halls are reserved for students with special needs, such as members of low-income or large families, as well as some foreign students.

=== Seismological Station ===
The Aristotle University Seismological Station was founded in 1978 and is used since then for the detection and measurement of earthquakes that occur nationwide and worldwide. It is mainly used by researchers of the geophysics sector, which is a part of the Department of Geology of A.U.Th.

The Station's main goal is to monitor Greece's seismic activity, record and analyze the earthquakes that occur in a 24-hour time radius, and announce quickly to the public if necessary. Greece has a lot of seismic activity because they are in the middle of 2-3 plate tectonics. The staff at the station are composed of professors and scientists with a great deal of experience concerning seismological matters.

One of the station's primary roles is to conduct tours for the public and familiarize it with the earthquake phenomenon and how it can be dealt with. This helps to achieve better protection of the public against earthquakes.

Finally, the seismological station promotes collaboration on issues of seismological interest with a lot of other Greek and European institutions. It is also a source of information for international seismological centres concerning the seismic activity of the Mediterranean region, but also of the entire world.

=== Farm and Forest Reserves ===
The University Farm covers an area of 1.9 square kilometres and is located in the south side of Thessaloniki near the city airport. It was ceded to the Aristotle University by the Greek Ministry of Agriculture in order to cover the research and educational needs of the School of Agriculture.

Inside the farm there are 21 buildings, two of which are used throughout the whole year as convention centres where conferences, events, presentations and lectures take place. The rest 19 buildings house laboratories of the School of Agriculture, where research and educational activities take place. Furthermore, the farm is used by staff and students of the School of Agriculture in order to grow experimental crops, breed animals and conduct laboratory excises.

The farm is managed by a Board of Directors, which consists of three professors, one laboratory director, and one representative of the people working at the farm. It is elected every two years and its president is the president of the School of Agriculture.

The University Forest Reserves cover a total area of 88 square kilometres. The first one is located on the Pindus mountain range at an altitude of 1,100 to 1,200 metres and covers approximately 33 square kilometres. The second one is located in Chalkidiki at an altitude of 300 to 1,200 metres and covers approximately 55 square kilometres. Both of these university forests are used by the Faculty of Forestry and Natural Environment in order to conduct research and student training. Inside the forests there are special buildings where staff and students can stay overnight.

=== Camping facilities ===
Established in 1960, the University Camp is located along the coast Poseidi, Chalkidiki, set within a pine forest. It operates annually during the summer months for students and staff of Artistotle University fo Thessaloniki (A.U.Th.). Facilities include a restaurant, grocery store, bar, basketball, and beach volleyball courts, alongside additional sports and recreational amenities.

=== School of Modern Greek Language ===
The School of Modern Greek Language functions under the supervision of the Department of Philosophy since 1970. It offers courses of Modern Greek Language and Greek Culture to foreign students who wish to learn the Greek language and/or intend to study in a Greek University. The main objective of the school is to familiarize its students with the Greek culture, tradition, and customs.

=== Institute of Modern Greek Studies ===
The Institute of Modern Greek Studies was established in 1959 with the support of Manolis Triantafyllidis' bursary. The institute is housed in the building of the Faculty of Philosophy and is practically a branch of it. Its main mission is the advance of science and the promotion of Greek education and philology. This mission is accomplished mainly through the publication of books concerning Greek language, philology and literature. A board of directors comprising seven members manages the institute. Six of them are professors from the Faculty of Philosophy and one from the Faculty of Law.

=== Centre for Byzantine Research ===
The Centre for Byzantine Research was established in 1966 by a group of professors of AUTh. Its main aim is to study Byzantine history, law, art and culture, as well as the training of graduates and specialized researchers in Byzantine studies. The Centre coordinates a variety of research programs and collaborates with many other foreign and domestic institutions. Furthermore, it frequently organizes scientific meetings and conferences and it also publishes a special periodical called "ΒΥΖΑΝΤΙΝΑ". The Centre for Byzantine Research is managed by a five-member administrative council.

The building of the Education Faculty

== Student services ==
=== Career Services Office ===
The Career Services Office of the Aristotle University of Thessaloniki was established in 1997 and its main objective is to help students and graduates take decisions concerning their future studies and career. It provides support and information about a variety of subjects including: undergraduate and postgraduate studies in Greek or foreign universities, available scholarships, student mobility programs (IAESTE, SOCRATES etc.), labor market in Greece and abroad, job vacancies and many more. There is also a group of specially trained personnel, which provides advice and guidance to students and graduates on decision making, CV compilation, job interviews and job application.

The Career Services Office organizes regularly career seminars inviting professionals from different scientific fields to lecture about their jobs and the status of the job market. These career seminars appear to be very helpful because they give students and graduates a chance to get in contact with people of different professions and acquire information about their experiences and accomplishments.

=== Information Technology Centre ===
The Information Technology Centre of the Aristotle University of Thessaloniki was established in the beginning of 1998 under the financial support of the Greek Ministry of Education and the European Union. Its mission is to provide the academic community of the university with a variety of computer facilities, such as client–server applications, host-based applications, High Performance Computing and many more. It also provides technical support via email, phone or fax to all AUTH members and takes care of central backup issues, site licensing matters, maintenance contracts, etc. ITC regularly organizes seminars on topics of computer science, popular software packages and the usage of the university infrastructure. Some of the services provided by ITC to AUTH members are listed below:

- Technical support and consultation services on IT issues
- Educational seminars
- Distribution of public domain software
- Maintenance and support of AUTH Computer Labs
- Central multi-platform backups

Students of the university who have special knowledge and experience on IT can apply to ITC and work part-time.

==== Network Operations Centre ====
The Network Operations Centre is responsible for managing the data network of the Aristotle University of Thessaloniki. It was established in 1995 under the supervision of the Data Network Committee of the university. NOC's main objective is to provide quality network services to the academic community of the Aristotle University of Thessaloniki. Among many services, NOC also provides the following:

- Internet connectivity to all AUTH members (students and staff)
- Basic network services (email, web hosting, digital certificates, Dial up)
- Advanced network services (VoIP, video conference, wireless networking, VPN, Proxy)
- Technical assistance

NOC's staff consists mainly of network specialists, undergraduate students working part-time as network technicians and undergraduate students as trainees. It is mainly funded by the Greek state and the European Union, as it participates in a variety of European Union programs.

=== Student social support ===
The students of AUTH are supported by two independent institutions: The Social Policy Committee and the Student Counseling and Guidance Service.

The Social Policy Committee aims at solving a variety of problems the students may face and thus improve academic life on campus. It was established by the University Rector's Council in September 1997 and since then it has offered its services to a great number of students. These services are briefly listed below:

- Supports students with special needs
- Provides information concerning health care issues
- Offers counseling and psychological support
- Organizes numerous activities and events related to its objectives.

The Student Counseling and Guidance Service provides mainly psychological support and counseling to students on a variety of issues including social and academic life, family problems, adjustment difficulties, emotional problems etc. It also organizes seminars and on a regular basis that deal with stress handling, exam preparation, study time organization and many more. With the help of the Student Counseling and Guidance Service students can more easily adapt to student life and surpass any problems or difficulties. All these services are provided to students free of charge.

=== Health care services ===
All students of Aristotle University of Thessaloniki (Greek or foreign, undergraduate or postgraduate) are provided with health insurance which covers free medical care. This means that hospitalization and medication are provided free of charge. The insurance is valid for the entire period of studies, as long as it doesn't last more than one and a half times its normal duration. Every student who wants to receive free medical care must possess his personal health insurance booklet which is issued and renewed every year by the secretary of the department he/she studies in. Among others, health insurance provides: medical examination, dental examination, physiotherapy, etc.

=== Student unions ===
Every department of the university has a corresponding student union, and all students belonging to the department have the right to register as members. The main objective of a student union is to solve students' problems that can either be related to academic life or have a general political and social nature. Furthermore, student unions organize and support numerous activities such as political debates, educational lectures, cultural and artistic events, conferences, demonstrations, university occupations and so on.

The structure of a student union is rather simple and comprises two bodies: The general assembly and the board of directors. The General Assembly consists of all student-members of the union. It takes place on a regular basis and is the only decision-making body. During the general assembly, many topics of student interest are discussed and the decisions are taken after open vote. The board of directors makes sure that the decisions of the general assembly will be materialized. Moreover, the members of the board of directors, among which is the union's president, participate in various university administrative bodies as representatives of all students in the union.

Every year in early spring the student elections take place nationwide, during which students vote for their representatives.

All student unions in Greece are members of the "National Student Union of Greece" (ΕΦΕΕ – Εθνική Φοιτητική Ένωση Ελλάδας). Moreover, all Student Unions of the Aristotle University of Thessaloniki form the "Aristotle University of Thessaloniki Student Union" (ΦΕΑΠΘ – Φοιτητική Ένωση Αριστοτελείου Πανεπιστημίου Θεσσαλονίκης). Both unions, ΕΦΕΕ and ΦΕΑΠΘ, are inactive since 1995.

== Art and culture ==
=== Orchestra ===
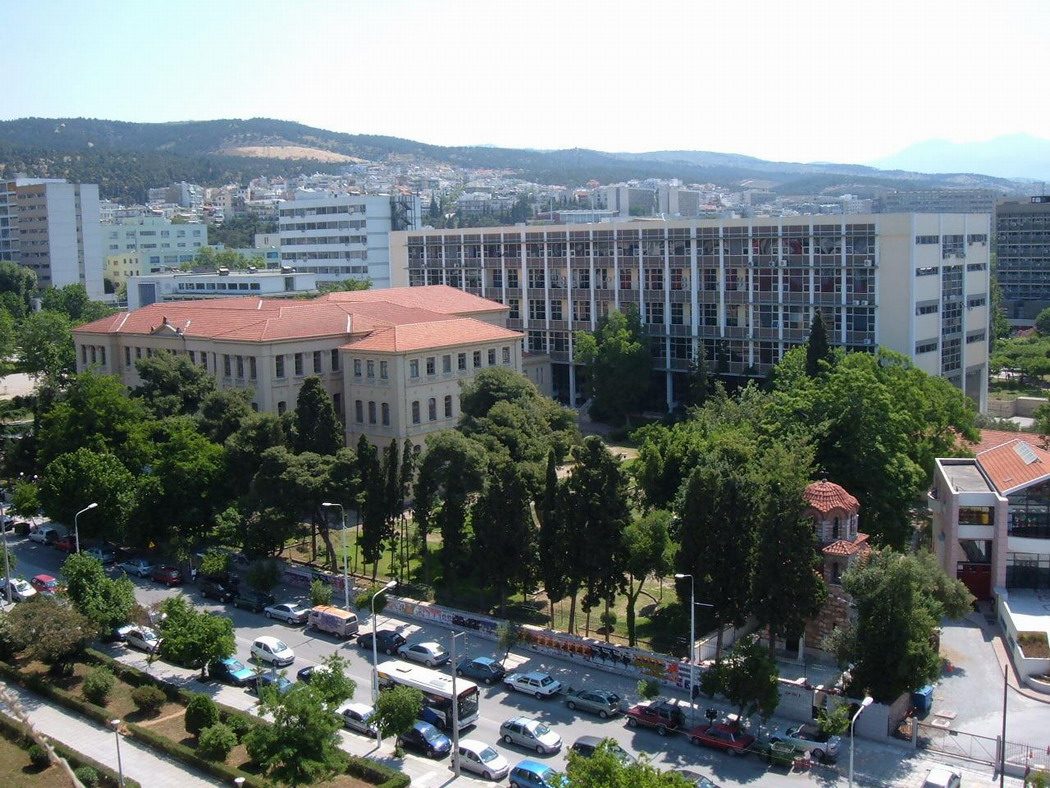
A view of the university

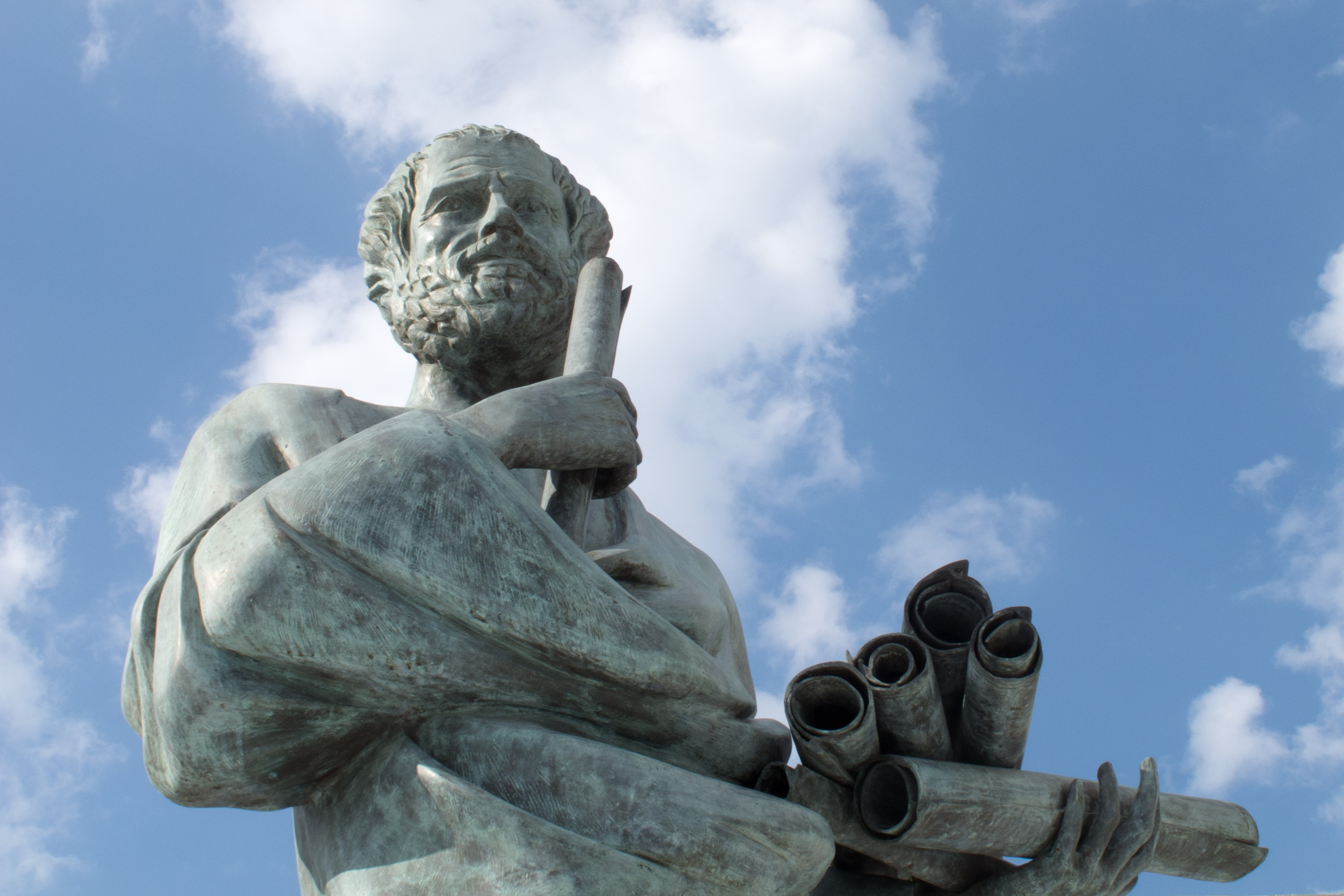
A statue of Aristotle in the campus

The A.U.Th. Orchestra was established in February 1999 and since then it has participated in a lot of concerts held all over Greece. Since its establishment the interest of the students in it has rapidly increased. The orchestra gives regular concerts for the public of Thessaloniki during the national holidays (25 March, 26 October, etc.) and participates in international festivals and events.

=== Chorus ===
The official name of the Aristotle University Chorus is "J. Mandakas Chorus", named after its founder, John Mandakas, who created it in 1953. Nowadays the chorus plays a very important role in the musical and cultural life of the city of Thessaloniki and Greece generally. It also has a constant presence in musical events held all over the world, gaining not only national but also international recognition. For more than 50 years, the A.U.Th. Chorus has given the opportunity to more than 4000 students and other members of the academic community to cultivate their musical talent and to develop strong bonds of friendship and collaboration.

The chorus participates regularly in concerts held during national holidays, various events and festivals (Dimetria, Athens Festival etc.). It also organizes and participates in a lot of meetings of Greek and foreign choruses and orchestras. Finally it has published numerous CDs and DVDs and made a lot of recordings for the Greek national television and radio.

The chorus has contributed decisively in the development of choral music in Greece and in the familiarization of the Greek public with it through the presentation of hundreds of musical works. Furthermore, it has presented many Greek compositions for the first time to the public, helping the Greek composers to achieve international recognition for their compositions.

Since 1964, the Aristotle University Chorus is a member of the Europa Cantat - European Federation of Young Choirs, nowadays the European Choral Association. The rehearsals take place inside the Student club with the participation of the university Orchestra.

=== Student Week ===
The Student Week is a cultural event organized annually inside the university campus. It actually lasts for three or four weeks and is organized by more than 60 student groups, whose interests include dance, music, theater, cinema, sports, poetry, comics, etc. This event is open not only to all the members of the academic community of A.U.Th., but also to all the citizens of Thessaloniki.

Its main objective is to promote students' talents in art and culture and to encourage the free artistic expression of the students as individuals or as a group. It also aims at strengthening the human relations between the students and the personnel of the university. The interest of the students in the Student Week has been rapidly increasing since its establishment in 1999.

=== Teloglion Fine Arts Foundation ===
The Teloglion Fine Arts Foundation was founded in 1972 with the donation of the entire fortune, along with a very rich art collection, of Nestor and Aliki Teloglou to the Aristotle University of Thessaloniki. This art collection is now exhibited in a separate building located in the northern side of the university campus. The foundation is a non-profit organization supervised by the Aristotle University and directed by a board of Trustees composed mainly of university professors.

The art collection included mainly works of Greek artists during the 19th and 20th century and has now been enriched thanks to further donations made by famous persons and artists. At present, the collection includes works from various ancient civilizations, such as statuettes and pottery from the Hellenistic period, Corinthian and Roman pottery, Persian miniatures, Islamic and Chinese vases and dishes, etc. It also includes pieces from modern artists such as the monumental work of art "The World of Cyprus" by Diamandis.

The foundation's mission is to support all art related studies and research and help the public familiarize itself with art and culture. This is achieved through the organization of numerous conferences, seminars and exhibitions of the museum's artworks.

=== Student cultural groups ===
There is a variety of student cultural groups that deal with Drama, Fine Arts, Music, Cinema, Chess, Debate, Comics etc. The cultural groups frequently organize events in which the work of the participants is presented to the public. These events can be theatrical plays, music concerts, debates, chess competitions, art exhibitions and many more. Every student can participate in any cultural group he/she likes and express his talent through art.

== Security issues ==
In February 2026, police detained 313 people involved in a raid on the Aristotle University campus after they attacked a group of riot police. People attending an annual party at the School of Mechanical Engineering threw over 100 Molotov cocktails. All the people detained were released without charges being laid. While clashes near the Aristotle University campus are not uncommon, police officials noted that this incident involved an 'unusually high number of firebombs'. The Ministry of Education, Religious Affairs and Sports requested that university authorities provide an explanation with 48 hours. The incident has sparked a debate over campus security, the role of university authorities, and the need for stricter access controls.

== Participation in international organizations ==
The Aristotle University of Thessaloniki participates in the following International Organizations, Unions and University Networks:

- Balkan Universities Network
- IAU – International Association of Universities
- EUA – European Universities Association
- TIME – Top Industrial Managers in Engineering
- EAIE – European Association for International Education
- ESMU – European Centre for Strategic Management of Universities
- CMU – Community of Mediterranean Universities
- EUPRIO – European Universities Information & Relations Office
- Utrecht Network
- European Language Council
- EAN – European Access Network
- World Association for the History of Veterinary Medicine
- TII – Technology Innovation Information
- ERA-MORE – European Network of Mobility Centres
- C.I.P.A. – International Committee on Monument Documentation
- A.D.E.E. – Association for Dental Education in Europe
- Network on European Education in Geodetic Engineering, Cartography and Surveying (EEGECS)
- CESAER – Conference of European Schools for advanced Engineering, Education and Research
- SEFI – Societe Europeene pour la Formation des Ingenieurs (European Society for Engineering Education)
- HumanitarianNet – Thematic Network on Humanitarian Development Studies
- E.C.P.R. – ESU European Consortium for Political Research- European Summer University
- ELIA – European League of Institutes of the Arts

Student Unions

- IMSoG - International Medical Students of Greece
- ACM - Association for Computing Machinery
- AIESEC – Association Internationale des Etudiants en Sciences Economiques et Commerciales
- IEEE - Institute of Electrical and Electronics Engineers
- IAESTE – International Education for the Exchange of Students for Technical Experience
- B.E.S.T. – Board of European Students of Technology

== Honorary doctorates ==
AUTH Honorary doctorates
- Johann Georg Goldammer, GFMC, Max Planck Institute for Chemistry
- Patriarch Bartholomew I of Constantinople
- Santiago Calatrava, Spanish architect and structural engineer.
- Odysseas Elytis, Greek poet, Nobel laureate (Literature).
- Manolis Glezos
- Robert J. Gorlin
- Clive Granger, Nobel laureate (Economics).
- Eric Hobsbawm, historian
- Richard L. Hunter, Regius Professor of Greek (Cambridge)
- Iakovos, Archbishop of America, School of Pastoral Theology.
- Harry Markowitz, Nobel laureate (Economics).
- Yiannis Ritsos, Greek poet
- Iakovos Kambanelis
- Neoklis Sarris, Greek academic and politician.
- Xenophon Zolotas, Greek economist, former Prime Minister of Greece.
- Roberto Benigni, School of Italian Language and Literature.
- Costa-Gavras, School of Film Studies
- Constantine A. Balanis, Regents' Professor, Electrical Engineering, Arizona State University
- Nikos Kyrpides, Joint Genome Institute
- Stephen Harrison, Professor of Latin Literature, Senior Research Fellow, Corpus Christi College, University of Oxford

== Notable professors ==
- Manolis Andronikos, archaeologist and professor at the Aristotle University of Thessaloniki. Manolis Andronikos made one of the most important archaeological discoveries of the 20th century: he discovered the tomb of Philip II of Macedon at Vergina in the prefecture of Imathia, Greece. The tomb was unopened and contained many invaluable items, such as the Golden Larnax.
- Athanasios Angelopoulos, academic, professor of Pastoral Theology
- Kostas Chrysogonos, jurist
- George Hourmouziadis, Professor Emeritus of prehistoric archaeology
- Patroklos Karantinos, architect
- Emmanuel Kriaras, lexicographer and philologist
- Ioannis Kakridis, philologist
- Dimitrios Pandermalis, professor of archaeology, curator of the new Acropolis Museum
- Nicholas Papapolitis, also a politician and member of the legal team that drafted Greece's new constitution in 1974
- Victoria Samanidou, analytical chemist and Aristotle University professor
- Alexander Savvas, professor of medicine
- John Hugh Seiradakis, Professor Emeritus of astronomy
- Vassilios Skouris, 10th president of the European Court of Justice
- Manolis Triantafyllidis, philologist, major representative of the demotic movement in education in Greece
- Dimitris Tsatsos, jurist
- Ioannis Theodorakopoulos, philosophy
- Evangelos Venizelos, minister of finance and a member of the Hellenic Parliament for the Panhellenic Socialist Movement. He is a professor of constitutional law at the Law School
- Apostolos Vacalopoulos, historian
- Christos Yannaras, philosopher and theologian
- Rena Sakellaridou, Professor of Architectural Design, architect and author

== Notable alumni ==
- Vassilis Angelopoulos, head of NASA's Themis project, 2010.
- Gianna Angelopoulos-Daskalaki, business woman, named as one of the 50 most powerful women by Forbes magazine. She was the president of the Organizing Committee for the 2004 Summer Olympics in Athens. She studied law at the Aristotle University of Thessaloniki.
- Phaedon Avouris, IBM Fellow and the manager for Nanometre Scale Science and Technology at the Thomas J. Watson Research Center in Yorktown Heights, New York. He has received the APS Irving Langmuir Prize for Chemical Physics (2003), the AVS Medard W. Welch Award for Surface Science (1997), the Julius Springer Prize for Applied Physics (2008) and the Richard Feynman Prize (1999).
- Xavier Bettel, prime minister of Luxembourg. He studied maritime law and ecclesiastical law through the Erasmus Programme.
- Albert Bourla, CEO of Pfizer
- Christos Christou, International president of Médecins Sans Frontières
- Anna Fafaliou, conceptual artist
- Constantin Floros, musicologist
- Dimitris P. Kraniotis, poet with translated works in 25 languages, after qualifying as a medical doctor.
- Andreas Loverdos, lawyer
- Orestes Manousos, gastroenterologist and Professor of Medicine, University of Crete
- Ioannis Melissanidis, athlete, 1996 Olympics in Atlanta gold winner on the floor exercise
- Thanassis Papakonstantinou, musician
- Christos Sartzetakis, jurist and statesman. He entered the Law Faculty in 1946, received his degree in 1950, and then practiced law in Thessaloniki. He was the prosecutor in the case of the assassination of the left-wing member of parliament Grigoris Lambrakis. On 9 March 1985 he was elected by the Greek Parliament as President of the Hellenic Republic for one 5-year term, succeeding Konstantinos Karamanlis.
- Dimitra Simeonidou, professor of high performance networks
- Nektarios Tavernarakis, Professor at the Medical School of the University of Crete, Director of the Institute of Molecular Biology and Biotechnology, at the Foundation for Research and Technology, in Heraklion, Crete. Member of the Academy of Europe & EMBO.
- Vassilis Vassilikos, writer and diplomat.
- Yiorgos Veltsos, writer and philosopher.
- Nikolaos P. Xionis, Professor of Systematic Theology in the Faculty of Theology of the National and Kapodistrian University of Athens.
- Zissis Samaras, Professor of Thermodynamics in the Faculty of Mechanical Engineering of the Aristotle University of Thessaloniki.
- Euterpi Koutzamani, first woman Prosecutor General of Greece
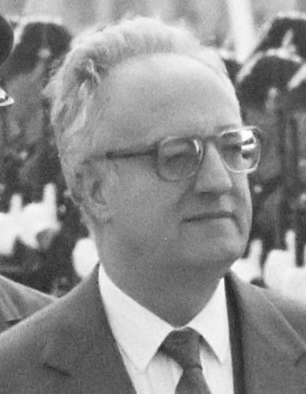
Christos Sartzetakis, President of the Hellenic Republic.

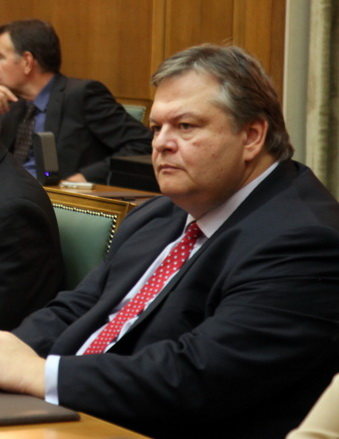
Evangelos Venizelos, leader of PASOK.

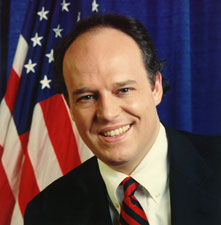
Peter Fitzgerald, a U.S. Senator from Illinois (1999–2005).

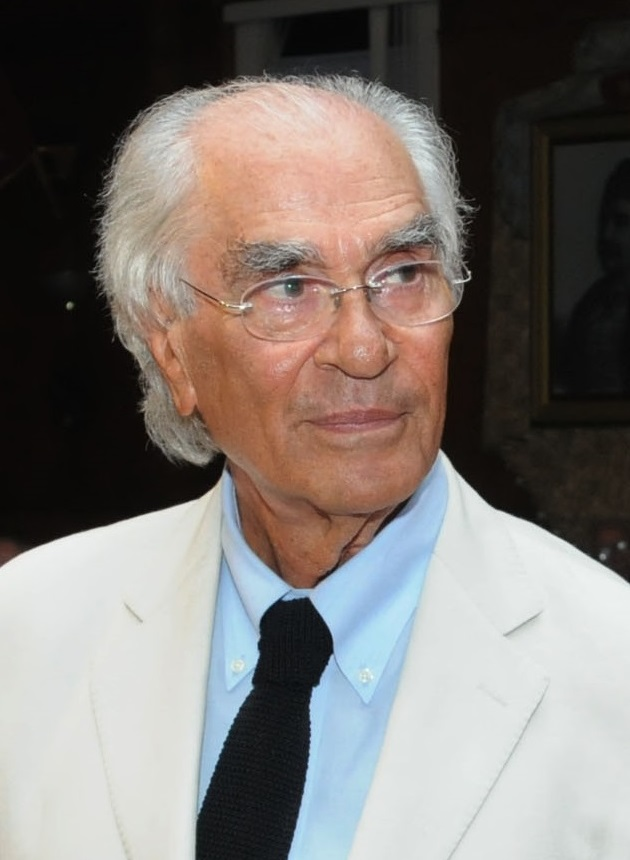
Christos Yannaras, theologian and philosopher.

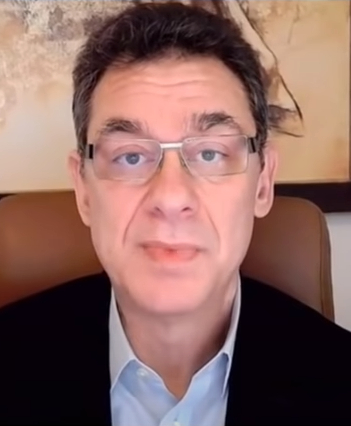
Albert Bourla, CEO of Pfizer.

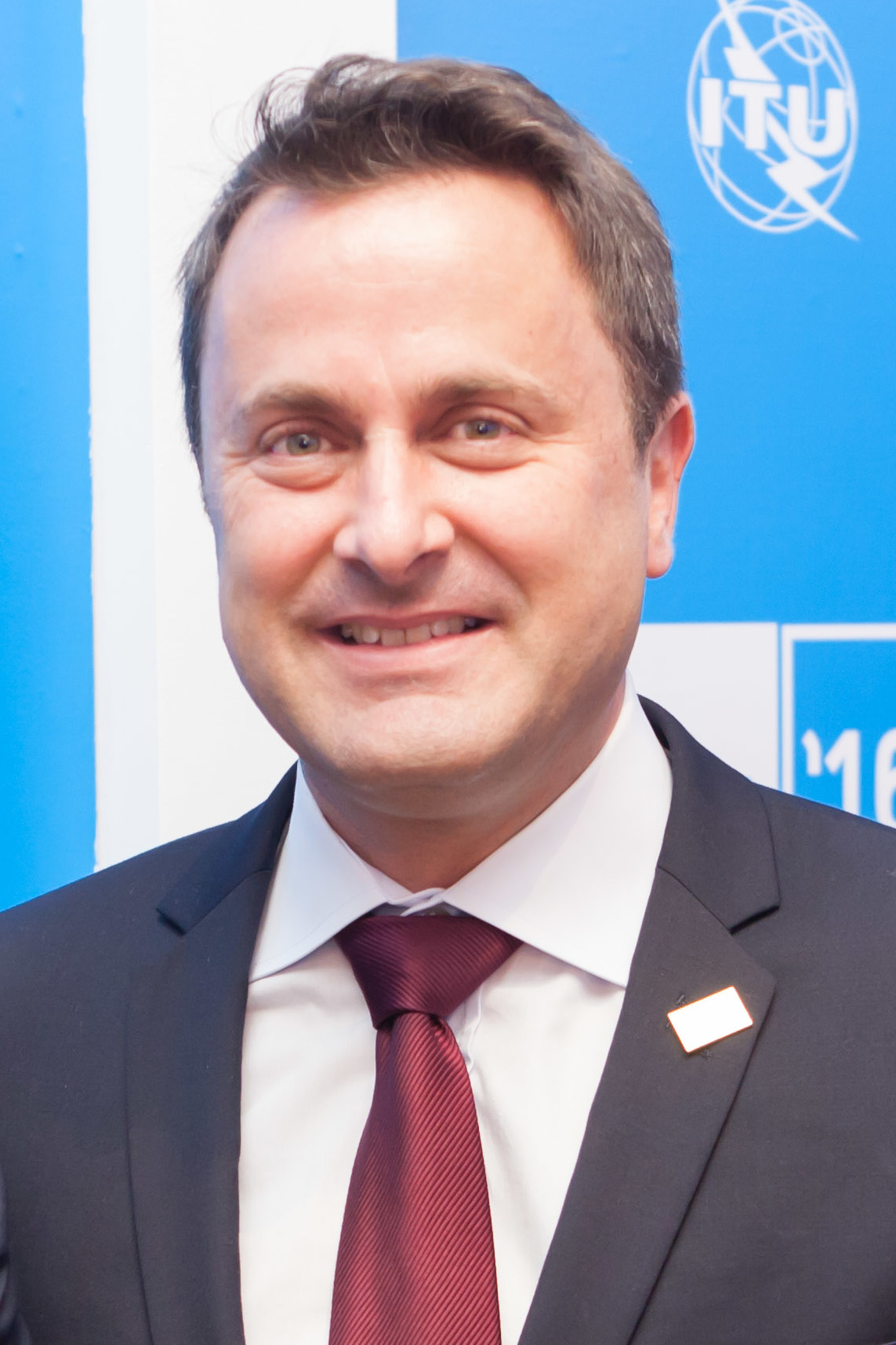
Xavier Bettel, Prime Minister of Luxembourg.

== See also ==
- AHEPA University Hospital
- List of modern universities in Europe (1801–1945)
- List of universities in Greece
- Museum of Plaster Casts (Thessaloniki)
- Open access in Greece
- University of Macedonia, the other major university of Thessaloniki
- URENIO
