= Zissis Samaras =

Greek mechanical engineer and academic (born 1956)

- Born: 22 February 1956 (age 70); Thessaloniki, Central Macedonia, Greece
- Scientific career
- Fields: Thermodynamics, Vehicle emissions control, Vehicle emission standard
- Workplaces: Aristotle University of Thessaloniki
- Doctoral advisor: Konstantinos Pattas

Zissis Samaras (born 22 February 1956) is a Greek mechanical engineer and a professor of thermodynamics at Aristotle University of Thessaloniki, where he began his academic career in 1989.

He is also the head of the Laboratory of Applied Thermodynamics (LAT) and co-founder of the two environmental spinoffs EMISIA SA and Exothermia.

== Career ==
Zissis Samaras was born in Thessaloniki in 1956 and completed his PhD at Aristotle University of Thessaloniki in 1989. He later became a lecturer in Thermodynamics at the same institution. In 2003, he was appointed to a professorship and later head of department from 2007 to 2009.

His research work deals primarily with engine and vehicle emissions testing and modeling, and he has carried out a wide range of projects on modeling emissions from internal combustion engines. In recent years, he has more broadly focused on sustainable energy and experimental techniques for testing of exhaust emissions.

In the past two decades he has led multiple research projects with LAT, involving the European Commission. Moreover, the Greek state has made use of technology developed by the Laboratory of Applied Thermodynamics and Zissis Samaras.

He is the Vice Chair of European Road Transport Research Advisory Council. Since 2021, he has been the co-ordinator of European Commission's fuel consumption project Mile21.

== Education ==
He received his BSc/MSc and PhD degrees in mechanical engineering from Aristotle University of Thessaloniki.

== Published work ==
Samaras has authored and co-authored more than 300 scientific publications to date.
