= Papapolitis =

Papapolitis may refer to:

- Nicholas Papapolitis
- Savas Papapolitis
