= Anna Fafaliou =

Greek conceptual artist

- Born: 1987 (age 38–39); Athens, Greece
- Known for: Sculpture, Performance, Painting, Installation
- Website: annafafaliou.com

Anna Fafaliou (Άννα Φαφαλιού) (born 1987) is a conceptual artist currently working between London and Los Angeles.

== Early life ==
Born in Athens, Greece, she left her hometown at the age of 17 to study at the School of Fine Arts, Aristotle University of Thessaloniki. In 2011 she moved to London where she was introduced to the British Art Scene. She holds a MA in Film and Visual Arts from Birkbeck College, University of London (2012). She started working at artists' studios both as an assistant and technician, and in late 2014 she began her own practice from her studio in London.

== Work ==
Originally trained as a performance artist, Fafaliou's recent work explores the relationship between object, memory and identity. Her practice is based on the distortion of commonplace objects, materials, and forms in order to create new dialogues between them and the viewer, observing the disruption of familiarity to them.

Anna Fafaliou creates imaginary environments that question the visual and physical ways of experiencing materiality and how we perceive, process and record our immediate environment. "My work focuses on the fluidity and instability of our visual perception and memory in relation to the physical presence, and how spatial relationships can be disrupted and are open to interpretation. Inspired by the notion of memory, identity and visual perception I create installations and performances exploring the relationship between object, memory and space".

Fafaliou's work has been shown in galleries, fairs and festivals among other places in Venice, London, New York, San Francisco, Athens and Bangkok.
