= Victoria Samanidou =

Greek analytical chemist and academic

Victoria F. Samanidou
- Citizenship: Greece
- Website: users.auth.gr/samanidu/

Victoria F. Samanidou is a Greek analytical chemist. She is a professor at Aristotle University of Thessaloniki in Thessaloniki, Greece.

== Achievements and honours ==
- 2023 the Power List - Mentors and Educators, Analytical Scientist
