= Casts Museum (Thessaloniki) =

Archaeological museum in Thessaloniki, Greece

Coordinates: 40.6314°N 22.9553°E

The Casts Museum occupies two rooms in the basement of the new building of the School of Philosophy of the Aristotle University of Thessaloniki, in Central Macedonia, Greece. The museum houses a collection of plaster casts, replicas and original archaeological artifacts. The collection dates from the time of the University's founding and is due to K. Romaio, Professor of Classical Archaeology.

The collection of plaster casts of marble and clay originals and replicas of works of art in metal is the finest in Greece. It brings Archaeological Department students into contact with the ancient Greek and Roman art of statue production, as well as ceramics and small-scale art.

Room A holds replicas of works from archaic and classical times. Room B exhibits works from Hellenistic and Roman times. Among the most notable works are copies of the Parthenon Frieze, votive reliefs and funerary pillars, statues (youths and maidens), plaques from Athena Nikis armour, coins, decorative corner roof tiles, funeral urns and masks.

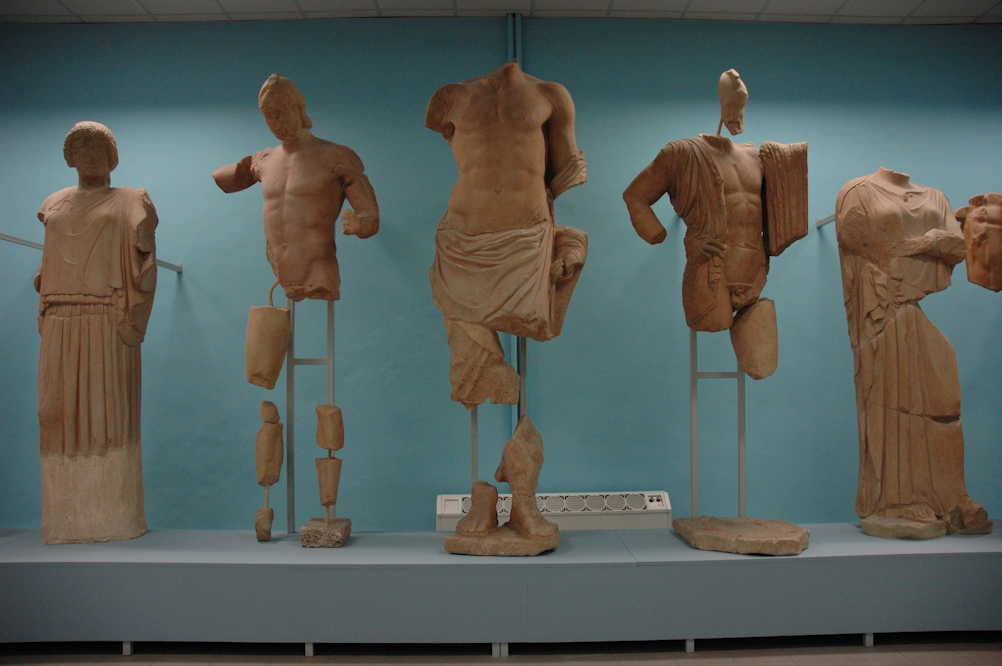

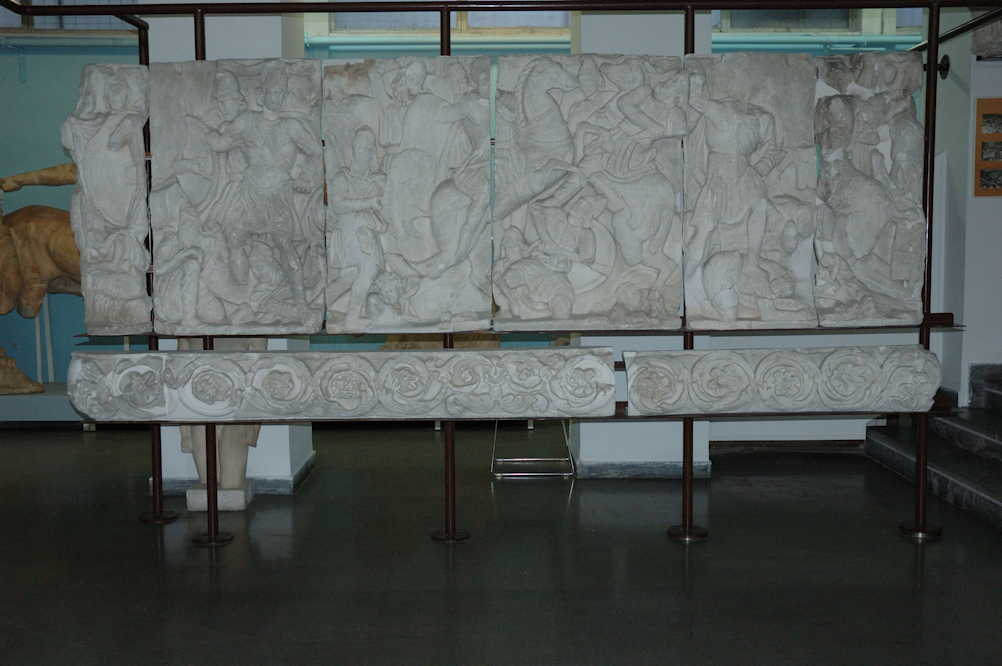

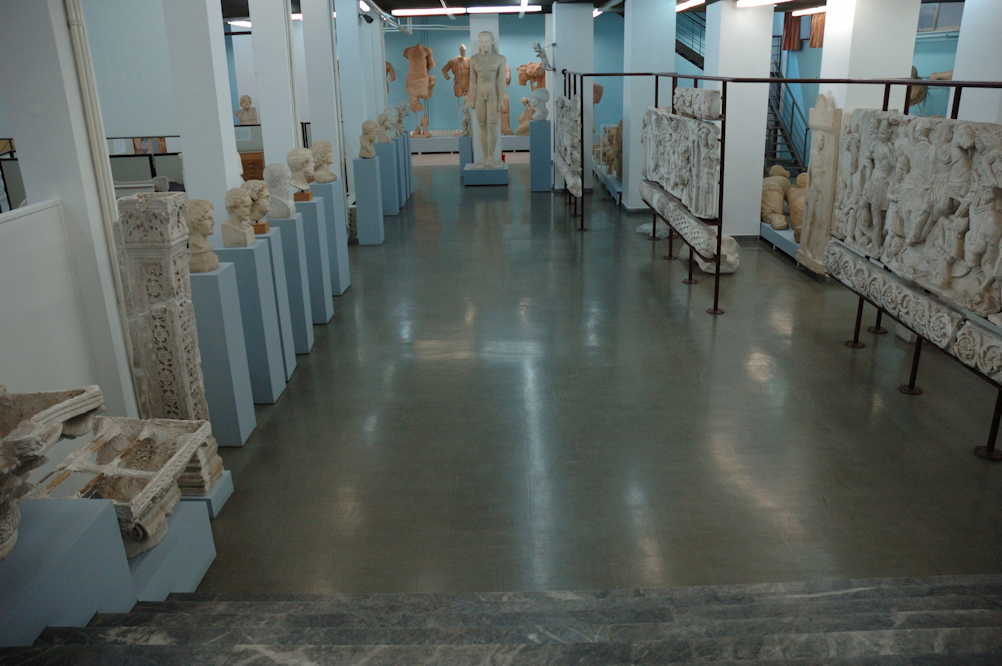

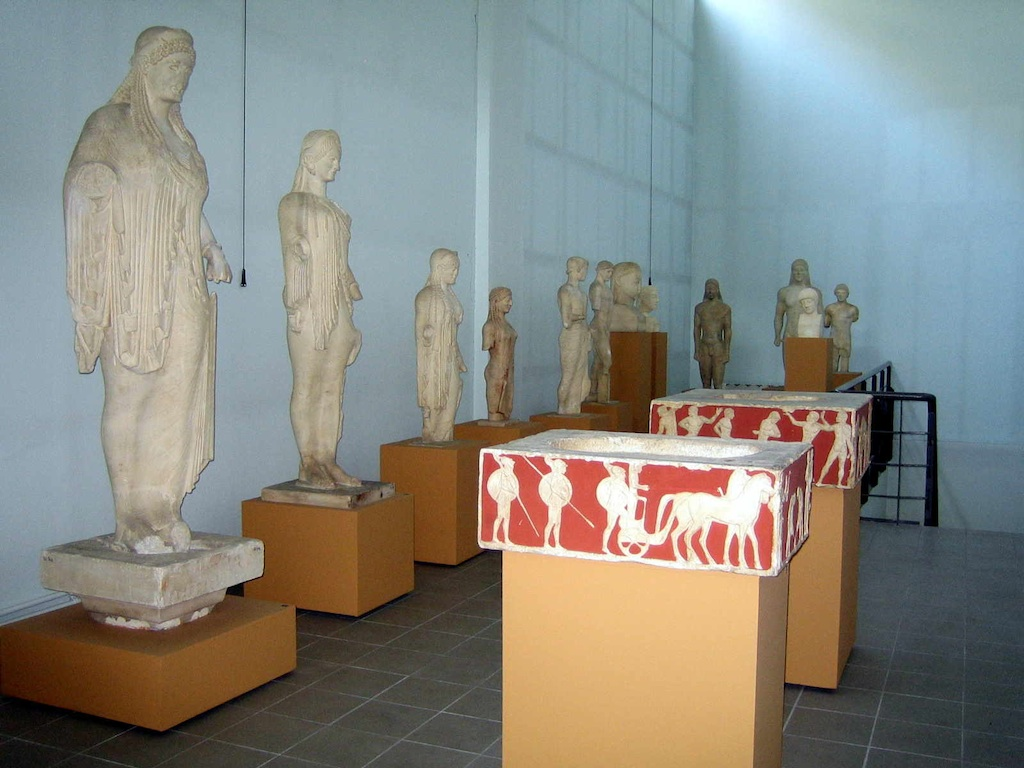

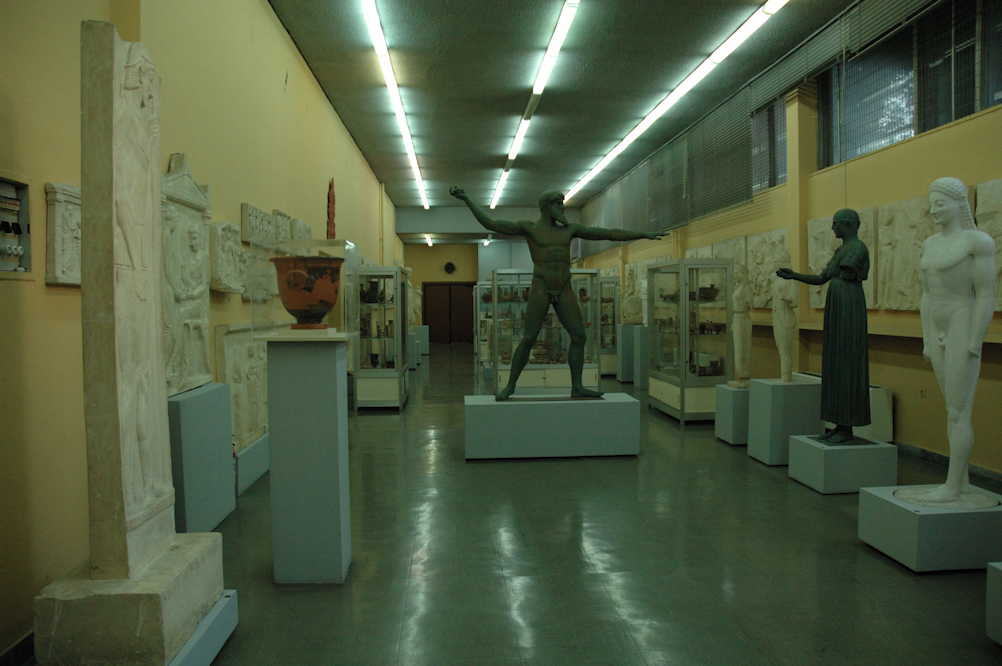

== Sources ==
- This article incorporates text from the corresponding article at the Museums of Macedonia website, commissioned by the Macedonian Heritage foundation, written by Vlasis Vlasidis, and published under a CC-BY-SA-3.0 license.
