= Orestes Manousos =

Greek gastroenterologist (1931–2021)

- Ορέστης Μανούσος
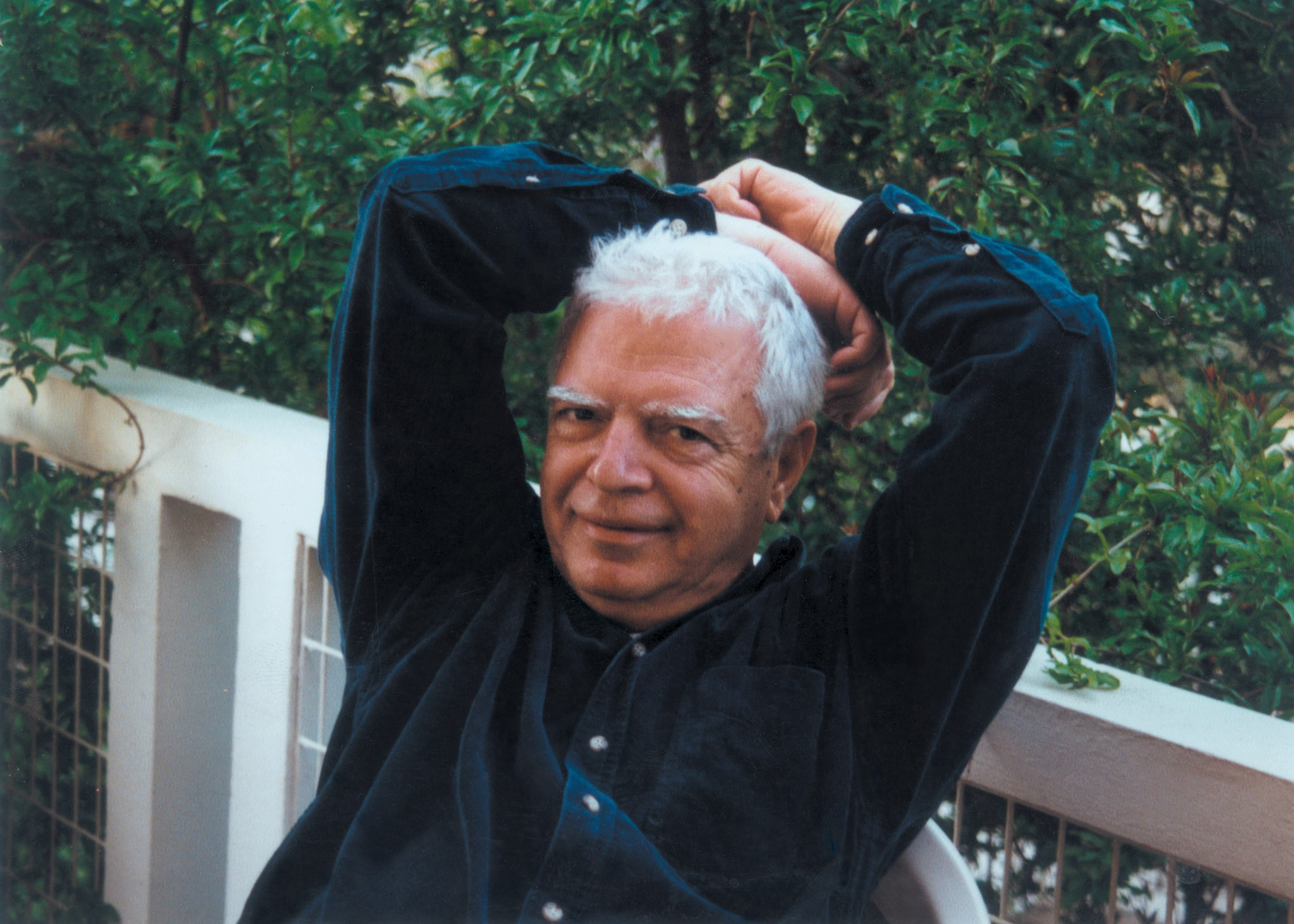
- Orestes Manousos at his home in Cholargos, Greece. ca 2000
- Born: 15 May 1931; Anogeia, Mylopotamos, Crete.
- Died: 21 June 2021 (aged 90); Cholargos, Athens, Greece.
- Spouse: Mary Papastefanakis
- Children: Nikos, Margaret, Manolis, Renata, Dafni.
- Scientific career
- Fields: Medical Doctor, Professor of Medical School UOC.
- Thesis: Diverticulosis of the colon (1964)
- Academic advisors: Sidney Truelove, Sir Francis Avery Jones, Leslie Witts, John Lennard-Jones, Georgios Merikas, Cushman Haagensen.

Orestes Manousos (Greek: Ορέστης Μανούσος, 15 May 1931 – 21 June 2021) was a Greek gastroenterologist and Professor of Medicine at the University of Crete. He was Director of the First Gastroenterology Clinic of the Evangelismos Hospital (1977–1985), President of the Hellenic Society of Gastroenterology (1981–1982), founding member and first President of the Mediterranean Medical Society (1989), founding member and first President of the Hellenic Society for the Study of Helicobacter Pylori (1996).

Orestes Manousos published a large number of clinical and research papers on digestive diseases in international medical journals. He also wrote three medical textbooks, Introduction to Clinical Medicine with Professor Theodoros Mountokalakis, The Immunology of Enteropathies with Professor Ioanna Economidou, and Colitis and... "Colitis", which had a significant impact on the Greek gastroenterological community. After his retirement in 1998, he wrote several books on Cretan history and folklore as well as a historical novel.

== Εarly life and education ==
Orestes Manousos was born in 1931 in the Cretan village of Anogeia. His father was Nikolaos Manousos, a local doctor with significant activity and recognition during World War II, and his mother was Irini Kefalogianni, sister of Kostas Kefalogiannis, a local war hero of the Greek resistance.

Orestes Manousos attended the Heraklion High School and studied medicine at the University of Thessaloniki. In 1959, after completing his military service in the Air Force, he left for England for postgraduate studies in London (Central Middlesex and St Marks Hospitals) and Oxford (Radcliffe Infirmary). He stayed in the UK for the next six years, gaining specialties in internal medicine (1961) and gastroenterology (1965). In 1964 his research into diverticular disease was acknowledged with the degree of Doctor of Philosophy (Ph.D.) from the University of Oxford. His professors were Sidney Truelove, Sir Francis Avery Jones, Leslie Witts, and John Lennard-Jones.

== Career ==
After his return to Greece, he worked initially at Evangelismos Hospital and at the University Clinic of Hippocrateon Private Hospital, under the guidance of Professor George Merikas. In the following years, he became head of the Department of Pathology at the Columbia Clinic of Evangelismos, chaired by Cushman Haagensen, a professor at Columbia University College in New York.

In 1973 he was elected Lecturer of the Faculty of Medicine of the University of Athens and from 1977 to 1985 he was Director of the first Gastroenterology Clinic of Evangelismos Hospital.

His work on immunology of the digestive tract, in collaboration with Professor Ioanna Economidou was important. In particular, their work on α-heavy chain disease and Mediterranean Lymphoma was of global impact.

He organized an important and unique for his era, endoscopic department at the Evangelismos Hospital and played a leading role in the Hellenic Society of Gastroenterology, of which he was president in 1981 and 1982. He was also President of the 8th Panhellenic Congress of Gastroenterology, which was held with great success in Heraklion, Crete.

In 1985 he was elected Professor of Gastroenterology at the Medical School of the University of Crete and during the period 1990–1998, he was Director of the Gastroenterology Clinic of the University Hospital of Heraklion. He was an important pioneer in the first difficult steps of both the Medical University of Crete and the University Hospital of Heraklion. In 2003 he was awarded Professor Emeritus of the Faculty of Medicine of the University of Crete.

== Personal life ==
In his spare time, Orestes Manousos played chess with his friends, read detective novels, took walks at the foothills of Mount Hymettus, and spent time with his family. In 1955, when he was 24 years old, he married Mary Papastefanakis. In the 66 years of their marriage, they had five children and four grandchildren.

In 2015 he was diagnosed with Alzheimer's disease. He died in 2021. In November 2022, in honor of his work and contribution, the University Hospital of Heraklion renamed the hospital's Gastroenterology Clinic to "Orestes Manousos Gastroenterology Clinic".

== Publications ==
=== Medical textbooks ===
- "An Introduction to Clinical Medicine". O.Manousos - Th.Mountokalakis, Litsa Publications, Athens 1978.
- "The Immunology of Enteropathies". I.Economidou - O.Manousos.
- "Colitis and... 'Colitis'". Zeta Medical Publications, Athens 2004

=== Books on Cretan history and folklore ===
- "The Son of Zacharenia". First edition Detorakis, Heraklion 1996, subsequent editions Anubis Publications Athens 2001.
- "The Anogeians of Old". Anubis Publications, Athens 2007.
- 'Eumenia: Life and State of the Cretan Sultana Rebia Gulnous'. Anubis Publications, Athens 2010.
- 'Patrick Leigh Fermor: The Last Hero of England'. Anubis Publications, Athens 2012.
- 'Old man Koundis'. Anubis Publications, Athens 2015.
