= URENIO =

The URBAN AND REGIONAL INNOVATION Research (URENIO) is a university lab in the Department of Urban and Regional Planning, School of Engineering at the Aristotle University of Thessaloniki. URENIO is a non-profit research organization that started its operation in 1995. URENIO is mainly involved in competitive projects from the European R&D Framework Programs (FP), the Competitiveness and Innovation Program (CIP), the territorial cooperation programs, the OECD, and the United Nations.

== Research focus ==
The initial research focus of URENIO concerned the technological development of cities and regions and their ability to create environments supporting R&D, human skills, and innovation. Interest in the contribution of technological innovation to urban and regional development peaked after 1980 by economic geography research on industrial districts of central Italy, new industrial spaces in the west coast of the US, and the planning of large technopoles in Japan. These new forms of agglomeration brought on the surface a series of phenomena with major impact on urban and regional development, such as the geographical concentration of innovation, the role of R&D and innovation in regional competitiveness and growth, the drivers of innovative agglomerations, the new divides and gaps in terms of knowledge and innovation. Since then, technology and innovation have been a standard point of reference in the development and planning of cities and regions.

The current research emphasis is on innovation ecosystems and intelligent cities. Intelligent cities are advanced ecosystems of innovation, combining knowledge-intensive clusters, technology learning institutions, and digital spaces. Intelligent cities constitute a discrete category of intelligent environments created by the agglomeration of creativities, smaller systems of innovation that operate within cities (technology districts, technology parks, innovation poles, innovative clusters), and digital networks and online services.

Their added value lies in the ability to bring together and connect three forms of intelligence: human intelligence of the city's population, collective intelligence of institutions supporting learning and innovation, and artificial intelligence of smart environments, digital networks and online services.

Main fields of URENIO's research are:

- Development and planning of innovative clusters, technology districts, technopoles, science parks, innovation centers, and incubators.
- Regional innovation systems and strategies: Knowledge-based urban and regional development. Management of regional systems of innovation. Regional innovation strategies, RIS and RITTS projects. Measuring and benchmarking of regional innovation performance.
- Intelligent cities: Design and development of digital innovation environments. Intelligent clusters and technology parks. Living Labs. Intelligent city strategies. Applications for collective intelligence, technology transfer, collaborative new product development, and product promotion. Innovation ecosystems, smart cities and future Internet technologies.

== Intelligent city platforms ==
URENIO has developed a series of digital spaces and tools which facilitate the design and development of virtual innovation ecosystems and intelligent cities.

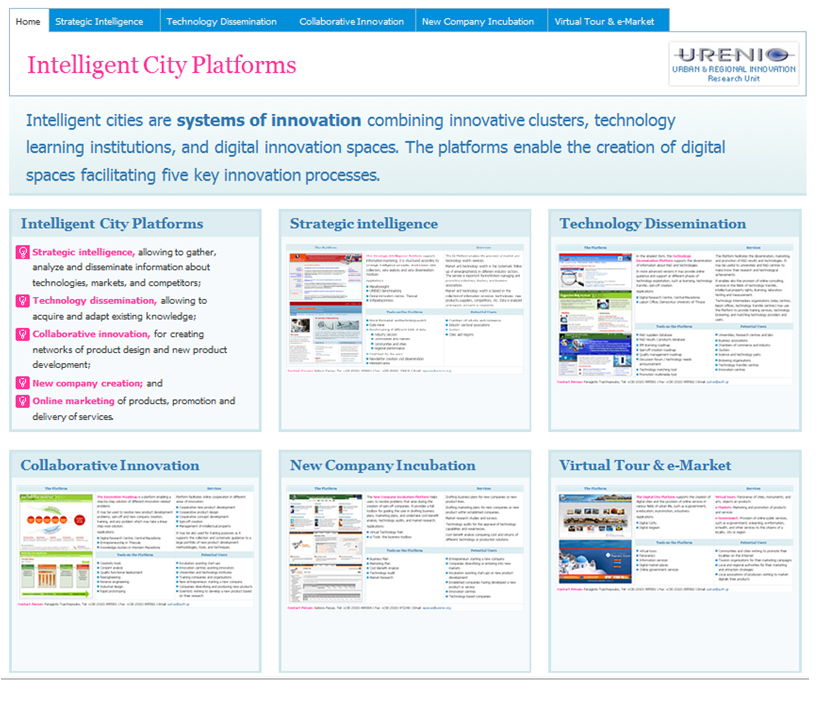

The platforms support key innovation processes:

- Strategic intelligence, allowing to gather and analyze information about technologies, markets, and competitors;
- Technology acquisition and learning, allowing to learn about available technologies and ways to valorise them;
- Collaborative innovation and crowdsourcing for creation of networks of product design and new product development;
- Digital marketplaces and online marketing of products and services, and
- New companies incubation.

== Academic activities ==
Academic activities of URENIO focus on undergraduate and post-graduate teaching on urban development, learning regions, and digital cities. Recent post-graduate activities include:

- The annual post-graduate seminar 'Intelligent cities: Systems and environments of innovation';
- The creation of a series of educational platforms facilitating the design of intelligent cities.

== Accomplishments ==
URENIO is mainly known for its research record in the field of ‘regional innovation’ (TII Innovation Journal); research carried out in the Lab is acknowledged by leading organizations in this field (CORDIS, IMProve; Observatory Pascal); it is among the few academic organizations promoting research in the field of intelligent cities (Intelligent Cities Networks) having introduced the concept of intelligent cities as physico-virtual territorial systems of innovation, and most advanced innovative agglomerations. The website of the Unit is at the 1st position of ALEXA's ranking of top sites in the Urban and Regional Planning Education category(Alexa).

The website of URENIO offers a global watch on research and planning activities related to environments of innovation, user-driven innovation ecosystems, and intelligent cities. News, software, books, papers, reports, and best practices are presented in 18 categories dealing with innovation theory and metrics, innovation ecosystems and clusters, virtual innovation environments, digital, smart, and intelligent cities.
