= AHEPA University Hospital =

Geography
- Location: Thessaloniki, Greece

Organisation
- Care system: Public
- Type: Teaching
- Affiliated university: Aristotle University of Thessaloniki

Services
- Beds: 680

History
- Founded: 1947

The AHEPA University General Hospital (Greek: Πανεπιστημιακό Νοσοκομείο ΑΧΕΠΑ), also known as AHEPA Hospital, is considered one of the biggest hospitals in Greece, based in Thessaloniki. The hospital has 680 beds and all the spectrum of medical and surgical specialities of medicine as well as the psychiatric sector. It is associated with the 4th Health District of Health Services of Macedonia and Thrace as an independent service, with administrative and economic autonomy. The central service of AHEPA hospital is located in the territory of Aristotle University of Thessaloniki, within the administrative region of the municipality of Thessaloniki. It is a major teaching hospital and part of the ESY (Greek: ΕΣΥ - Εθνικό Σύστημα Υγείας), the National Healthcare System of Greece. The structured areas of the hospital cover 50,000 sqm, built in several time points, to cope with the emerging needs.

== History ==
AHEPA University Hospital was founded in 1947 with the economic support of the AHEPA, which is a Greek organization in the United States of America. It opened for the public in 1951, during the celebration of the 25th anniversary of Aristotle University of Thessaloniki. Practically though, the hospital started its normal operation in March 1953.

In 1955, the Swedish philanthropic organisation Rädda Barnen (Swedish chapter of Save the Children) made a new donation to the hospital. This donation was used in order to construct the Paediatric pavilion with a total of 100 beds. The university's paediatric clinic was settled in this new pavilion in 1958.
