= Nicholas Papapolitis =

Greek politician and academic

Nicholas Papapolitis Senior (Greek: Νικόλας Παπαπολίτης) (1915–1993) was a Greek politician and professor of the Aristotle University of Thessaloniki.

Papapolitis was professor of commercial and shipping law, an international lawyer, and author of many legal books. He served as a legal advisor to a number of Greek governments and prime ministers on such major issues as Greece's entry into NATO and the EEC. Ηe was also a member of the legal team that drafted Greece's new constitution in 1974. From 1974 to 1981, he was a member of the Greek Parliament, heading many parliamentary committees which drafted several acts of major importance.

Papapolitis practised law in New York City from 1946 to 1950 and, upon his return to Greece in 1950, he headed the law offices of Papapolitis & Papapolitis. He was the father of John Papapolitis and the grandfather of Nicholas Papapolitis, the current Managing Partner of Papapolitis & Papapolitis and Chairman of the Ever Excel Group.
