= European Road Transport Research Advisory Council =

European organisation on road transport

The European Road Transport Research Advisory Council (ERTRAC) is a European organisation on road transport, which brings together several road transport stakeholders, such as consumers, vehicle manufacturers, component suppliers, road infrastructure operators and developers, service providers, energy suppliers, research organisations, cities and regions as well as public authorities at both European Union and national level.

The programme is a joint initiative (Public-Private Partnership) of the European Commission, representing the European Communities, and the industry. The main objective of ERTRAC is to produce a Strategic Research Agenda.

== See also ==
- European Technology Platform
- Joint Technology Initiative
- ACEA agreement
