= EEGECS =

EEGECS, or European Education in Geodetic Engineering, Cartography and Surveying, is a European, European Union-funded consortium, or network, of institutes of higher learning aimed at enhancing dialogue and exchange of information, and to move towards the creation of a "European Area of Geodetic Engineering, Cartography and Surveying".

The initiative towards formation of EEGECS came from the Polytechnical University of Valencia. It started operations in 2002 and comprised 100 institutions from 28 countries. EU-funding for its activities lasted for three years, plus one more year dedicated to dissemination activities. The network consists of six working groups.
