= Dimitris P. Kraniotis =

Greek poet (b. 1966)

Dimitris P. Kraniotis (Greek: Δημήτρης Π Κρανιώτης; born 1966) is a contemporary Greek poet.

== Biography ==
D. P. Kraniotis (b. 15 July 1966) was born in Larissa prefecture in central Greece and grew up in Stomio (Larissa). He studied at the Medical School of the Aristotle University in Thessaloniki (Greece) and obtained a Master of Science (MSc) at the Medical School of the University of Thessaly (Greece). He lives and works as internal medicine specialist physician in Larissa (Greece).

He is the author of 12 poetry books in 7 languages (Greek, English, French, Romanian, Albanian, Italian, Spanish) and the Editor-in-chief of an international anthology in English (205 poets from 65 countries).

He has participated in several International Poetry Festivals. His poetry has been translated into 40 languages (English, French, Polish, Czech, Spanish, Turkish, Bulgarian, Romanian, Italian, Albanian, Arabic, Serbian, Dutch, Portuguese, Russian, Chinese, Japanese, German, Slovak, Macedonian, Persian, Bengali, Kurdish, Vietnamese, Gujarati, Kazakh, Tamil, Danish, Swahili, Hebrew, Uzbek, Hungarian, Estonian, Ukrainian, Korean, Tajik, Hindi, Azerbaijani, Yoruba and Armenian) and published in many countries around the World.

In 2011 the 22nd World Congress of Poets took place in Larissa, Greece. with D. P. Kraniotis as president. He also founded the 1st Mediterranean Poetry Festival in Larissa. He is member of several literary organizations (National Society of Greek Literary Writers, Hellenic Literary Society, Hellenic Society of Writing Physicians, World Poetry Movement, Poets of the Planet, World Poets Society, United Poets Laureate International, Poetas del Mundo, etc.). Also, he is Chairman of the Writers for Peace Committee of PEN Greece and editor of the international poetry magazine "World Poets Magazine" and the Greek poetry magazine "Poetics @ GR" (Τετράδιο Ποίησης).

== Poetry ==
- Ίχνη ("Traces") Larissa, Greece 1985 Greek
- Πήλινα πρόσωπα ("Clay faces") Larissa, Greece 1992 Greek
- Νοητή γραμμή ("Fictitious line") Emm. Lavdakis, Larissa, Greece 2005 ISBN 960-90107-1-7 Greek - English and French translation
- Dunes-Dune ("Dunes") Orient Occident, Bucharest, Romania 2007 ISBN 978-973-8430-44-0 French and Romanian translation
- Ενδόγραμμα ("Endogram") Malliaris Paedia, Thessaloniki, Greece 2010 ISBN 978-960-457-417-9 Greek
- Edda ("Edda") Orient Occident, Bucharest, Romania 2010 ISBN 978-973-8430-77-8 French and Romanian translation
- Iluzione ("Illusions") Rawex Coms, Bucharest, Romania 2010, ISBN 978-606-8231-06-8 Albanian translation
- World Poetry 2011 (Anthology) United Poets Laureate International, Larissa, Greece 2011 ISBN 978-960-93-3176-0 English
- Foglie vocali ("Leaves vowels") Pluriversum Edizioni, Ferrara, Italy 2017 ISBN 978-0-244-95152-8 Italian translation
- Γραβάτα δημοσίας αιδούς ("Tie of public decency") Kedros, Athens, Greece 2018 ISBN 978-960-04-4896-2 Greek
- Menos uno ("Minus one") Padilla Libros, Seville, Spain 2022 ISBN 978-84-8434-743-9 Spanish translation
- Ρυτίδες στον καφέ ("Wrinkles in the coffee") Kedros, Athens, Greece 2024 ISBN 978-960-04-5467-3 Greek
- Duke dëgjuar të njëjtin tingull ("Hearing the same sound") IWA Bogdani, Pristina, Kosovo 2025 ISBN 978-9951-394-63-5 Albanian
