= Thessaloniki History Centre =

History museum in Thessaloniki, Greece

Coordinates: 40.6292°N 22.9500°E

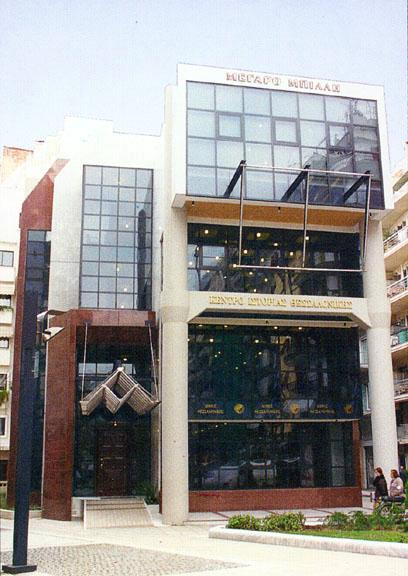
View from outside

The Thessaloniki History Centre was established by the Municipal Council of Thessaloniki, the largest city in northern Greece, in 1983. It has occupied its present premises (the gift of Anastasios and Ioulia Billis) in Ippodromiou Square since 1995.

The purpose of the centre is to collect, rescue, record, and preserve printed, written, and audio-visual material relating to the history of the city and wider area of Thessaloniki. It also promotes and facilitates historical research relating to Thessaloniki and seeks to rouse the interest of foreigners in the modern city and its historical past. It is governed by an Advisory Committee made up of distinguished scholars.

The centre has preserved the Municipal Archive and is classifying it, and has also acquired a number of private archives by gift or purchase. It has built up a history library, comprising 4,000 books, 3,000 photographs, 5,000 postcards, posters, videocassettes, and historical maps.

It publishes its research work with periodic exhibitions illustrating the historical continuity of Thessaloniki and the wider area of Macedonia, organizes conferences and lecture series, and hosts events organized by other institutions with related interests. The History Centre also produces a scholarly journal titled Thessaloniki, containing original scholarly articles, and books on Thessaloniki and its history.

The Centre intends to convert the citys archives into electronic form to make them more accessible to researchers, and to link up to the Internet so that information and knowledge about the history of Thessaloniki will be accessible to a wider public.

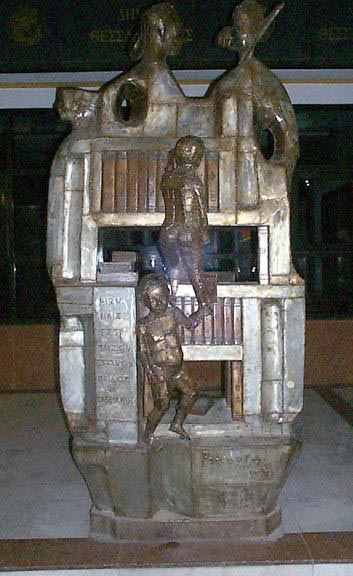

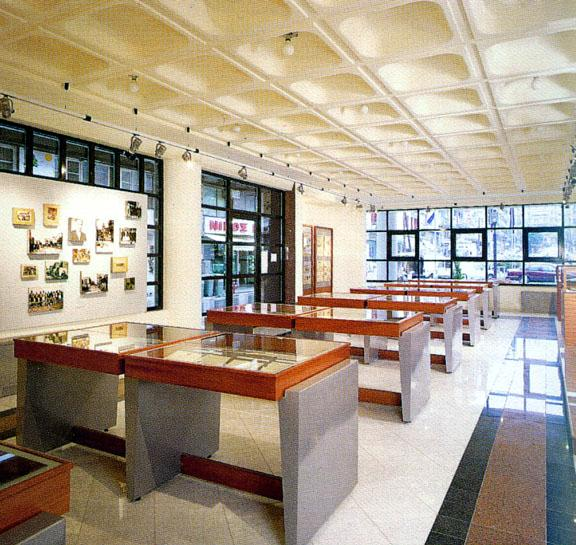
Interior view 1

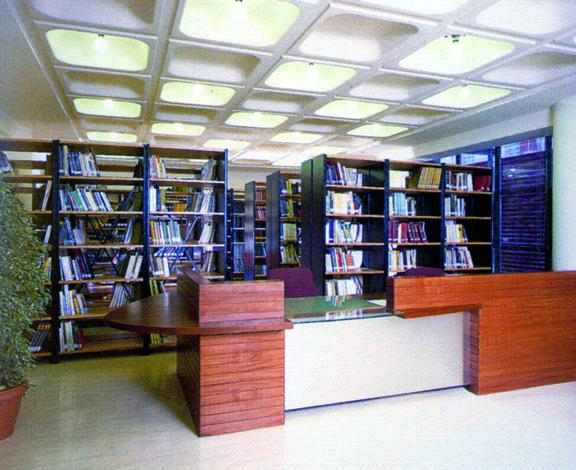
Interior view 2

== Sources ==
- This article incorporates text from the corresponding article at the Museums of Macedonia website, commissioned by the Macedonian Heritage foundation, written by Vlasis Vlasidis, and published under a CC-BY-SA-3.0 license.
