= Analipsi metro station =

Metro station in Thessaloniki, Greece

Ανάληψη Analipsi
- Station's Escalators

General information
- Location: Thessaloniki; Greece
- Coordinates: 40°36′20″N 22°57′28″E
- Owner: Elliniko Metro
- Operator: Thessaloniki Metro Automatic S.A. (THEMA)
- Transit authority: TheTA
- Line: Thessaloniki Metro Line 1 Thessaloniki Metro Line 2
- Platforms: 1 (island)
- Tracks: 2

Construction
- Structure type: Underground
- Accessible: Yes

History
- Opened: 30 November 2024

Services
Preceding station	Thessaloniki Metro	Following station
Fleming towards New Railway Station	Line 1	25 Martiou towards Nea Elvetia
Fleming towards New Railway Station	Line 2	25 Martiou towards Mikra
- Track layout
- Schematic only – not to scale.
Location

Analipsi metro station (Greek: Ανάληψη,, lit. 'Ascension') is a metro station serving Thessaloniki Metro's Line 1 and Line 2. It is named after the Thessaloniki district of Analipsi, in which it is located. Construction of this station proved difficult due to the narrowness of Delphon Street, under which the station was to be built. For this reason, it was decided to construct it using the cut-and-cover method, leading to the closure of a 250m section of the street. It entered service in 2024.

This station also appears in the 1988 Thessaloniki Metro proposal.

== See also ==
- List of Thessaloniki Metro stations
- Media related to Analipsi metro station at Wikimedia Commons
