= Venizelou metro station =

Metro station in Thessaloniki, Greece

Βενιζέλου Venizelou
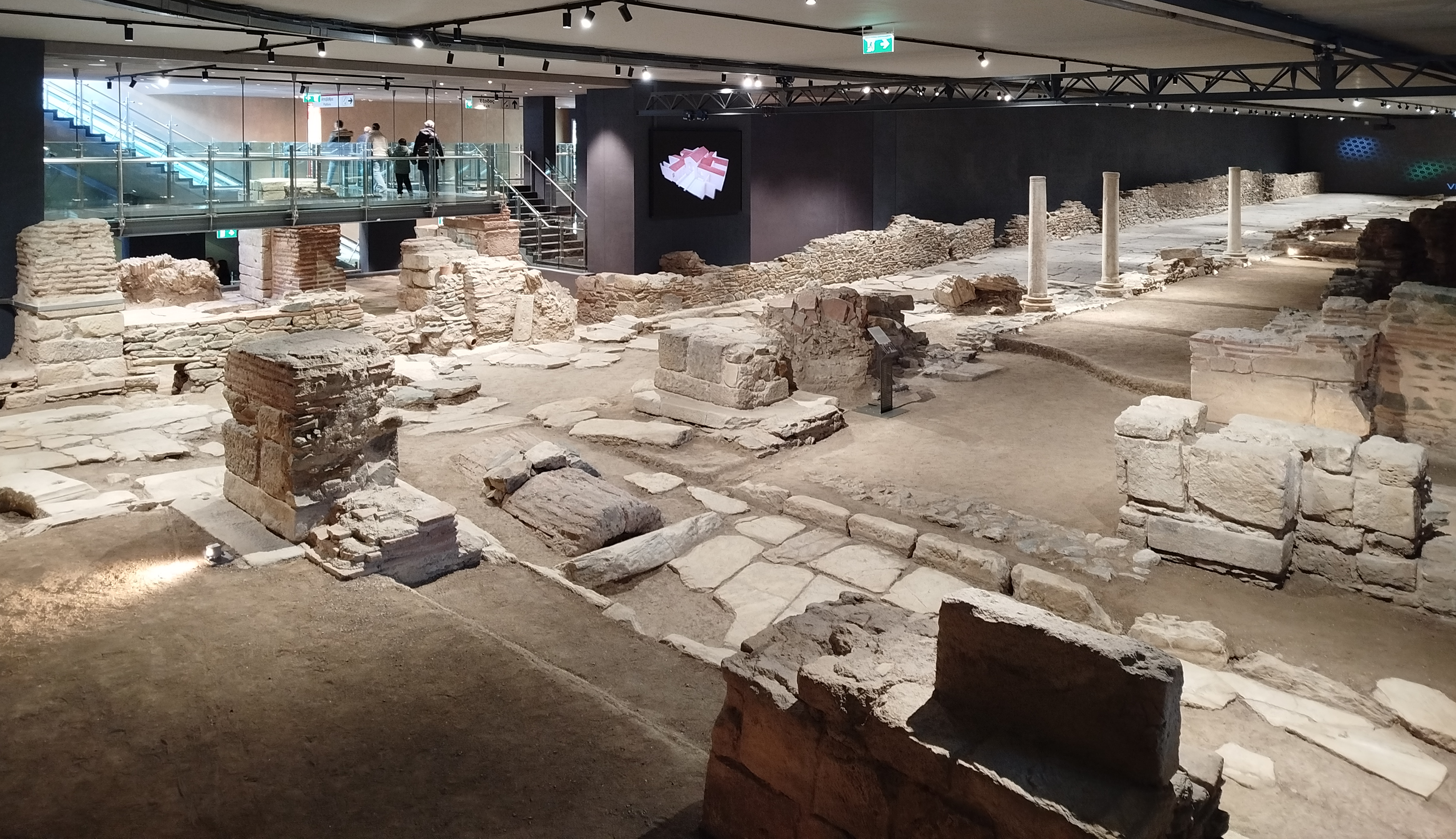
- The archaeological site of the Roman and later Byzantine Decumanus Maximus on the first level

General information
- Location: Thessaloniki; Greece
- Coordinates: 40°38′13″N 22°56′31″E
- Owner: Elliniko Metro
- Operator: Thessaloniki Metro Automatic S.A. (THEMA)
- Transit authority: TheTA
- Line: Thessaloniki Metro Line 1 Thessaloniki Metro Line 2
- Platforms: 1 (island)
- Tracks: 2

Construction
- Structure type: Underground
- Accessible: Yes

History
- Opened: 30 November 2024

Services
| Preceding station | Thessaloniki Metro | Following station |
|---|---|---|
| Dimokratias towards New Railway Station | Line 1 | Agias Sofias towards Nea Elvetia |
| Dimokratias towards New Railway Station | Line 2 | Agias Sofias towards Mikra |
- Track layout
- Schematic only – not to scale.
Location

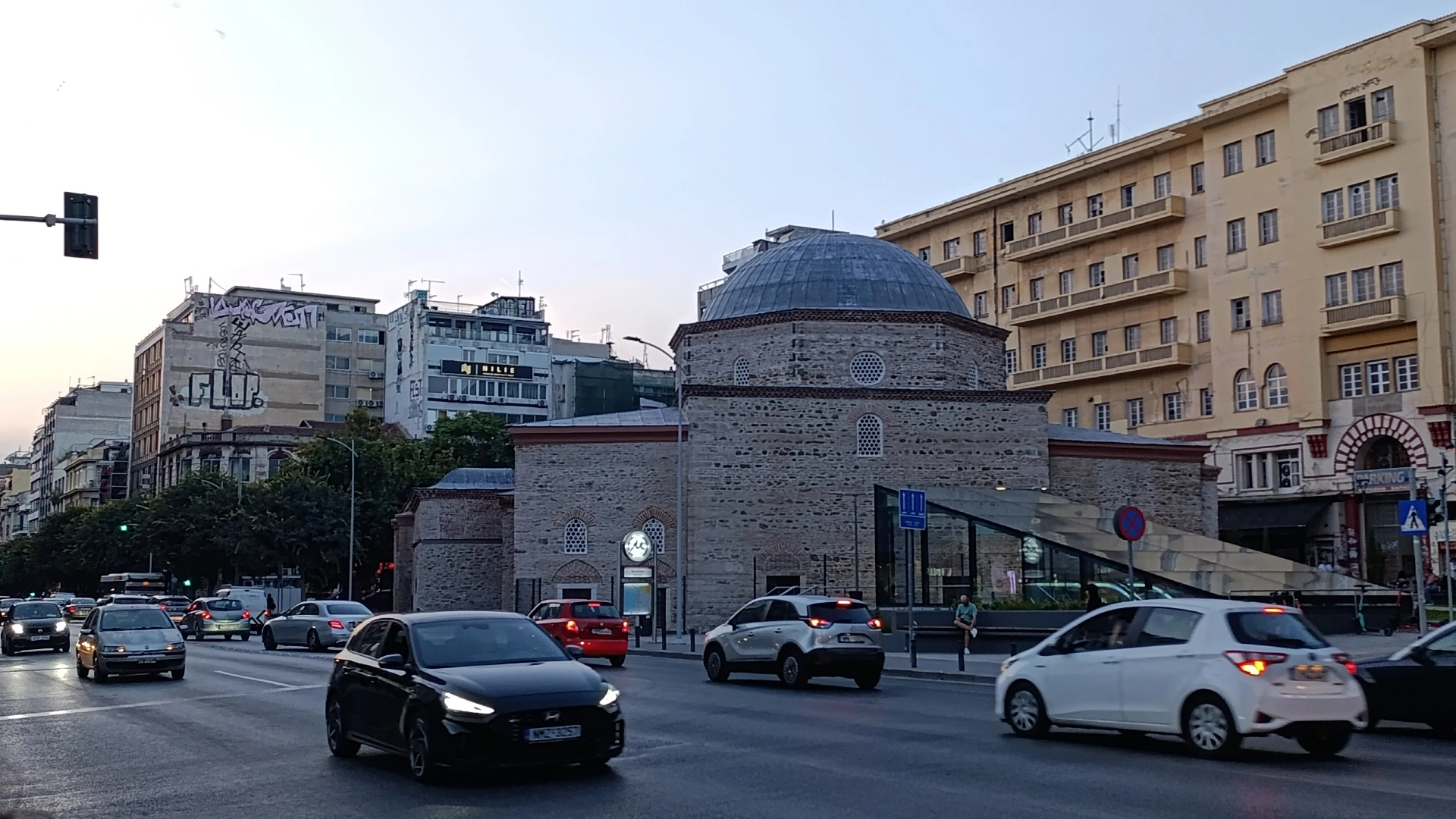
Venizelou Station, Alkazar and the former City Hall

Venizelou (Greek: Βενιζέλου,, lit. 'Venizelos [Street]') is a metro station serving Thessaloniki Metro's Line 1 and Line 2. The station is named after the adjacent Venizelou Street, which in turn is named after Eleftherios Venizelos, Liberal Prime Minister of Greece. It entered service in 2024. Construction of this station had been held back by major archaeological finds, and it is designated as a high-importance archaeological site by Attiko Metro, the company overseeing its construction. The design of the station interiors was kept a secret until a day before its opening, and it was revealed in a ceremony attended by both Prime Minister Kyriakos Mitsotakis and President Katerina Sakellaropoulou.

At this station, Roman Thessaloniki's marble-clad and column-lined Decumanus Maximus (main east-west avenue), along with shops and houses, was found running along the route of the Via Egnatia (modern Egnatia Street) at 5.4 metres (18 ft) below ground level. The discovery was so major that it delayed the entire Metro project for years. A historian dubbed the discovery "the Byzantine Pompeii". Attiko Metro wanted to disassemble the road and re-assemble it elsewhere, while the City Council wanted Attiko Metro to redesign its network to accommodate the discovery in situ. Ultimately the case reached Greece's Council of State and Attiko Metro re-designed the metro line, sinking the tunnels to a depth ranging from 14 metres (46 ft) to 31 metres (102 ft), and making provisions for mini museums within the metro stations, similar to those of Athens Metro stations like Syntagma, which houses the Syntagma Metro Station Archaeological Collection.

Venizelou station also features an open archaeological site, the first of its kind anywhere in a metro station, in order to maintain the road in its original location. At the next station, Agias Sofias, where the same road was unearthed (and where it is arguably more important, as a public square was found as well), the road will be disassembled and reassembled elsewhere.

Venizelou station also appears in the 1988 Thessaloniki Metro proposal under the name Alkazar. Alkazar is the popular name for Hamza Bey Mosque, a landmark on Egnatia and Venizelou streets.

== See also ==
- List of Thessaloniki Metro stations
- Media related to Venizelou metro station at Wikimedia Commons
