= Agias Sofias metro station =

Metro station in Thessaloniki, Greece

Αγίας Σοφίας Agias Sofias
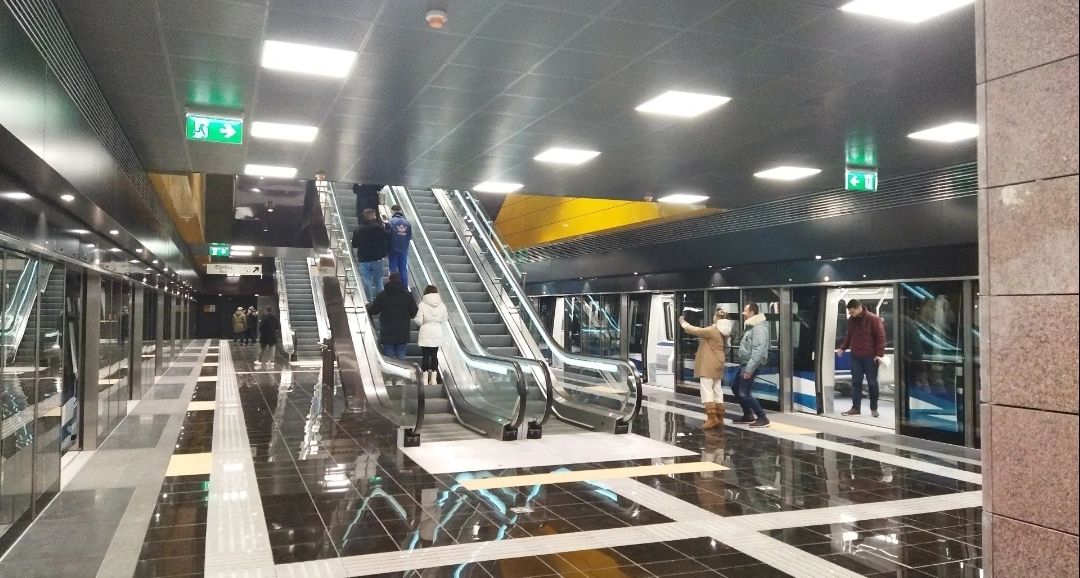

General information
- Location: Thessaloniki; Greece
- Coordinates: 40°38′04″N 22°56′47″E
- Owner: Elliniko Metro
- Operator: Thessaloniki Metro Automatic S.A. (THEMA)
- Transit authority: TheTA
- Line: Thessaloniki Metro Line 1 Thessaloniki Metro Line 2
- Platforms: 1 (island)
- Tracks: 2

Construction
- Structure type: Underground
- Accessible: Yes

History
- Opened: 30 November 2024

Services
Preceding station	Thessaloniki Metro	Following station
Venizelou towards New Railway Station	Line 1	Sintrivani towards Nea Elvetia
Venizelou towards New Railway Station	Line 2	Sintrivani towards Mikra
- Track layout
- Schematic only – not to scale.
Location

Agias Sofias metro station (Greek: Αγίας Σοφίας,, lit. 'Holy Wisdom') is a metro station serving Thessaloniki Metro's Line 1 and Line 2. The station is named after the church of Hagia Sophia, located nearby. It entered service in 2024. Construction of this station had been held back by major archaeological finds, and it is designated as a high-importance archaeological site by Attiko Metro, the company overseeing its construction. Here, as well as at Venizelou, Roman Thessaloniki's marble-clad and column-lined Decumanus Maximus (main east–west avenue), along with shops and houses, was found running along the route of the Via Egnatia (modern Egnatia Street) at 5.4 metres (18 ft) below ground level. Additionally, a public square was also found at this station. The discovery was so major that it delayed the entire Metro project for years. A historian dubbed the discovery "the Byzantine Pompeii".

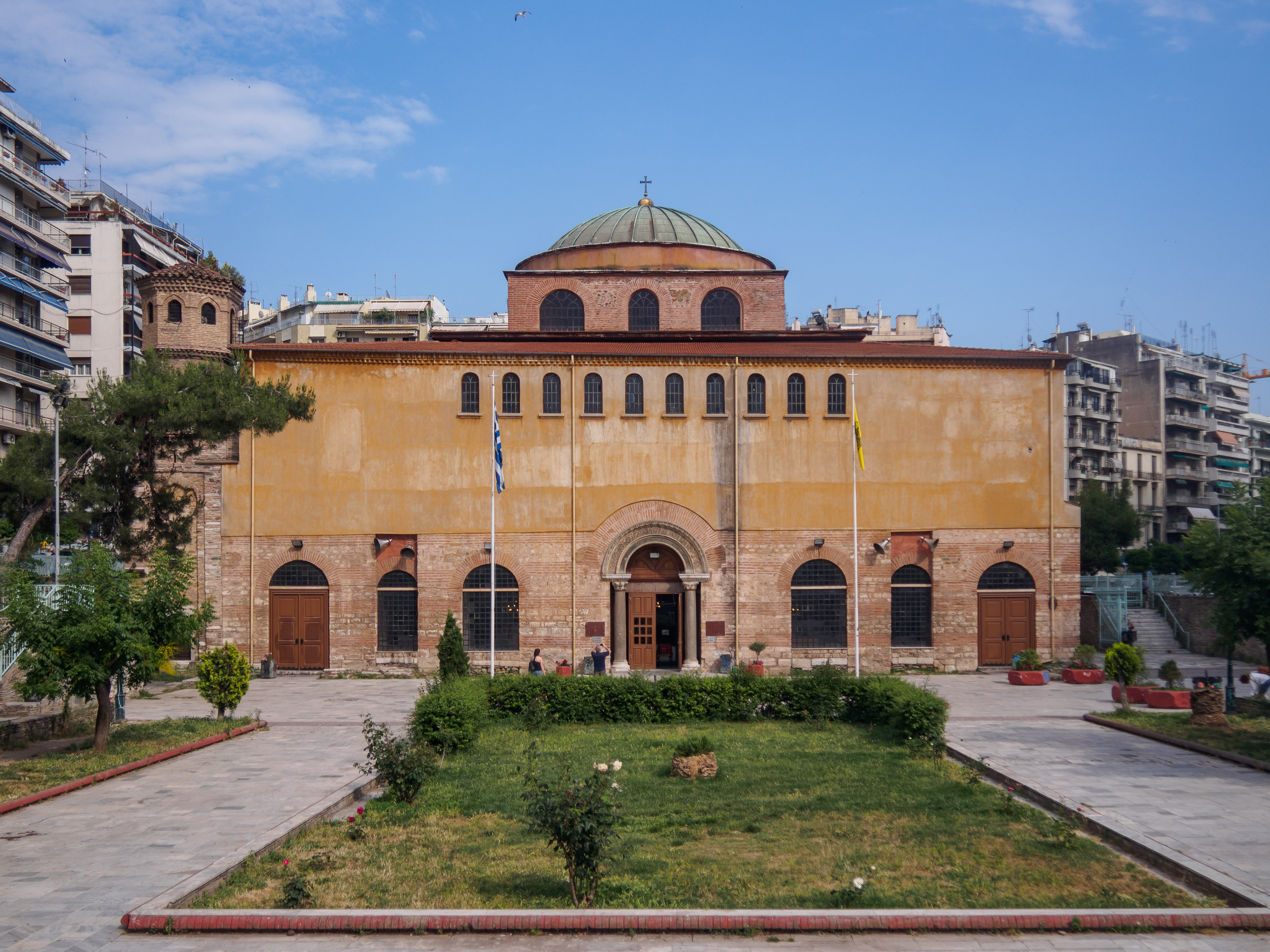
The nearby Church of Holy Wisdom (Hagia Sophia) of Thessaloniki, a UNESCO World Heritage Site, for which the station is named.

Agias Sofias station features a mini museum within the station, similar to those of Athens Metro stations like Syntagma, which houses the Syntagma Metro Station Archaeological Collection. Unlike Venizelou, however, the archaeological finds is not kept in situ; they were disassembled and reassembled elsewhere.

The station also appears in the 1988 Thessaloniki Metro proposal.

== See also ==
- List of Thessaloniki Metro stations
- Media related to Agias Sofias metro station at Wikimedia Commons
