= Dimokratias metro station =

Metro station in Thessaloniki, Greece

Δημοκρατίας Dimokratias
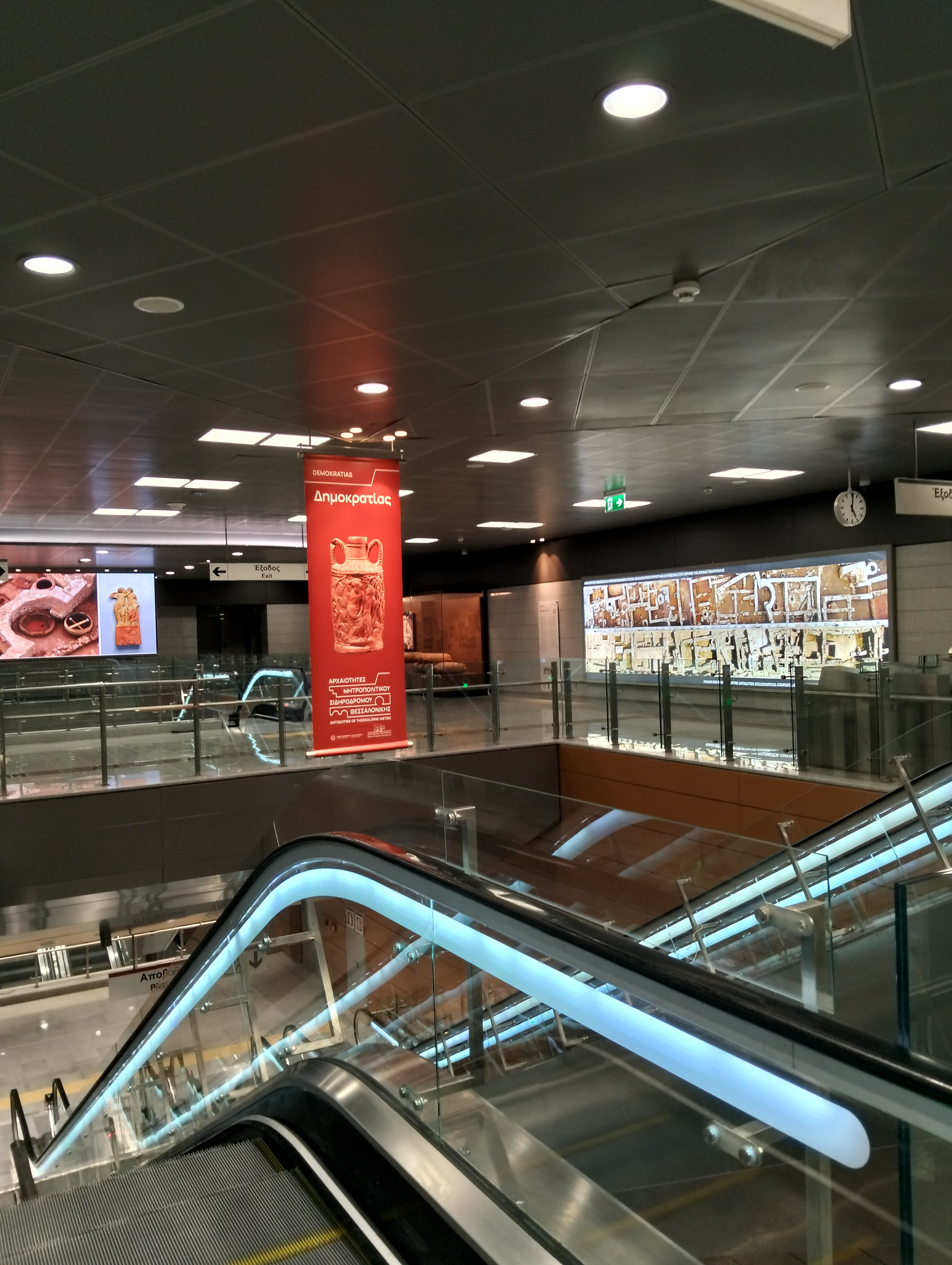
- Escalators down to the platforms

General information
- Location: Thessaloniki; Greece
- Coordinates: 40°38′28″N 22°56′03″E
- Owner: Elliniko Metro
- Operator: Thessaloniki Metro Automatic S.A. (THEMA)
- Transit authority: TheTA
- Line: Thessaloniki Metro Line 1 Thessaloniki Metro Line 2
- Platforms: 1 (island)
- Tracks: 2

Construction
- Structure type: Underground
- Accessible: Yes

History
- Opened: 30 November 2024

Services
Preceding station	Thessaloniki Metro	Following station
New Railway Station Terminus	Line 1	Venizelou towards Nea Elvetia
New Railway Station Terminus	Line 2	Venizelou towards Mikra
- Track layout
- Schematic only – not to scale.
Location

Dimokratias (Greek: Δημοκρατίας,, lit. 'Democracy [Square]') is a metro station serving Thessaloniki Metro's Line 1 and Line 2. It entered service in 2024. Construction of this station had been held back by major archaeological finds, and it is designated as a high-importance archaeological site by Attiko Metro, the company overseeing its construction. At this station, an ancient and early Christian cemetery & church were found, as well as Ottoman inns and warehouses. The station was initially located further west, but was moved eastward so that it falls outside of the medieval Walls of Thessaloniki, thus reducing the chance of major archaeological works.

Dimokratias station also appears in the 1988 Thessaloniki Metro proposal under the name Vardari. Vardari Square is the old name of Dimokratias Square, named after the Vardari Fort and the associated gate on the Walls of Thessaloniki leading to the Vardar river (Axios in Greek). The name was changed because it is not of Greek origin.

== See also ==
- List of Thessaloniki Metro stations
- Media related to Dimokratias metro station at Wikimedia Commons
