= Voulgari metro station =

Metro station in Thessaloniki, Greece

Βούλγαρη Voulgari

General information
- Location: Thessaloniki; Greece
- Coordinates: 40°35′40″N 22°57′39″E
- Owner: Elliniko Metro
- Operator: Thessaloniki Metro Automatic S.A. (THEMA)
- Transit authority: TheTA
- Line: Thessaloniki Metro Line 1
- Platforms: 1 (island)
- Tracks: 2

Construction
- Structure type: Underground
- Accessible: Yes

History
- Opened: 30 November 2024

Services
Preceding station	Thessaloniki Metro	Following station
25 Martiou towards New Railway Station	Line 1	Nea Elvetia Terminus
- Track layout
- Schematic only – not to scale.
Location

Voulgari (Greek: Βούλγαρη,) is a metro station serving Thessaloniki Metro's Line 1. The station is named after Voulgari Street, under which it sits, itself named after Dimitrios Voulgaris, Prime Minister of Greece. It is situated at the junction of aforementioned Voulgari Street and Papadaki Street in the neighbourhood of Depo. It entered service in 2024.

This station also appears in the 1988 Thessaloniki Metro proposal.

== See also ==
- List of Thessaloniki Metro stations
- Media related to Voulgari metro station at Wikimedia Commons
