= Egnatia Street =

Egnatia Street or Egnatia Odos may refer to the following roads:

- A2 motorway in northern Greece, commonly known as the Egnatia Odos
- Via Egnatia, a Roman road
- Egnatia Street, Thessaloniki, a commercial street
