= Line 1 (Thessaloniki Metro) =

Greek rapid transit line

Προς Νέος Σιδ. Σταθμός/Νέα Ελβετία To New Railway Station/Nea Elvetia

Overview
- Locale: Thessaloniki
- Termini: New Railway Station; Nea Elvetia
- Stations: 13
- Colour on map: Red

Service
- Type: Deep Level
- System: Thessaloniki Metro
- Operator: Thessaloniki Metro Automatic (TheMA)
- Depot: Pylaia
- Rolling stock: 18 AnsaldoBreda Driverless Metro

History
- Opened: 30 November 2024

Technical
- Line length: 9.6 km (6.0 mi)
- Track gauge: 1,435 mm (4 ft 8 1/2 in) standard gauge
- Electrification: 750 V DC

Topographic map of Line 1

Line 1 of the Thessaloniki Metro, also known as the Base Project (Greek: Βασικό Έργο), is a deep-level underground rapid transit line in Thessaloniki, Greece, connecting New Railway Station in the west with Nea Elvetia in the east, before continuing on to the Pylaia. The line opened on 30 November 2024. Discovery of historical sites in 2019 halted work for 28 months while excavations took place. Of the line's 13 stations 11 are shared with Line 2, where the two lines separate at 25 Martiou.

Construction costs for the line are set at €1.05 billion ($1.19 billion), enough to classify it as a megaproject.

== Stations ==
Thessaloniki Metro Line 1 Stations
Name		Opening date	Connections	Municipality
English	Greek	Opening date	Connections	Municipality
New Railway Station	Ν. Σιδ. Σταθμός	30 November 2024	Thessaloniki Metro Line 2	Thessaloniki
Dimokratias	Δημοκρατίας	30 November 2024	Thessaloniki Metro Line 2	Thessaloniki
Venizelou	Βενιζέλου	30 November 2024	Thessaloniki Metro Line 2	Thessaloniki
Agias Sofias	Αγίας Σοφίας	30 November 2024	Thessaloniki Metro Line 2	Thessaloniki
Sintrivani	Σιντριβάνι	30 November 2024	Thessaloniki Metro Line 2	Thessaloniki
Panepistimio	Πανεπιστήμιο	30 November 2024	Thessaloniki Metro Line 2	Thessaloniki
Papafi	Παπάφη	30 November 2024	Thessaloniki Metro Line 2	Thessaloniki
Efkleidis	Ευκλείδης	30 November 2024	Thessaloniki Metro Line 2	Thessaloniki
Fleming	Φλέμινγκ	30 November 2024	Thessaloniki Metro Line 2	Thessaloniki
Analipsi	Ανάληψη	30 November 2024	Thessaloniki Metro Line 2	Thessaloniki
25 Martiou	25ης Μαρτίου	30 November 2024	Thessaloniki Metro Line 2	Thessaloniki
Voulgari	Βούλγαρη	30 November 2024	none	Thessaloniki
Nea Elvetia	Νέα Ελβετία	30 November 2024	02X Shuttle bus to Thessaloniki Airport	Thessaloniki

== See also ==
- Thessaloniki Metro
- Thessaloniki Metro Line 2
- Thessaloniki Urban Transport Organization
