= Line 2 (Thessaloniki Metro) =

Greek rapid transit line

Προς Νέος Σιδ. Σταθμός/Μίκρα To New Railway Station/Mikra

Overview
- Termini: New Railway Station; Mikra
- Stations: 16; 29 (incl. planned extensions)
- Colour on map: Blue

Service
- Type: Deep Level
- System: Thessaloniki Metro
- Operator: Thessaloniki Metro Automatic S.A. (THEMA)
- Depot: Pylaia (via Line 1)
- Rolling stock: AnsaldoBreda Driverless Metro

History
- Opened: 27 August 2026 (Standalone section: 25 Martiou - Mikra)

Technical
- Line length: 11.38 km
- Track gauge: 1,435 mm (4 ft 8 1/2 in) standard gauge
- Electrification: 750 V DC

Topographic map of Line 2

Line 2 of the Thessaloniki Metro, also known as the Kalamaria Extension (Greek: Επέκταση Καλαμαριάς), is a deep-level underground rapid transit line in Thessaloniki, Greece, connecting New Railway Station in the west with Mikra in the south-east. The section of the line between New Railway Station and 25 Martiou, consisting of 11 stations, is shared with Line 1, where the lines then separate and Line 2 terminates at Mikra. The section between 25 Martiou and Mikra started operations on 27 August 2026.

Construction costs for the line (between 25 Martiou and Mikra) are set at €570 million.

Line 2 is to be extended further, with an eastern extension towards Thessaloniki Airport (4 stations) and an extension in the northern western suburbs (6 stations). The initial plan called for two extensions to the northwest to be separate lines. In 2018, they were merged into a single circular line, however by 2024 it was decided once again to develop the extensions separately, as part of the announcement of a new third line for the metro.

== Stations ==
Thessaloniki Metro Line 2 Stations
Name		Opening date	Connections	Municipality
English	Greek	Opening date	Connections	Municipality
New Railway Station	Ν. Σιδ. Σταθμός	30 November 2024	Thessaloniki Metro Line 1	Thessaloniki
Dimokratias	Δημοκρατίας	30 November 2024	Thessaloniki Metro Line 1	Thessaloniki
Venizelou	Βενιζέλου	30 November 2024	Thessaloniki Metro Line 1	Thessaloniki
Agias Sofias	Αγίας Σοφίας	30 November 2024	Thessaloniki Metro Line 1	Thessaloniki
Sintrivani	Σιντριβάνι	30 November 2024	Thessaloniki Metro Line 1	Thessaloniki
Panepistimio	Πανεπιστήμιο	30 November 2024	Thessaloniki Metro Line 1	Thessaloniki
Papafi	Παπάφη	30 November 2024	Thessaloniki Metro Line 1	Thessaloniki
Efkleidis	Ευκλείδης	30 November 2024	Thessaloniki Metro Line 1	Thessaloniki
Fleming	Φλέμινγκ	30 November 2024	Thessaloniki Metro Line 1	Thessaloniki
Analipsi	Ανάληψη	30 November 2024	Thessaloniki Metro Line 1	Thessaloniki
25 Martiou	25ης Μαρτίου	30 November 2024	Thessaloniki Metro Line 1	Thessaloniki
Nomarchia	Νομαρχία	27 August 2026	none	Thessaloniki
Kalamaria	Καλαμαριά	27 August 2026	none	Kalamaria
Aretsou	Aρετσού	27 August 2026	none	Kalamaria
Nea Krini	Νέα Κρήνη	27 August 2026	none	Kalamaria
Mikra	Μίκρα	27 August 2026	X3 Shuttle bus to Thessaloniki Airport	Kalamaria

== See also ==
- Thessaloniki Metro
- Thessaloniki Metro Line 1
- Thessaloniki Urban Transport Organization
