= Thessaloniki Metro =

Greek driverless rapid-transit system

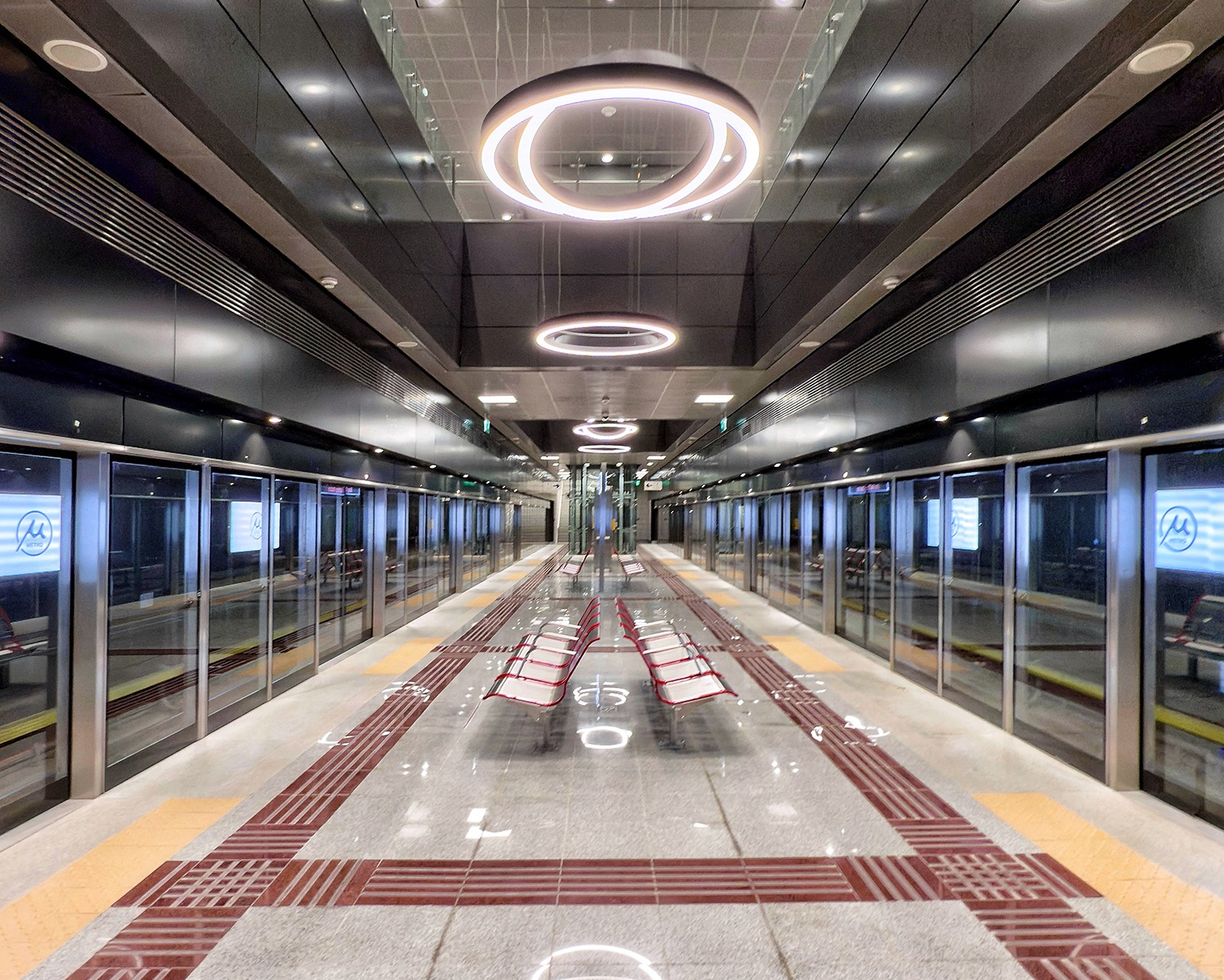
- New Railway Station, the western terminus of both lines

Overview
- Native name: Μετρό Θεσσαλονίκης
- Owner: Elliniko Metro
- Locale: Thessaloniki, Greece
- Transit type: Rapid transit
- Number of lines: 2
- Number of stations: 18
- Daily ridership: 126,000
- Annual ridership: 46 million
- Website: www.thessmetro.gr

Operation
- Began operation: 30 November 2024; 23 months ago (Note: Line 1 opened on 30 November 2024, and Line 2 (between 25 Martiou and Mikra) followed on 27 August 2026.)
- Operator: Thessaloniki Metro Automatic (THEMA) (Note: Thessaloniki Metro Automatic is a consortium of Azienda Trasporti Milanesi (51%) and Egis Group (49%).)
- Character: Underground
- Number of vehicles: 33 Hitachi Rail Italy Driverless Metro
- Headway: 3.5 minutes

Technical
- System length: 14.4 km (8.9 mi)
- Track gauge: 1,435 mm (4 ft 8 1/2 in) standard gauge
- Electrification: 750 V DC third rail
- Top speed: 80 km/h (50 mph)

Thessaloniki Metro (Greek: Μετρό Θεσσαλονίκης,) is an underground rapid transit system in Thessaloniki, Greece's second largest city. The system consists of two lines with 18 stations. It is fully automated and driverless, the first system of its kind in Greece, and is operated by Thessaloniki Metro Automatic (THEMA), a Franco-Italian consortium.

Estimates for the cost of the megaproject are at €3 billion ($3.42 billion today), including €600 million ($686 million) in future interest payments. The project is primarily funded with loans from the European Investment Bank (EIB) and the European Regional Development Fund (ERDF), as well as funds from the Greek government. Construction by a Greco-Italian consortium is overseen by Elliniko Metro, the Greek state-owned company which oversaw the construction of the Athens Metro and Athens Tram.

Proposed during the 1910s and first seriously planned in the 1980s, construction of the main line began in 2006 and on the Kalamaria extension in 2013. After years of delays, due to archaeological discoveries and the Greek financial crisis, the 9.6 km (6.0 mi) Line 1 opened on 30 November 2024, with Line 2 adding a further 4.8 km (3.0 mi) of tunnels and 5 more stations to the system on 27 August 2026. A further extension of Line 1 is planned with ERDF funds of the 2028–2032 cycle.

Route of the Thessaloniki Metro

== Name ==
The system is commonly known as the Thessaloniki Metro (Greek: Μετρό Θεσσαλονίκης, romanized: Metró Thessaloníkis, [meˈtro θesaloˈnicis],), but is sometimes also referred to by the more formal name of Thessaloniki Metropolitan Railway (Greek: Μητροπολιτικός Σιδηρόδρομος Θεσσαλονίκης, romanized: Mitropolitikós Sidiródromos Thessaloníkis,).

== History ==
=== Early proposals ===
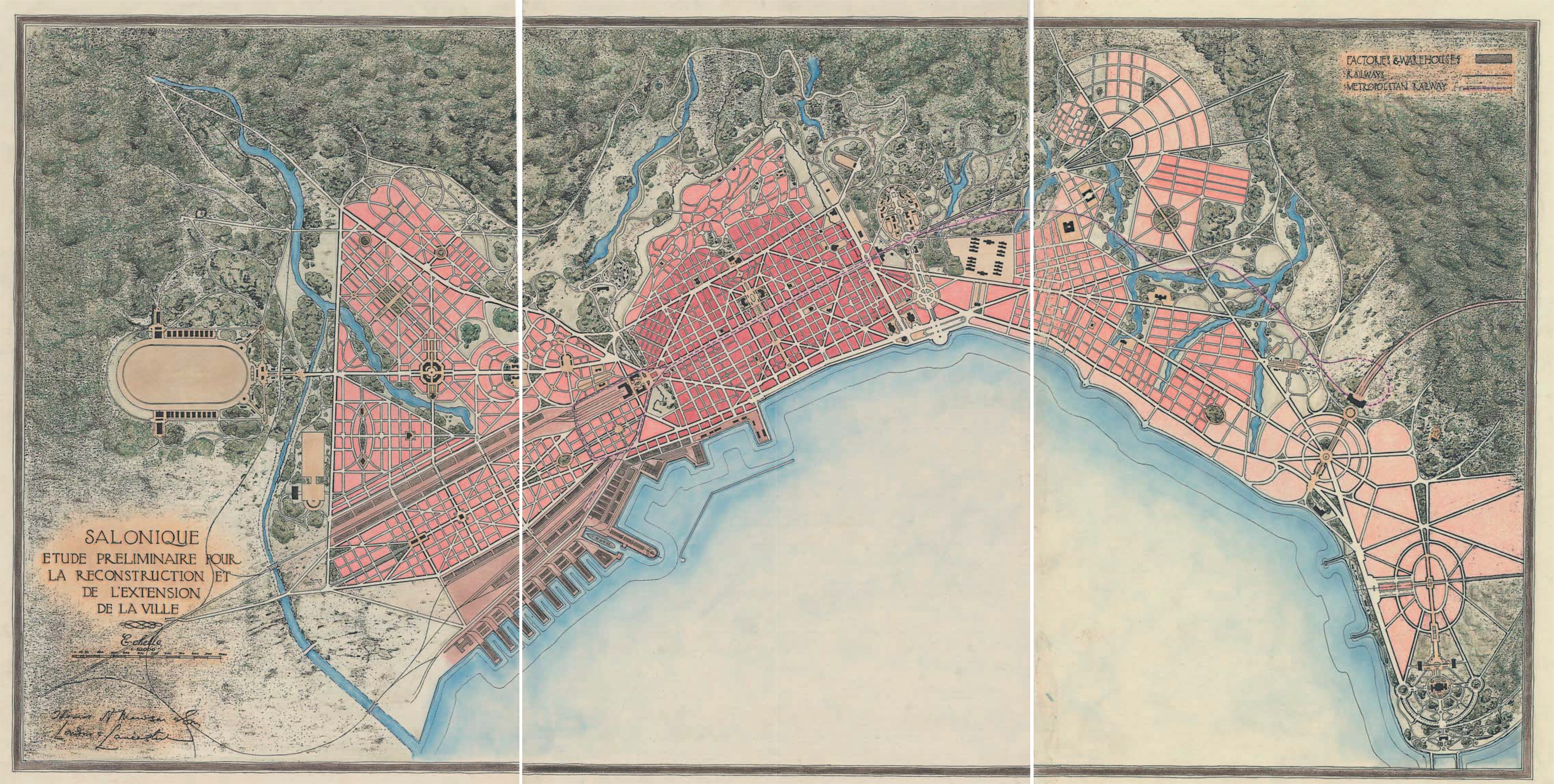
Map of the Thomas Mawson metropolitan railway proposal (c. 1918), running between the 1 New Railway Station and 2 Nea Elvetia. The line is underground along Egnatia street, but becomes overground beyond the University.

Ernest Hébrard and Thomas Hayton Mawson were the first to propose the creation of a metro system in Thessaloniki in 1918 as part of a commission appointed by the government of Eleftherios Venizelos to redesign the city after the Great Fire of 1917, which had devastated the city centre. They proposed an underground railway to connect the New Railway Station and Nea Elvetia, terminus for a proposed railway connecting Mikra and the Strymonic Gulf. Although Thessaloniki has grown considerably since Hébrard's original design, Line 1 is almost identical to his plan and runs from his proposed new railway station to the suburb of Nea Elvetia.

A circular metro line was proposed in 1968, extending to the airport and crossing the Thermaic Gulf in a tunnel. The projects never materialised. The Thessaloniki chapter of the Technical Chamber of Greece started considering a metro system in 1976, the same year a funding code for the project was incorporated into the national budget under Konstantinos Karamanlis. In 1978, Savvas Pylarinos, governor of the Thessaloniki region, recommended that a metro be incorporated into the city plan.

The idea of a metro was revived in the late 1980s, after a more than three-fold increase in car use over the preceding decade. In 1987, the University of Thessaloniki Transport Engineering Laboratory, under Vasilios Profillidis, published a proposal for an extensive, multi-branch light metro system, envisioned to be underground only between the New Railway Station and Sintrivani, at a cost of ₯28 billion ($587 million today). The city government, under Mayor Sotiris Kouvelas, adopted a modified version of this plan a year later. The line was almost identical to the modern line, with 14 stations between the New Railway Station and Nea Elvetia. The plan had one additional station, Patrikiou, between 25 Martiou and Voulgari and had alternative names for three stations. Dimokratias is shown as Vardari, an alternative name for the public square served by the station; Venizelou is listed as Alkazar (the name of Hamza Bey Mosque when it was converted into a cinema), and Efkleidis is shown as Archaeological Museum. The network would be within the city limits, excluding Kalamaria and a large portion of Thessaloniki's metropolitan area. Of the 7.77 km (4.83 mi) of track proposed, 6.26 km (3.89 mi) would be underground and 1.51 km (0.94 mi) above ground.

=== First attempted construction ===
Route diagram of the 1988 proposal for a 7.8 km (4.8 mi) network (in red), with future extensions in blue

In 1989, construction began on the first 650 metres (2,130 ft) of tunnel along Egnatia street between the Thessaloniki International Fair grounds and Aristotle University of Thessaloniki (the present Panepistimio station), under the slogan Yes to the metro! Yes to quality of life! (Greek: Ναι στο μετρό! Ναι στην ποιότητα ζωής!). Construction was carried out with the cut-and-cover method instead of a tunnel boring machine and was costed at a minimum of ₯120 billion ($2.3 billion today).

The line was designed to be only 2 metres (6.6 ft) below the road surface, but dropped to a minimum depth of 7 metres (23 ft) in the city centre at the insistence of the city's archaeological services. Although construction was scheduled to end in 1995, the project stalled and the unfinished (but excavated) initial cut-and-cover section became known as "the hole of Kouvelas" (Greek: η τρύπα του Κούβελα). The water damage caused to the foundations of the nearby Polytechnic School by the excavation works persists to the present day, with water needing to be mechanically drained daily.

Construction along Egnatia street in 1989, using cut-and-cover.

The project ultimately failed due to funding issues and a lack of interest from the central government. A delegation from the city government received technical support from metro companies in Marseille, Düsseldorf, and West Berlin, as well as assurances from the leadership of the European Economic Community in Brussels that the project would be eligible for Community funding, but the central government blocked the talks and proposed a tram network instead. Kouvelas resigned as mayor in order to become Minister for Public Works in the national government after the 1989 elections, and made Thessaloniki's newly-created municipal radio station, FM 100, responsible for the project's funding via ad revenue. He later admitted being aware it would not be an adequate source of funding, and claimed it was done to force the central government into funding the project. The project also suffered due to intense political polarisation between New Democracy (of which Kouvelas was a member) and the Panhellenic Socialist Movement (PASOK) during the 1980s, with the PASOK-led neighbouring municipalities of Kalamaria and the western suburbs also refusing to support the project, leading to a metro design that ran exclusively within the limits of the New Democracy-dominated Municipality of Thessaloniki (the modern Line 1).

In 1992 the government of Konstantinos Mitsotakis attempted to finance the project under a concession contract with a contractor budget of ₯65 billion ($785 million today). His government lost the 1993 Greek legislative election and a contractor was not appointed; Kouvelas, by then Minister of the Presidency, later claimed this was done in order to avoid impressions of clientelism in the outgoing government. A Greco-Italian consortium named Makedoniko Metro (Greek: Μακεδονικό Μετρό) (Note: The consortium was composed of: Mikhaniki AE (Greece) – 63%; Edi-Stra-Edilizia Stradale SpA (Italy) – 17%; AEG Westinghouse Transport System GmbH (Germany) – 10%; Fidel SpA (Italy) – 5%; Teknocenter-Centro Servizi Administrativi Srl (Italy) – 5%) was tentatively appointed in 1994. A runner-up consortium, headed by Bouygues, was also appointed at that time. Completion was set for 2006, in time for the city to host Expo 2008, but its bid was ultimately unsuccessful. The consortium changed composition numerous times; (Note: In the early stages, before the addition of AEG, the original composition had been: Mikhaniki AE (Greece) – 70%; Edi-Stra-Edilizia Stradale SpA (Italy) – 20%; Fidel SpA (Italy) – 5%; Teknocenter-Centro Servizi Administrativi Srl (Italy) – 5%) (Note: On 29 March 1996 AEG pulled out, a new German company joined, and the three Italian companies formed a consortium, changing the composition to: Mikhaniki AE (Greece) – 80%; ABB Daimler-Benz Transportation Deutschland GmbH (Germany) – 19%; Fidel Group (Italy) – 1%) the three Italian companies went bankrupt, and in the end it was composed of Greek, German, and Belgian stakeholders. (Note: The final composition was: Mikhaniki AE (Greece) – 80.65%; ABB Daimler-Benz Transportation Deutschland GmbH (Germany) – 19.00%; Transurb Consult (Belgium) – 0.35%)

=== Legal troubles ===
1997 funding model
1. State funds (19.0%)
2. ERDF (19.0%)
3. Equity capital (14.0%)
4. Loan capital (48.0%)

Internal reports indicate that the government believed the feasibility study carried out by Makedoniko Metro was unrealistic both in terms of buildability and financing, and so in 1996 the Greek government annulled the appointment and called for the runner-up consortium, Bouygues-led Thessaloniki Metro (Greek: Θεσσαλονίκη Μετρό), (Note: The consortium was composed of: Bouygues (France); Bombardier (Canada/Germany); SNC-Lavalin (Canada); SYSTRA-SOFRETU (France); Via-GTI (France)) (Note: This instance of 'Thessaloniki Metro' is distinct from others in this article. The consortium's name in Greek (Θεσσαλονίκη Μετρό, Thessaloníki Metró) is grammatically unconventional, as it consists of two successive nouns in the nominative case. The name of Thessaloniki's metro system is Greek is Μετρό Θεσσαλονίκης (Metró Thessaloníkis), with Thessaloniki in the genitive case to denote possession, more accurately rendered as 'Metro of Thessaloniki'. In the proceedings of the ECJ, the consortium and the metro system are rendered as 'Thessaloniki Metro' and 'Thessaloniki metro' respectively.) to take on the project. The design was altered to a fully underground system, with 3 km (1.9 mi) in deep tunnels and 6.33 km (3.93 mi) using cut-and-cover, for a total system length of 9.33 km (5.80 mi), 1.56 km (0.97 mi) longer than the previous design. The budget also nearly doubled to ₯220 billion ($1.1 billion today), of which ₯67 billion would be provided directly by the Greek state (jointly through the state budget and the European Regional Development Fund); the EU portion of the funds was conditional on the project being economically viable enough to also attract private funding. A further ₯6 billion would be provided annually to subsidise the agreed ticket price of ₯200 ($1.03 today).

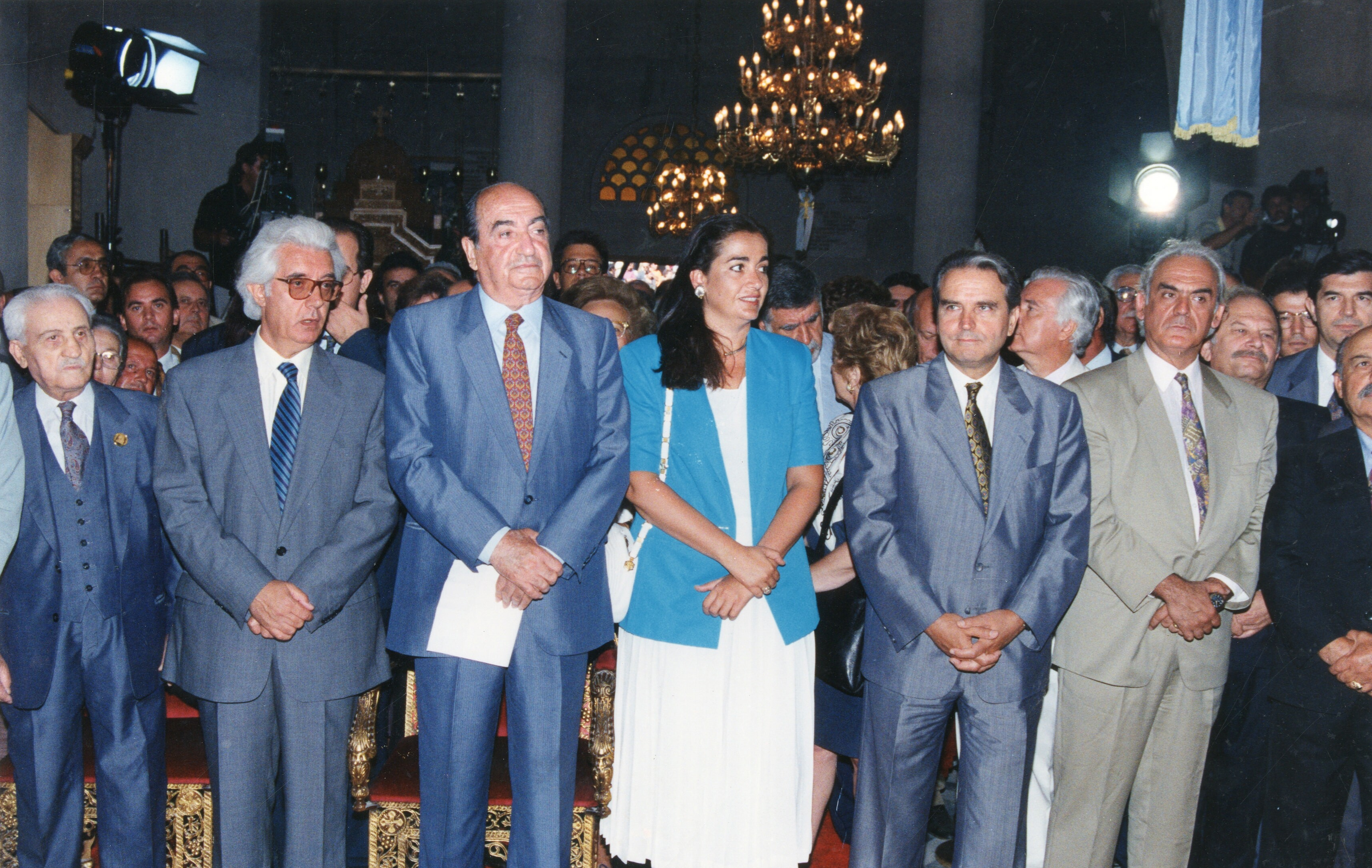
Kouvelas in 1993.

Negotiations were officially terminated on 29 November 1996; the government claimed that companies making up the Makedoniko Metro consortium would not take full responsibility for the construction and operation of the work, that the company had attempted to change the agreed ticket price (to include VAT), and that it would not accept liability for the ₯10 billion in preparatory works. Government memos indicate that the government viewed both its own past actions, as well as those of the Makedoniko Metro management, as "uncouth". Makedoniko Metro challenged the matter at the European Commission, and the project stalled. It eventually sued the Commission for over a billion euros in damages. The European Ombudsman, Jacob Söderman, carried out a two-year investigation into the matter, the most complicated in his office's history, and sided with Makedoniko Metro on the issue of inadequate communication on the part of the Commission, but otherwise rejected its legal arguments.

External videos
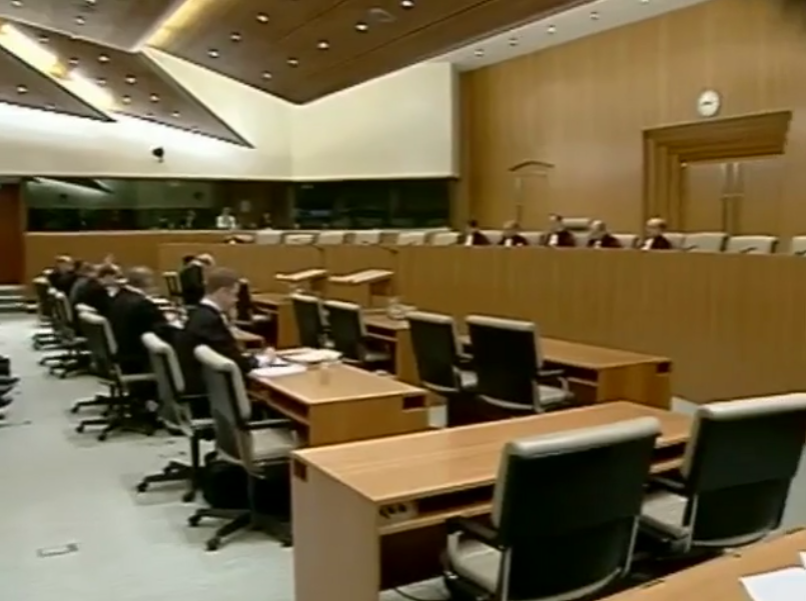
- via the European Commission
- Judgement of the Court of Justice of the European Communities in the case C-57/01 Makedoniko Metro v Elliniko Dimosio

The government of Costas Simitis campaigned for the construction of the metro as one of its national infrastructure priorities in the 2000 election. With the contract commencement deadline approaching in 2002, Thessaloniki mayor Vasilis Papageorgopoulos, along with representatives from 130 city-based organisations, requested an emergency meeting with Prime Minister Simitis as well as the President of Greece, and threatened a mass rally to protest the potential cancellation of the project. A 9-month extension was granted in late 2002 to allow time for the courts to examine the claims of Makedoniko Metro; in January 2003 the European Court of Justice found that the termination of Makedoniko Metro's appointment had been compliant with EU law, while a second ruling a year later found that the Commission had acted lawfully. At the same time, Kouvelas complained at the double standards used for the construction of the Athens Metro, claiming that Thessalonians had spent more of their taxes to subsidise the metro in Athens than it would have cost to build a metro in Thessaloniki. The negative "everything is done in Athens, for Athens" perception resulting from the lack of progress on the metro was acknowledged by internal government briefings. The contract was terminated in 2002 due to a lack of funds associated with the tunnels being deeper than originally planned.

=== Final proposal ===
With the failure of the concession model, in September 2003 the Ministry of the Environment, Urban Planning and Public Works under Vasso Papandreou decided to tender the metro as a public work, co-financed by the Greek government, the European Union's Regional Development Fund, and loans from the European Investment Bank (whose vice-president at the time, Plutarchos Sakellaris, was a Thessaloniki native). Attiko Metro, the state-owned company which oversaw the construction of the Athens Metro, had its articles of association amended to enable it to oversee construction of the Thessaloniki Metro as well. A Greco-Italian consortium (Note: The consortium was composed of: AEGEK (Greece); Impreglio (Italy); Ansaldo S.T.S. (Italy); Seli (Italy); Ansaldo Breda (Italy)) was appointed on 7 April 2006 and construction began in June of the same year. The budget was set to €1.05 billion (€1.6 billion or $1.73 billion today).

In 2018, Elliniko Metro S.A. was overseeing the construction of a two-line, twin-tunnel system composed of Line 1 (the base project) and Line 2 (the Kalamaria Extension). Although Line 1 has been delayed by extensive archaeological works, Line 2's construction is proceeding on schedule. Construction of tunnels for both lines was finished in 2018, and track-laying began in August of that year. Line 1 and Line 2 were expected to be operational by December 2023. Both lines are designed to serve a minimum of 18,000 passengers per hour in each direction, with a 90-second headway. The completed metro will reduce Thessaloniki's greenhouse gas emissions by an estimated 5,000 tons a year, and reduce travel time by up to 66 percent.

== Construction ==
=== Line 1 (Base Project) ===
Topographic map of Line 1

What is known as the Base Project (Greek: Βασικό Έργο) began in 2003, when Attiko Metro and the Greek government agreed to cooperate on a public works project. Government support was instrumental, since lack of government support for the 1988 proposal was the primary reason it had failed. The project issued a request for tender in 2004–2005, and the successful Greco-Italian consortium (which included AnsaldoBreda) began construction in late June 2006. An alternate consortium, Macedonian Metro (Greek: Μακεδονικό Μετρό), was barred by the European Court of Justice from participating in the tender because it changed its composition after the tender proceedings began (violating EU law).

The project was budgeted at €1.05 billion ($1.19 billion), with 25 percent funding from the Greek government and 75 percent funded by loans from the European Investment Bank and the European Regional Development Fund. The latest available Attiko Metro financial data put the official estimated cost at €1.28 billion ($1.45 billion). An April 2019 update raised the estimated cost to €1.62 billion ($1.83 billion). Line 1 runs within the municipality of Thessaloniki, the core of the Thessaloniki urban area, calling at 13 stations.

It has two parallel single-track tunnels on a 9.5 km (5.9 mi) route between New Railway Station (for the city's main railway station) and Nea Elvetia, with Pylaia depot further southeast. Although construction began in 2006, major archaeological finds in the city centre delayed the project considerably. Disputes between Attiko Metro, the city council and archaeologists reached Greece's Council of State, the country's highest administrative court, in 2015. The original schedule had Line 1 operational by 2012. Attiko Metro redesigned several stations in a solution which became known as "antiquities and metro" (Greek: και αρχαία και μετρό). Today, many antiquities discovered due to the construction of the line are on display at permanent in-station exhibitions, while the major discoveries can be found at station Venizelou. These make up the world's first publicly-accessible open-air archaeological site contained in situ within a metro station.

Construction of the tunnels was completed on 31 July 2018, 12 years and one month after breaking ground. That day, the architectural work on Line 1 was reported as 80 percent finished. In August 2018 installation of the tracks and electronic signalling equipment began. It was expected that the line would enter service in its entirety, between New Railway Station and Nea Elvetia in 2020 but will not stop at Agias Sofias and Venizelou, which were planned to open at a later date. By February 2019 construction on the main line was 95 percent completed and platform screen doors were beginning to be installed, while the Supreme Council for Civil Personnel Selection was planning a competition to fill the first 28 Thessaloniki Metro employee positions.

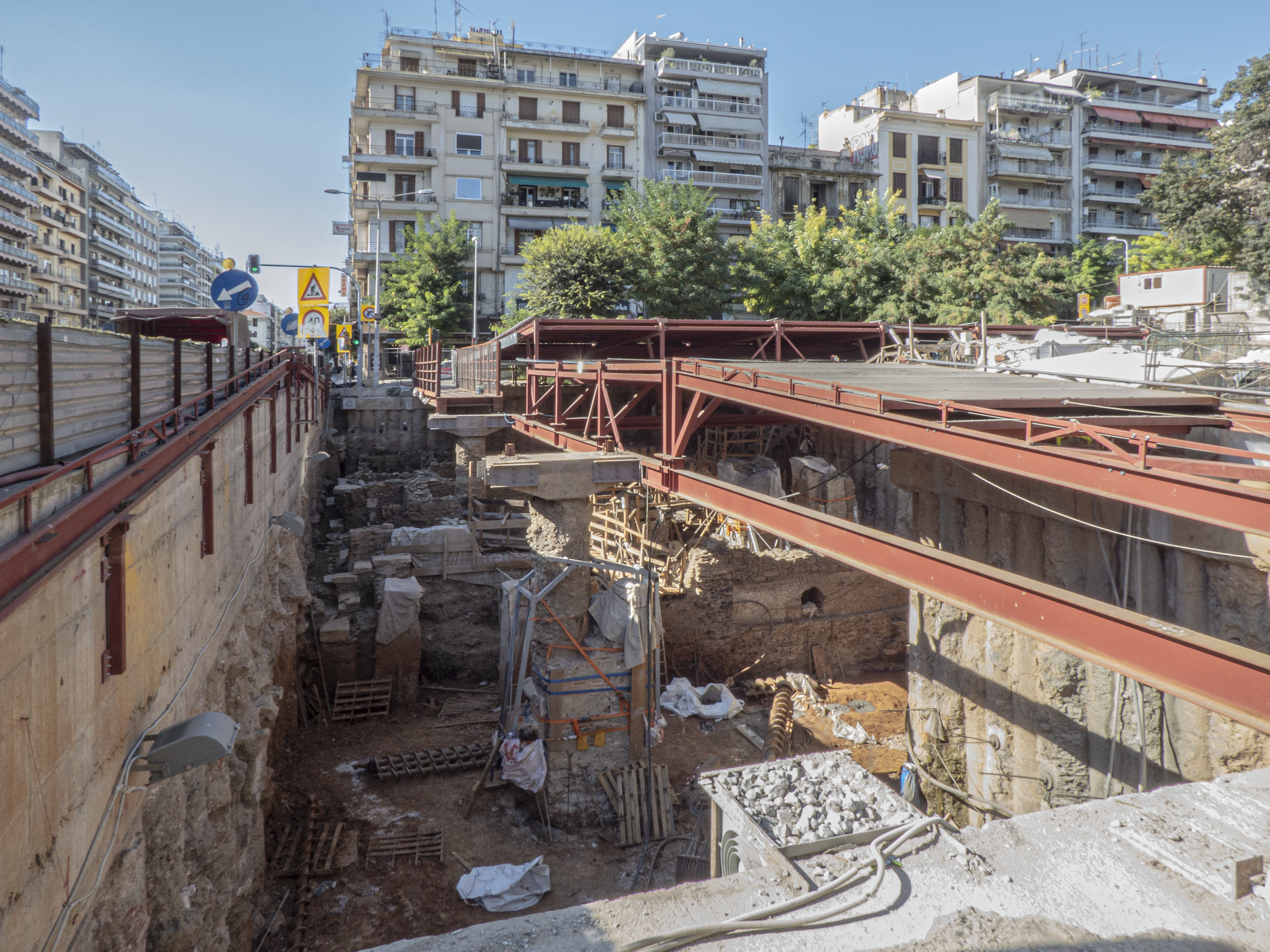
Archaeological excavations at the construction site of Agias Sofias station in September 2018.

Despite the progress, in September 2019 Greece's new conservative cabinet announced a further 28-month delay to the project, pushing the opening date from November 2020 to April 2023 and citing costly archaeological works at Venizelou as the reason. The new Minister of Infrastructure and Transport announced that the government had decided to scrap the previous plan to keep the archaeological discoveries in situ within the station at Venizelou, choosing instead to disassemble them and re-assemble them at a later stage, noting that excavation costs had exceeded €130 million ($146.86 million), more than the cost of the new Acropolis Museum. Thessaloniki's new conservative mayor, Konstantinos Zervas, as well as Prime Minister Kyriakos Mitsotakis, supported this move. Mitsotakis also announced at the Thessaloniki International Fair that a new archaeological museum would be built specifically to house archaeological artefacts unearthed during the construction of the metro. The new head of Attiko Metro (now Elliniko Metro) accused archaeologists of "looking to the past; we need to look forward". There were two more delays, one from April 2023 to December 2023, and one from December 2023 to March 2024.

The decision to disassemble the archaeological finds, dubbed a "Byzantine Pompeii", was strongly criticised, and a citizens' group has taken the government to court over the issue for a second time, supported by former mayor Yiannis Boutaris among others. Part of the objection has to do with the fact that the government has not carried out any studies as to how it will return and re-assemble the artefacts once the station has been built; this course of action was adopted for the construction of Agias Sofias metro station, where the archaeological discoveries were more significant than those at Venizelou, but the re-assembly of the artefacts on site is now impossible because Elliniko metro never constructed any space dedicated to the re-assembly of the artefacts it disassembled, despite having promised to do so. In April 2020, the International Association of Byzantine Studies (AIEB) wrote to Prime Minister Mitsotakis to protest the removal of the antiquities from their original location, saying that the discoveries constituted "a cultural and scientific jewel" and that "it would be a tragedy to jeopardise [Greece's reputation for monument preservation] by squandering the treasure of the Thessaloniki material and data through an unnecessarily hasty construction project", arguing that the previous decision to leave the discoveries in-situ was preferable.

In a customer satisfaction survey carried out by the Aristotle University of Thessaloniki in the months prior to the inauguration of the metro, the only such survey to be published in a peer reviewed journal, 85% of respondents viewed the construction of the metro positively, but also showed overwhelming support for the notions that poor planning and inefficient management of funds were a cause of the years-long construction delays. It also found low levels of satisfaction with the progress of the works, with only 2.8% saying they were fully or quite satisfied with progress, and 42% being moderately satisfied; overall dissatisfaction was at 68%. A different study found that, even though there was widespread dissatisfaction with the construction works and associated years-long traffic arrangements, as well as the closure of businesses that resulted from these, there was also a high degree of understanding of and support for the city's transit-oriented development model.

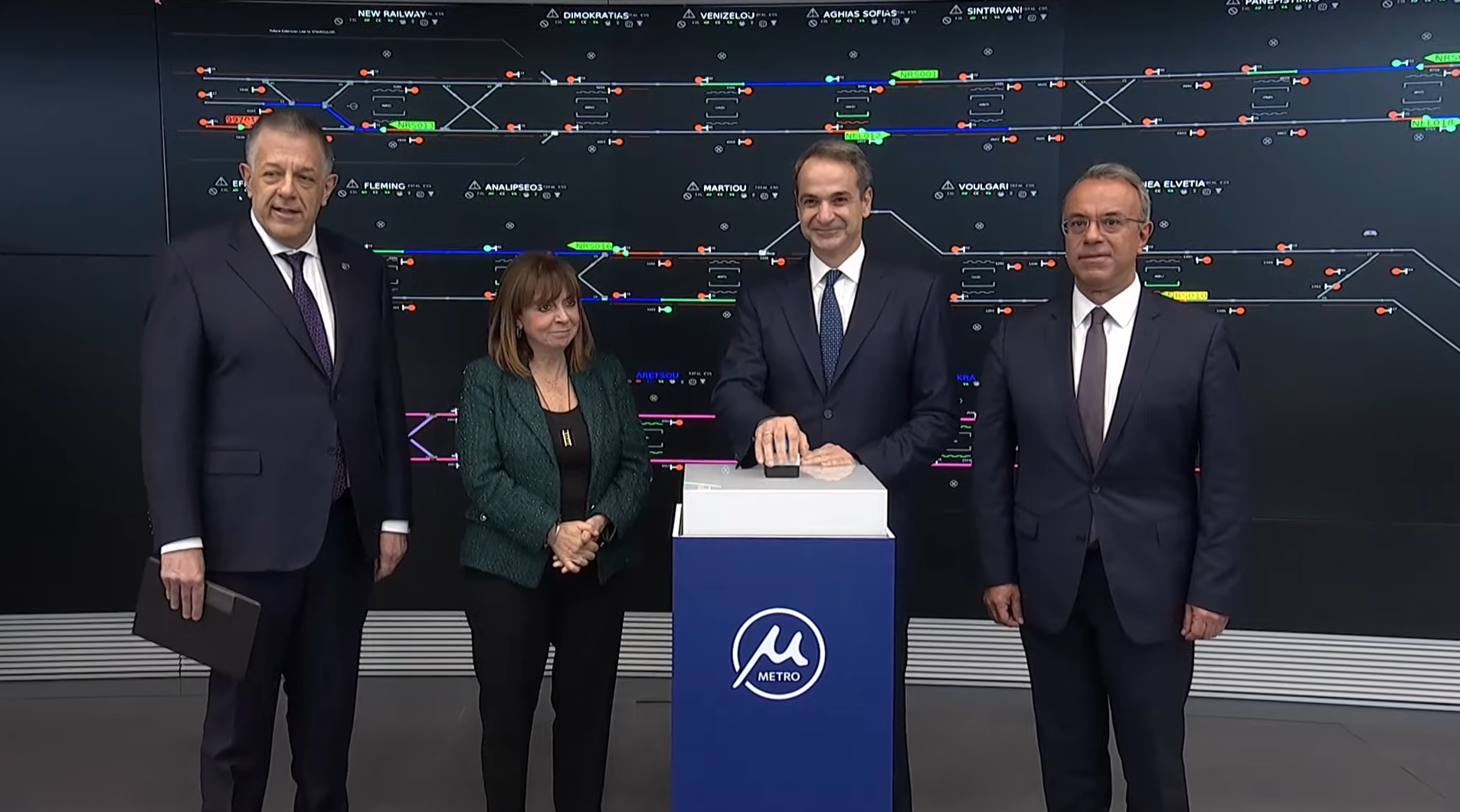
Prime Minister Kyriakos Mitsotakis inaugurates the metro system in the presence of President Katerina Sakellaropoulou.

A final opening date for Line 1 was set for noon on 30 November 2024. In preparation for this, a brand identity was unveiled on 13 November 2024, while the final project cost of €3 billion ($3.24 billion), including €600 million ($649 million) in future interest payments, was revealed on 20 November 2024. The line was finally opened on 30 November in a ceremony officiated by Prime Minister Kyriakos Mitsotakis, with no fares to be collected until 4 December, although the cultural and commercial celebrations organised by the Thessaloniki Chamber of Handicrafts were postponed to 4 December due to Storm Bora. The heavy rainfall also caused minor problems on the line, with water leakage in 3 stations and the elevators in 7 stations being out of use. Nevertheless, use of the metro in the first few days of fare-free operation was high, with employees needing to deploy crowd control measures to prevent platform overcrowding. The first month of operation resulted in a monthly ridership of one million, a 15% decrease in road traffic, and a simultaneous 30% increase in market traffic for businesses in the city centre (some of whom were affected by decreased footfall when construction was ongoing).

=== Line 2 (Kalamaria Extension) ===
Line 2 of the Thessaloniki metro, also known as Kalamaria Extension (Greek: Επέκταση Καλαμαριάς) extends the metro system to Kalamaria, the second-largest municipality in the Thessaloniki urban area and the 18th-most-populous in Greece. Similar in construction to Line 1, it has two parallel single-track tunnels on a 4.78 km (2.97 mi) route between 25 Martiou and Mikra and adds five stations to the network. Construction on the project began in 2013, with a budget of €518 million ($585.18 million). By 31 July 2018, the extension was 60 percent completed. Despite construction starting seven years after Line 1, the extension became operational on 27 August 2026, bringing the total number of stations to 18. This was due to the lack of major archaeological works, which enabled the project to proceed without major delays. The latest Elliniko Metro financial statement puts the extension's cost at €568 million.

After confusion about the extension's place in the system, Elliniko Metro clarified in August 2018 that it would be a separate line running between New Railway Station and Mikra without the need to change trains at 25 Martiou. The extension of Line 2 to Makedonia Airport went to tender in March 2019 with an initial budget of €254,150 ($287,000) for topographical works in order to enable more detailed planning of the line.

== Future ==
The extension to the northwestern districts initially included a circular line and was in a preliminary phase until the fall of 2023 when the management of Elliniko Metro S.A. decided not to proceed with the project, considering it both structurally unfeasible and wrong in design. The project now includes a northwest extension of Line 1 that will start from Dimokratias, will cross Stavroupoli and Evosmos, will reach the hospitals at the northwestern entrance of the city, and will end at a second depot of Line 1 situated at the ring road of Thessaloniki. The relevant decisions were announced by Hellenic Metro S.A. on 20 May 2024. The funding process was to begin in 2024. The Greek government will seek to fund the extension via the European Regional Development Fund for the 2028–2032 cycle.

The contractor's audit procedures will follow, along with the approval by the Court of Audit and the signing of the contract with the contractor. The northwestern extension will be a priority among all future extensions of the Thessaloniki Metro and will include the following stations:

- Dimokratias (existing station)
- Neapoli (Roumanikon Park, Neapoli)
- Terpsithea
- Stavroupoli (Lagada and Lykourgou, Thessaloniki Psychiatric Hospital)
- Polichni (former name Agia Varvara, Davaki Street, S.O.A., Paul Mela Camp or with alternative positioning of Lagadas and Davakis)
- Efkarpia
- Papageorgiou Hospital

The tender for the northwestern extension is expected to be completed by 2027.

=== Line 2 (extension to Makedonia Airport) ===
Topographic works, geological and geotechnical studies are currently being tendered for the project. This extension will start from Mikra and will continue to the south, with an underground part from Mikra to ASP (Higher School of War), an overground part to Georgikis Scholi Avenue and another overground part from IKEA to the airport. The overground parts of the line will probably stand at a height of 5 meters and on a bridge in order to avoid further delays due to possible archaeological finds.

The stations of the extension will be:

- Higher School of War (old name Marinou Antipa, on Georgikis School Street), near Vrochidis and PAOK Sports Arena
- Patriarchiko (near Mediterranean Cosmos Mall)
- Interbalkan Medical Center (former names IKEA, "Green Lanterns" and "Shopping Centers", at the junction of Agricultural School and Asklipio, new stadium Aris, OASTH bus station)
- Agricultural School (old names of the station Agricultural School, Agricultural School and Kombos Thermi, Green Traffic Lights, junction of G. School and EO Thes/kis-Polygyrou)
- Makedonia Airport
- Center for Innovation & Technology

=== Line 2 (extension to Thermi) ===
Line 2 will be extended further to Thermi from Patriarchiko, with only one station currently planned.

- Thermi

=== Line 3 (Ano Evosmos – Harilaou/Pylaia) ===
On 20 May 2024, projected Line 3 was officially announced, as connection of the western with the northeastern districts of the city has been deemed necessary. Line 3 will run under Tsimiski avenue and parallel to Line 1, which will eventually meet at University station. However, from that station, it will head northeast.

The stations of Line 3 will be:

- Ano Evosmos
- Perifereiaki
- Evosmos
- Menemeni
- Ampelokipi
- New Railway Station (adjacent station with Line 1)
- Dimokratias (adjacent station with Line 1)
- Aristotelous Square
- H.A.N.Th.
- Panepistimio (adjacent station with Line 1)
- Agios Dimitrios
- Toumba
- Charilaou
- Agia Kyriaki

Line 3 is further projected to include extensions to KTEL Macedonia and Kordelio. Breaking from the Ampelokipi station, this extension will include the following stations:

- Ampelokipi
- KTEL Macedonia
- Eptanisou
- Kordelio

== Operations ==
The first Thessaloniki Metro driverless train departing the depot for its trials, in September 2020.

In 2023 Azienda Trasporti Milanesi and Egis Group were awarded a €250 million ($286 million) contract to operate the system under the operating company Thessaloniki Metro Automatic (THEMA) for 11 years, with a share of 51% and 49% respectively.

=== Automation ===
The Thessaloniki Metro is of GoA4 category, the first of its kind in Greece: starting, stopping, and the operation of doors is fully automated.

=== Stations, depot and rolling stock ===
All stations were designed with platform screen doors for maximum protection, while the trains are driverless. 33 Hitachi Rail Italy Driverless Metro units are in service on Line 1 and Line 2. The articulated, four-car trains are 50 metres (160 ft) long. They have seating for 96 passengers and standing room for 370 more. The trains use 750 V DC third rail electrification, while tracks have been laid to the standard gauge of 1,435 mm (4 ft 8 1/2 in). A carriage was on display at the September 2018 Thessaloniki International Fair before trial runs in 2019. As of August 2019 two complete train sets have been delivered to the depot, with an additional train set expected every 2 to 3 months. The system's level of automation has prompted Attiko Metro to call it "the most modern metro in Europe".

A 50,000 m^{2} (540,000 sq ft) depot was constructed with the intention of serving both lines, with a total built-up area of 120,000 m^{2} (1,300,000 sq ft) and a total cost of €130.5 million ($147.43 million). Apart from being the system's automated remote control command centre, the complex also houses the offices of Elliniko Metro, the Thessaloniki Transport Authority (TheTA), and the Thessaloniki Metro operating company, as well as railway stock maintenance facilities, two restaurants, and a crèche. It is expected that the development of the depot will attract investment to the area, and there have been calls to make provisions for a passenger station at the depot. The depot complex is expected to be finished in May 2019.

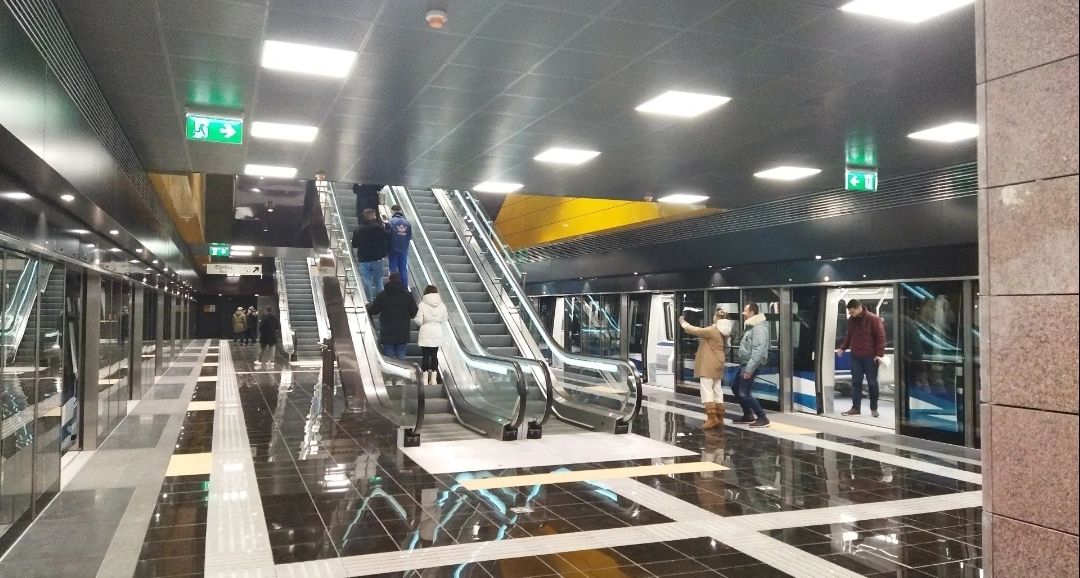
Thessaloniki Metro stations are equipped with platform screen doors on island platforms.

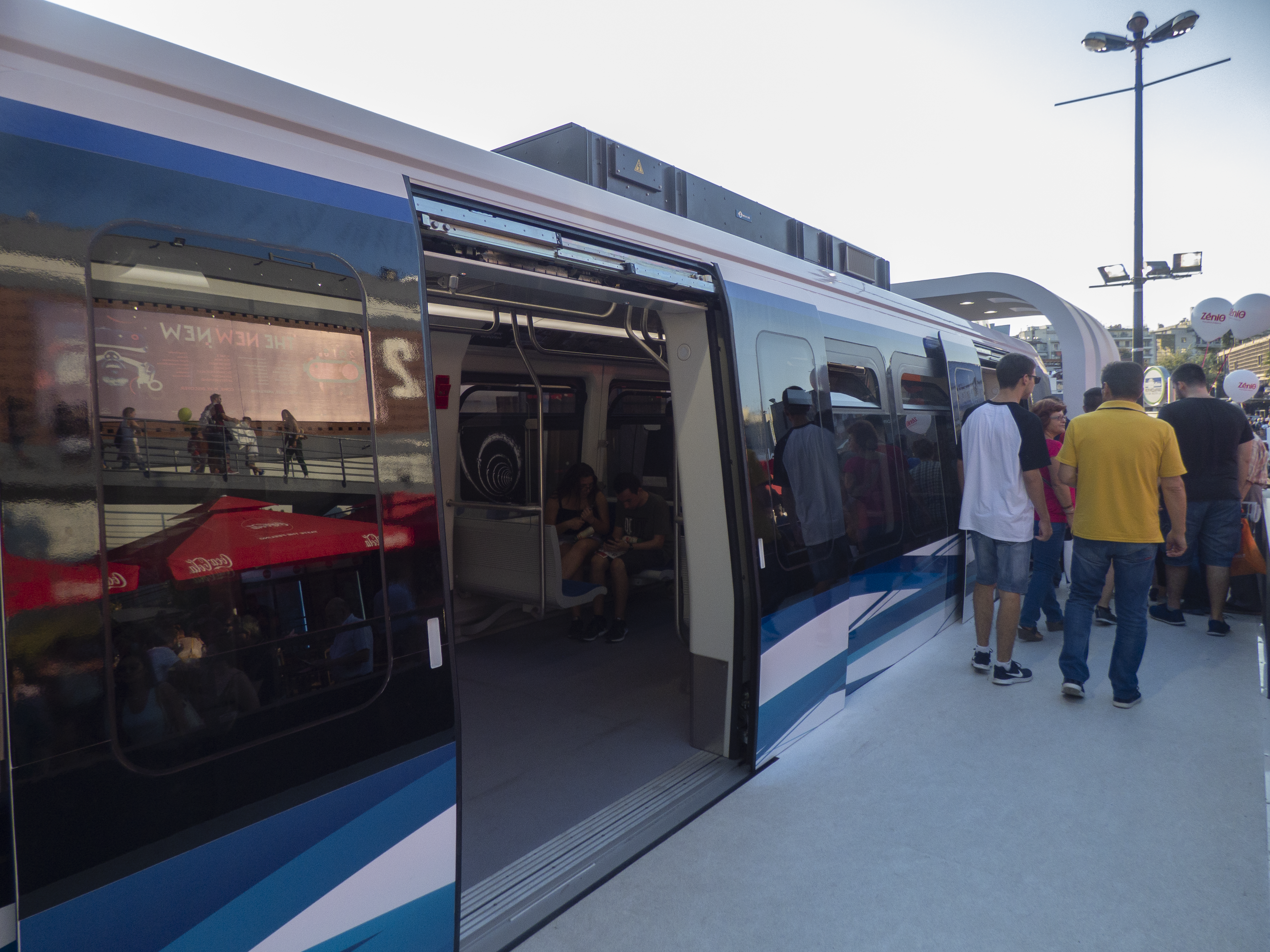
Thessaloniki Metro Hitachi Rail Italy Driverless Metro carriage at the September 2018 Thessaloniki International Fair

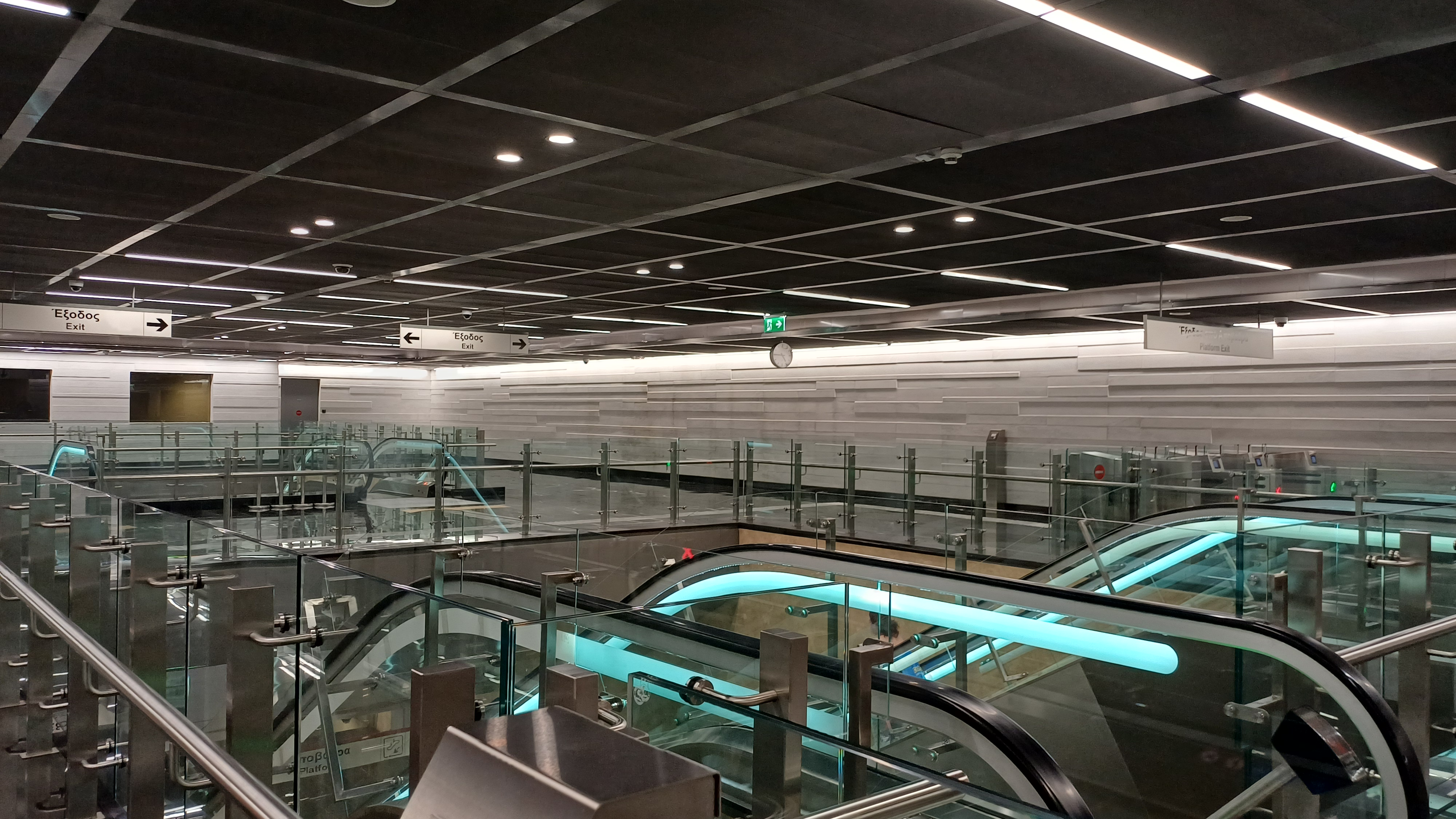
Venizelou Station

=== Fares and park and ride ===
Thessaloniki Metro fares
	Basic	Reduced
single trip	€0.60	€0.30
24 hours	€2.50	n/a
30 days	€16.00	€8.00
90 days	€45.00	€22.50
180 days	€85.00	€42.50
10+1	€5.80	€2.90
Front face of a ThessCard

As part of the initial design, 3,700 park and ride parking spaces were created – 1,050 spaces at New Railway Station, 650 spaces Nea Elvetia, and a further 2,000 at Panepistimio, the system's halfway point serving Greece's largest university. Additional parking will be created at Mikra, the terminus of Line 2.

Elliniko Metro conducted a 2005 survey to determine Thessaloniki residents' preferred fare for the metro compared to the standard price of a Thessaloniki Urban Transport Organization (OASTH) bus ticket (€0.50 at the time). Of the 400 respondents, 47.6 percent said that they were willing to pay the same price and 48.1 percent said they would pay more. Of the latter, 19.9 percent said that they would pay €0.60; 19.6 percent would pay €0.70, and 8.6 percent would be willing to pay €1.00 (double the cost of a bus ticket). The remaining 4.7 percent responded with another fare. A standard 2023 single-trip OASTH bus ticket is €0.90, or €0.45 with a discount.

Thessaloniki Metro utilises an electronic card ticketing system as well as fare gates, a system not originally implemented on the Athens Metro. In October 2024 it was reported that there was concern the ticketing system might not be ready on time for the opening on 30 November, due to the Thessaloniki Transport Authority not initiating the procurement process on time. The company attempted to bypass procurement requirements claiming extraordinary circumstances but the Court of Audit ruled this illegal, saying that the opening date of the metro was not an extraordinary circumstance, and that the size of the order (2.7 million paper tickets and 100,000 plastic cards) necessitated a public invitation to tender.

In November 2024 it was announced that a typical ticket will cost €0.90, but the cost will be reduced to €0.60 for the first six months of the system's operations. A monthly ticket will cost €16, compared to €27 for a monthly bus pass for the city's bus network. This makes Thessaloniki Metro one of the most affordable means of public transport in Europe and the world according to data compiled by Compare the Market Australia, and the cheapest among major cities in the Greek-speaking world.

=== Brand identity ===
Variations of the letter μ in Greek manuscripts

The system logo

In preparation for the start of operations on 30 November 2024, Minister of Infrastructure and Transport Christos Staikouras revealed the system's brand identity. The central design element is lowercase Greek letter M (μ), in the Greek minuscule style used to write Medieval Greek manuscripts, in reference to the city's Byzantine history. Dark blue was chosen as the main brand colour, to symbolise stability. The SIL Open Font Commissioner was chosen for the word 'metro' in the logo, and for promotional materials and signage.

The logo attracted criticism both for its cost and its aesthetics, the latter particularly on social media due to its simplicity. Elliniko Metro initiated two design competitions, with an initial prize of €8,000 ($8,650), but both were cancelled and the contract was instead awarded directly to a company for €30,000 ($32,438). The company retorted that the second competition was cancelled due to not being satisfied with the bids received (8 in total), eventually deciding to award the €30,000 prize money to a company directly in order for the visual identity to be ready on time, while the Architects' Association of Thessaloniki accused the company of deliberately orchestrating the situation in order to give the contract to an "obscure start-up which did not even have a website at the time of its appointment", a situation it described as "a sham process - at the expense of fellow architects and other related professionals (graphic designers, artists) and ultimately the local community" as part of a "long list of direct appointments". The spokesman of the Government of Greece described concerns around the brand's aesthetics as "legitimate", but otherwise defended both the design and the companies involved.

In an examination of the metadata on the official branding presentation document published by Elliniko Metro, carried out by +Design Magazine, it was revealed that the document was not originally created by MnMS, the company that Elliniko Metro directly appointed to design the logo, but rather by Palladian, one of the companies which has submitted bids in the competition. The two companies were previously based in the same building in Athens, raising further questions. Elliniko Metro amended the metadata five hours after the official unveiling of the logo, changing among others the name of the author, but had already disseminated the unaltered presentation to media outlets such as Naftemporiki.

The use of colours on the metro lines is inconsistent; in-station maps and platform signage shows Line 1 as red and Line 2 as blue, in line with the brand guidelines, but the official Thessaloniki Metro website shows them as blue and yellow respectively.

== Archaeology ==
The Thessaloniki Metro line (marked in yellow) runs through the city's historic centre below its Decumanus Maximus.

A large number of important archaeological finds, primarily Roman and early Christian and Byzantine, have been discovered during the metro's construction. The project triggered the largest archaeological dig in northern Greek history, covering a 20-square-kilometre (7.7 sq mi) area. Between the new railway station and Sintrivani/Ekthesi, the metro runs below Egnatia Street (one of Thessaloniki's main arteries). Egnatia follows the Roman Via Egnatia, which connected Rome and Constantinople as one of the two most important roads in the Roman and Byzantine empires. The portion of the Via Egnatia which passed through Thessaloniki was the city's Decumanus Maximus (main road), and runs below present-day Egnatia Street at 5.4 metres (18 ft) below ground level.

Although the location of the Via Egnatia in Thessaloniki was known when the metro line was planned, it was uncertain what else was buried nearby. The metro was planned to run at 8 metres (26 ft) below ground, leaving only 2.6 metres (8.5 ft) between it and the ancient road. The discovery of a Byzantine road at Venizelou station was a major archaeological find: 75 metres (246 ft) of the marble-paved and column-lined road was unearthed, with shops, other buildings, and plumbing which one scholar called "the Byzantine Pompeii". A crossroads, marked with a tetrapylon, was found at Venizelou where the Decumanus Maximus crossed a cardo (a north–south road). An additional 22 metres (72 ft) of the same road was discovered at the Agias Sofias station. Issues concerning archaeological finds and the display of artefacts in the metro system are more complex than similar issues surrounding the construction of the New Acropolis Museum.

Other important discoveries included a headless statue of Aphrodite, fourth-century-AD mosaics, a golden wreath, a bath complex, urban villas, and 50,000 coins. Artifacts from the 1917 fire were also found.

The discovery sparked controversy in Thessaloniki; Attiko Metro wanted to remove the antiquities and re-assemble them elsewhere, and the city's archaeological services wanted the company to alter the depth of the line and the station entrances. The city council sided with the archaeological services in 2015, three years after the metro was originally planned to begin service. Mayor Yiannis Boutaris took the case to the Council of State, Greece's highest administrative court. Attiko Metro redesigned the line, sinking the tunnels to depths from 14 to 31 metres (46 to 102 ft) and providing for mini-museums in the stations similar to the Syntagma metro station in Athens (which houses the Syntagma Metro Station Archaeological Collection). The Venizelou station will contain an open archaeological site, the world's first metro station to do so.

Archaeological costs had increased to €188.5 million ($204 million) by 2023, compared with the original archaeological budget of €15 million ($17 million), and employ 300 archaeologists. Over 300,000 artefacts have been unearthed to date. The archaeological work is being carried out by the Ministry of Culture and Sports' Ephorate of Prehistoric and Classical Antiquities and the Ephorate of Byzantine Antiquities.

== Incidents ==
- 14 December 2024 – A Hitachi Rail Italy Driverless Metro unit lost power shortly after departing Fleming station, and passengers had to escape through the tunnel to the nearest station. Operation returned to normal about 90 minutes later. There were no injuries, but the Thessaloniki Prosecutor's Office ordered a criminal investigation to determine whether the relevant safety protocols (particularly as they relate to people with mobility issues) were followed.

== In popular culture ==
In the past, Thessaloniki Metro was regularly the subject of a number of jokes in Greece due to its successive construction and operation delays. News satire websites joked about the situation on numerous occasions with stories such as "Thessaloniki Metro will operate as a Christmas village during the holiday season" and "Strike at the Thessaloniki Metro continues for the 763rd day". It has also been likened to the folk tale of the never-ending construction of the bridge of Arta.

A fictionalised version of Sintrivani station (under the older name of Sintrivani/Ekthesi) was depicted in the film The Bricklayer, which was set in Thessaloniki, prior to the metro system becoming operational; this drew laughter from cinema audiences in the city.

After operation of the metro system began on 30 November 2024, public focus shifted towards its proper use and maintenance.

== See also ==
- List of metro systems
- Thessaloniki Urban Transport Organization
- Athens Metro
