= Thessaloniki Urban Transport Organization =

Mass transport company in Thessaloniki, Greece

Thessaloniki Urban Transport Organisation Οργανισμός Αστικών Συγκοινωνιών Θεσσαλονίκης
- Founded: 6 August 1957
- Headquarters: Al. Papanastasiou 90, 54644Thessaloniki, Greece
- Service area: Thessaloniki metropolitan area
- Service type: Bus transport network
- Alliance: KTEL Thessalonikis, KTEL Serres, KTEL Chalkidikis
- Routes: 267 (2 night routes)
- Hubs: 2
- Stations: 5
- Fleet: 360 vehicles
- Fuel type: Diesel
- Operator: Greek Government
- President: Taggiris Kostas
- Website: www.oasth.gr

The Thessaloniki Urban Transport Organisation (Greek: Οργανισμός Αστικών Συγκοινωνιών Θεσσαλονίκης, romanized: Organismós Astikṓn Sygkoinōniṓn Thessaloníkīs), abbreviated OASTH (Greek: ΟΑΣΘ), is a mass transport company operating in Thessaloniki, Greece.

It was founded in 1957 and now covers a large area of the metropolitan area of Thessaloniki, the country's second-largest city. OASTH only includes bus transportation due to lack of other means of transport.

== History ==
Before the creation of OASTH in 1957, public transport in Thessaloniki was initially covered by an extensive tram network opened in the late 19th century. Later a Belgian bus company started operating with horse-pulled carriages seating 4 to 5 people. OASTH was founded by Presidential Decree 3721 and aimed at replacing the city's tram network as sole provider of public transport. The initial fleet included 283 buses of 60 to 80 seats.

In 1978, OASTH acquired the first articulated buses in Greece. In 1979 OASTH expands, taking over several routes previously operated by KTEL in the suburbs of Thessaloniki and also takes over the sea services operating by small boats during summer months and are replaced by new OASTH bus routes.

In 2003 OASTH expanded again and 12 new lines were created for the suburbs of Thessaloniki. In 2009 64 new buses were added to the fleet, numbering 604 buses in total. The agreement with the Greek state regarding the right to monopolise public transport in Thessaloniki is valid until two years after the completion of the Thessaloniki Metro and its expansions.

The Greek government in 2017, through the passing of a law, proceeded to nationalize the company in 2017, citing as a cause the poor service of the citizens, the corruption and the complaints for embezzlement of public money by the private shareholders.

== Lines in operation ==
Being the sole provider of public transport within the city of Thessaloniki, OASTH operates an extensive network that covers the entire city. Overall 267 routes are currently in service. Several bus stops all over Thessaloniki are equipped with electronic timetables and some with a button for the activation of a talk system for blind people notifying passengers about the arrival of the next bus of every line.

== Vehicles ==
EV Bus, route 38 in Efkarpia

The current fleet of OASTH consists of approximately 360 buses (181 regular, 125 articulated, 31 medium, 5 minibuses, and 2 minibuses specially designed for the transportation of people with disabilities) and consists of the following types of buses:

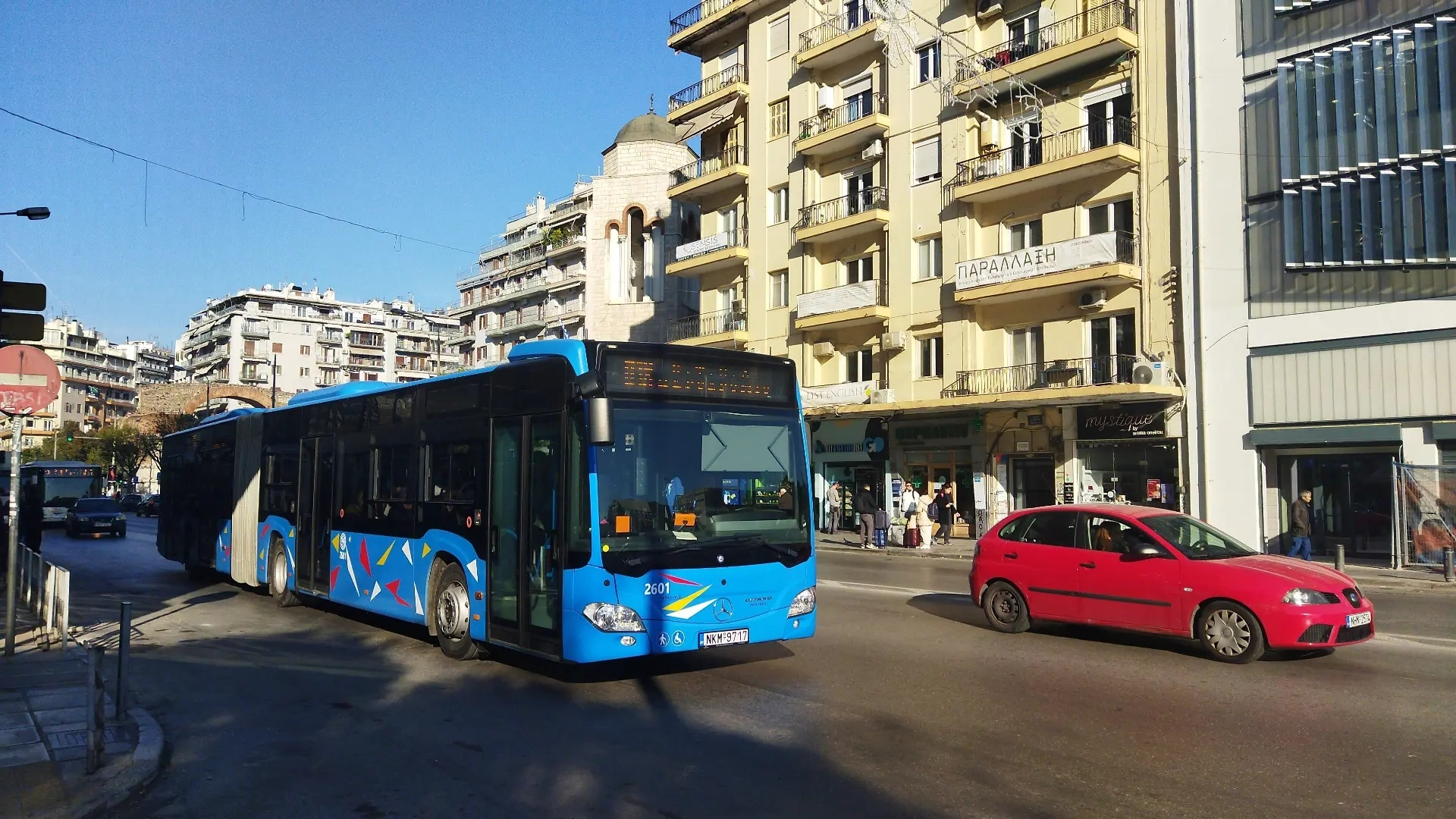
New bus vehicle (C2 G 2013), express route (01X, Intercity Bus Station - Airport

=== Current fleet ===
- 4 x Solaris Urbino 12 (2006-2009) (Municipality of Thessaloniki) (2020) (spare)
- 23 x Mercedes-Benz O530 Citaro Facelift G (2009) (leasing 2020)
- 11 x ELVO C08.B9LA (Volvo B9LA) (2010)
- 9 x ELVO C08.B9L (Volvo B9L) (2010) (spare)
- 16 x Irisbus Citelis 12M (2010, 2011) (spare)
- 27 x Mercedes Benz O530 Citaro C2 (2013) (leasing 2023-2024)
- 33 x Mercedes Benz O530 Citaro C2 G (2013) (leasing 2023-2024)
- 24 x Mercedes-Benz Conecto G (2014) (Papadakis leasing 2025)
- 1 x Mercedes-Benz Sprinter W906 516CDI (2015) (leasing 2025)
- 4 x Integralia In-Urban (Mercedes-Benz Sprinter W906 516CDI) (2017) (leasing 2022)
- 14 x Solaris Urbino III 18,75 (2017) (Papadakis leasing 2025)
- 20 x MAN 18C Lion's City NG330 EfficientHybrid (2020) (Papadakis leasing 2025)
- 15 x Anadolu Isuzu Citiport 12 (2023) (leasing 2025)
- 31 x Temsa MD9 LE (2024-2025) (leasing 2025)
- 110 x Yutong E12 (2024)

=== Former fleet ===
Bus model	Introduction date	Retirement date
Volvo B10M	1993	2021
Scania L113	1995	2021

== See also ==
- Thessaloniki Metro
- Transport in Greece
- Thessaloniki Transport Authority
