= New Railway Station metro station =

Metro station in Thessaloniki, Greece

Νέος Σιδ. Σταθμός New Railway Station
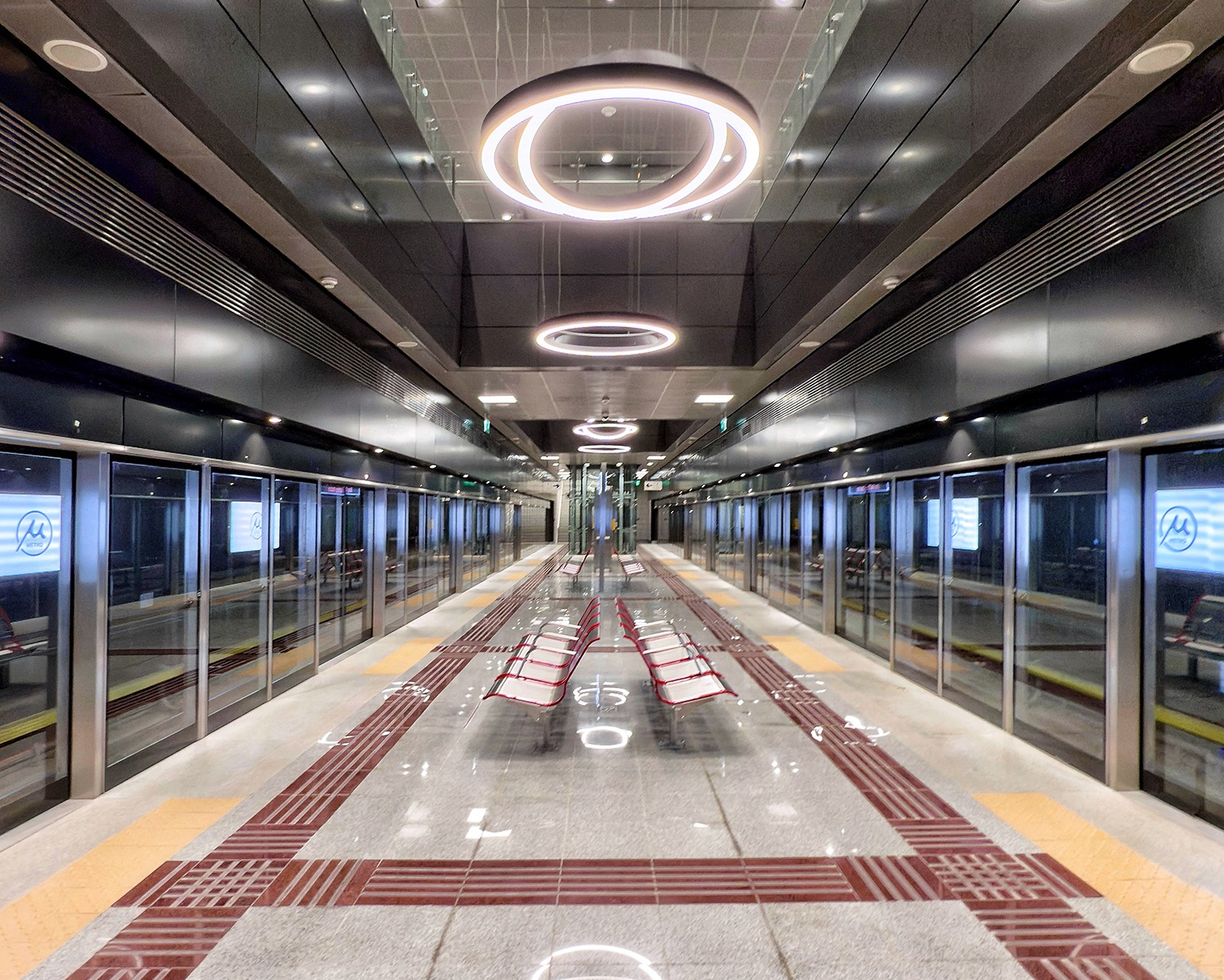

General information
- Location: Thessaloniki railway station Thessaloniki; Greece
- Coordinates: 40°38′37″N 22°55′45″E
- Owner: Elliniko Metro
- Operator: Thessaloniki Metro Automatic S.A. (THEMA)
- Transit authority: TheTA
- Line: Thessaloniki Metro Line 1 Thessaloniki Metro Line 2
- Platforms: 1 (island)
- Tracks: 2
- Connections: Hellenic Train; Regional Rail

Construction
- Structure type: Underground
- Parking: 1050 park and ride spaces
- Accessible: Yes

History
- Opened: 30 November 2024

Services
Preceding station	Thessaloniki Metro	Following station
Terminus	Line 1	Dimokratias towards Nea Elvetia
Terminus	Line 2	Dimokratias towards Mikra
- Track layout
- Schematic only – not to scale.
Location

New Railway Station metro station (Greek: Νέος Σιδηροδρομικός Σταθμός,), abbreviated on signage as Neos Sid. Stathmos (Νέος Σιδ. Σταθμός), is a metro station at the Thessaloniki railway station, serving Thessaloniki Metro's Line 1 and Line 2. It serves as the western terminus of both lines and entered service in 2024. Construction of this station had been held back by major archaeological finds, and it is designated as a mid-importance archaeological site by Elliniko Metro, the company overseeing its construction.

The oldest proposal for a metro station at this location goes back to 1918, when it was proposed as a terminus for a metropolitan railway line essentially running the same route as the current Line 1. Neos Sidirodromikos Stathmos was also the terminus for the 1988 Thessaloniki Metro proposal.

== See also ==
- List of Thessaloniki Metro stations
- Media related to New Railway Station metro station at Wikimedia Commons
