= Nea Elvetia metro station =

Metro station in Thessaloniki, Greece

Νέα Ελβετία Nea Elvetia
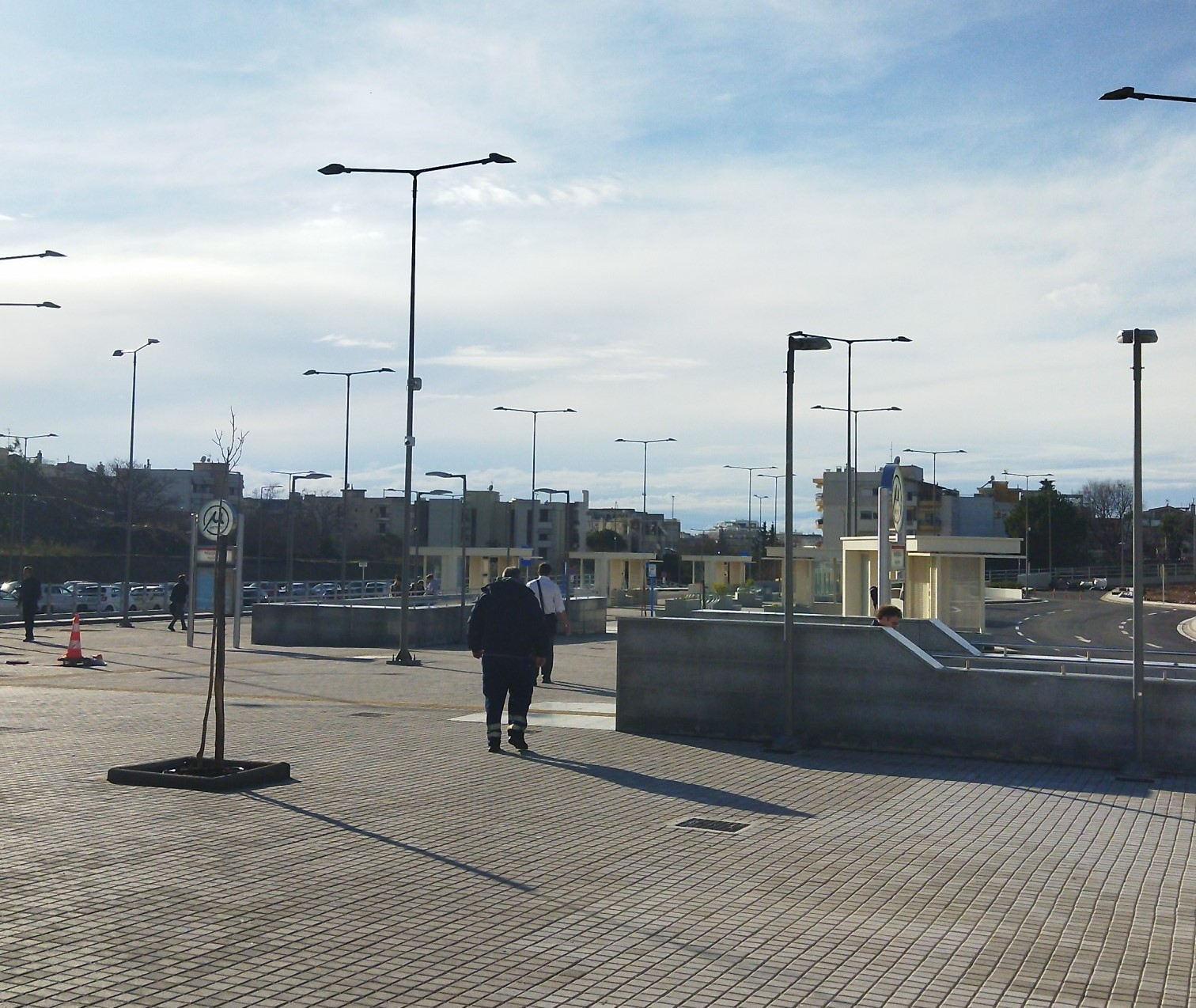
- The terminal station

General information
- Location: Thessaloniki; Greece
- Coordinates: 40°35′35″N 22°58′07″E
- Owner: Elliniko Metro
- Operator: Thessaloniki Metro Automatic S.A. (THEMA)
- Transit authority: TheTA
- Line: Thessaloniki Metro Line 1
- Platforms: 1 (island)
- Tracks: 2

Construction
- Structure type: Underground
- Parking: 650 park and ride spaces
- Accessible: Yes

History
- Opened: 30 November 2024

Services
Preceding station	Thessaloniki Metro	Following station
Voulgari towards New Railway Station	Line 1	Terminus
- Track layout
- Schematic only – not to scale.
Location

Nea Elvetia (Greek: Νέα Ελβετία,, lit. 'New Switzerland') is a metro station serving Thessaloniki Metro's Line 1, named after the Thessaloniki district of Nea Elvetia, in which it is located. It serves as the eastern terminus of the line and entered service in 2024. The Pylaia depot lies east of Nea Elvetia station.

The oldest proposal for a station at this general location goes back to 1918, when it was proposed as a terminus for a Metropolitan Railway line essentially running the same route as the current Line 1. The main difference with the current station is that the 1918 proposal listed an overground station, whereas this station is underground. Nea Elvetia station also appears in the 1988 Thessaloniki Metro proposal.

== See also ==
- List of Thessaloniki Metro stations
- Media related to Nea Elvetia metro station at Wikimedia Commons
