= Mikra metro station =

Metro station in Thessaloniki, Greece

Μίκρα Mikra
- L2 Thessaloniki Metro Mikra Terminal Station

General information
- Location: Thessaloniki; Greece
- Coordinates: 40°34′06″N 22°57′57″E
- Owner: Elliniko Metro
- Operator: Thessaloniki Metro Automatic S.A. (THEMA)
- Transit authority: TheTA
- Line: Thessaloniki Metro Line 2
- Platforms: 1 (island)
- Tracks: 2
- Connections: Shuttle bus to Thessaloniki Airport

Construction
- Structure type: Underground
- Parking: Yes
- Accessible: Yes

History
- Opened: 27 August 2026

Services
Preceding station	Thessaloniki Metro	Following station
Nea Krini towards New Railway Station	Line 2	Terminus
- Track layout
- Schematic only – not to scale.
Location

Mikra (Greek: Μίκρα,) is a metro station serving Thessaloniki Metro's Line 2. It is named after the neighbourhood of Mikra, in which it is located. It serves as the eastern terminus of the line and opened on 27 August 2026.

== See also ==
- List of Thessaloniki Metro stations
