= Egnatia Street, Thessaloniki =

Main commercial street in Thessaloniki. Greece

Coordinates: 40.6333°N 22.9491°E

Egnatia Street
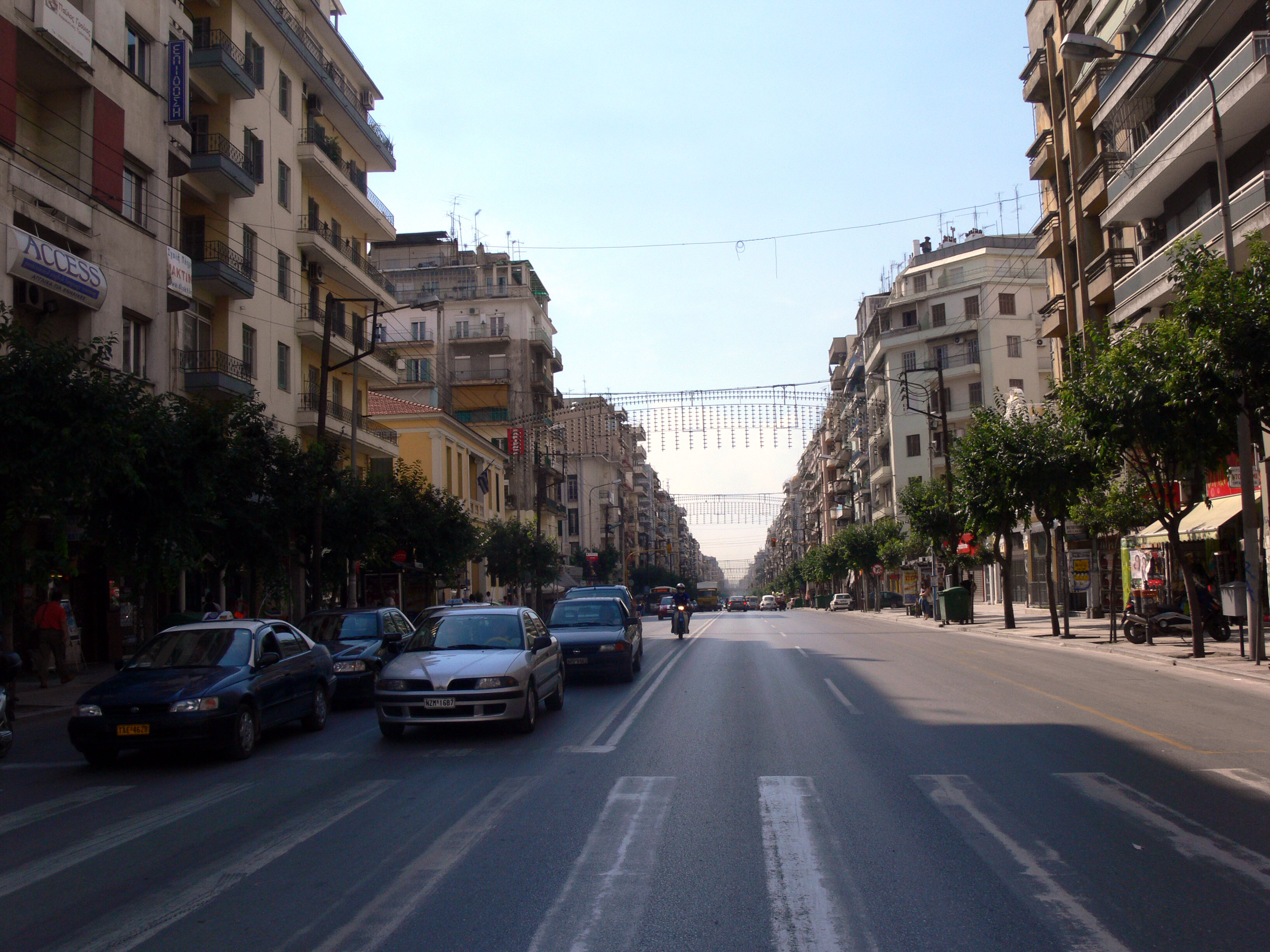
- Egnatia/Iasonidou Junction
- Interactive map of Egnatia Street
- Native name: Οδός Εγνατία (Greek)
- Namesake: Via Egnatia
- Owner: Municipality of Thessaloniki
- Length: 3 km (1.9 mi)
- Location: Thessaloniki, Macedonia, Greece
- From: Demokratias Square (Vardari)
- To: Konstantinou Karamanli (Nea Egnatia)

Egnatia Street (Greek: Οδός Εγνατίας) is the main commercial street in downtown Thessaloniki. The road is named for the Roman-era Via Egnatia which passed near the city. Lined with shops and office buildings, it is one of the busiest streets of Thessaloniki, and is part of the Nea Diagonios road corridor between the city centre and the neighbourhood of Foinikas.

== Gallery ==
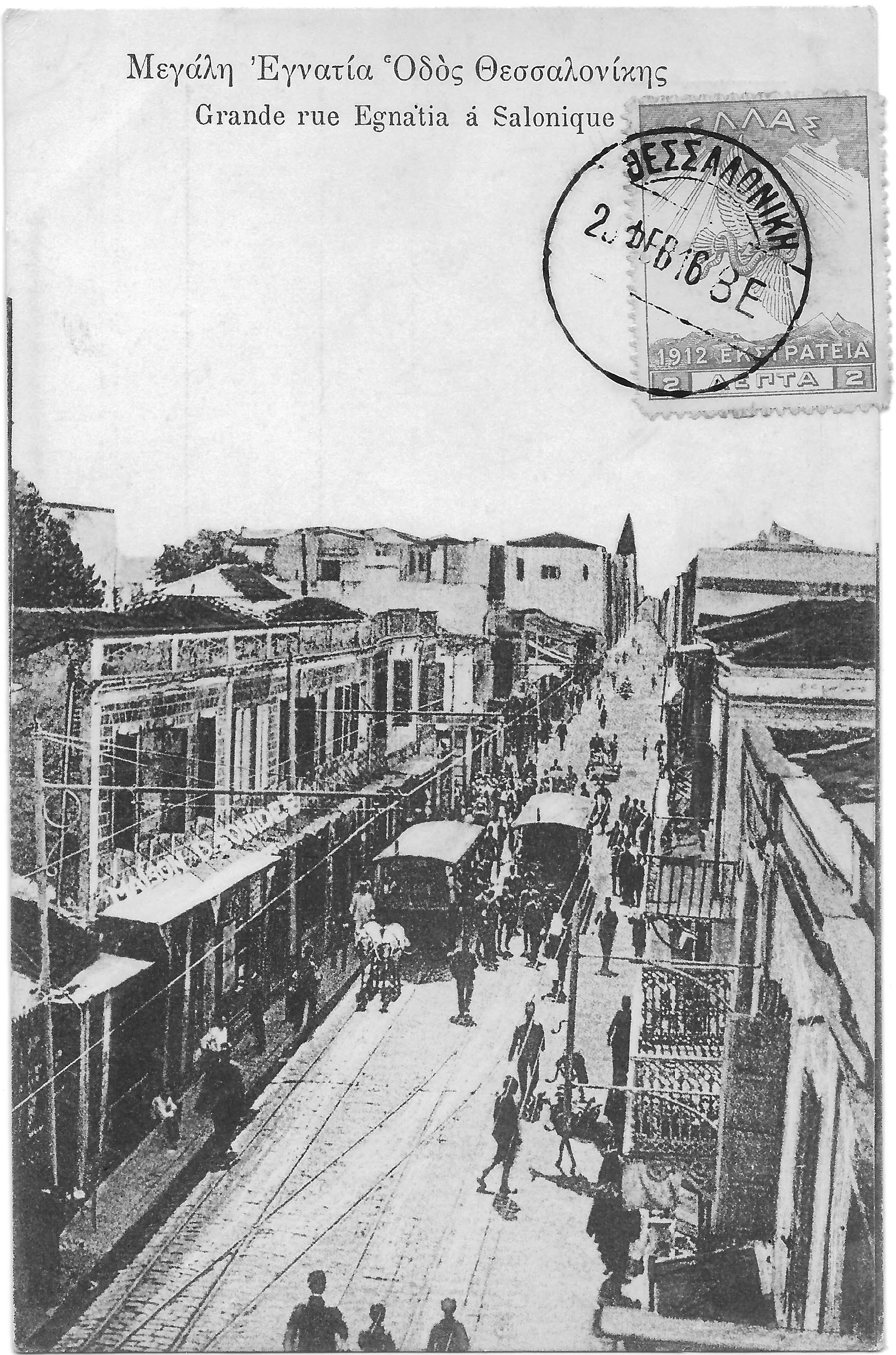
Horse trams in Egnatia, 1916

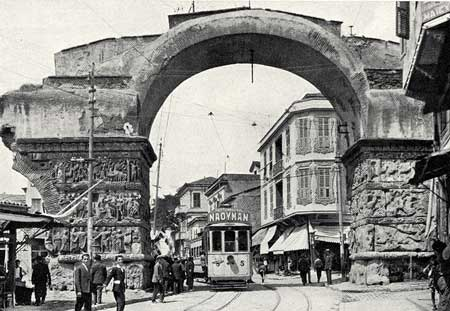
The tram and the arch, 1920

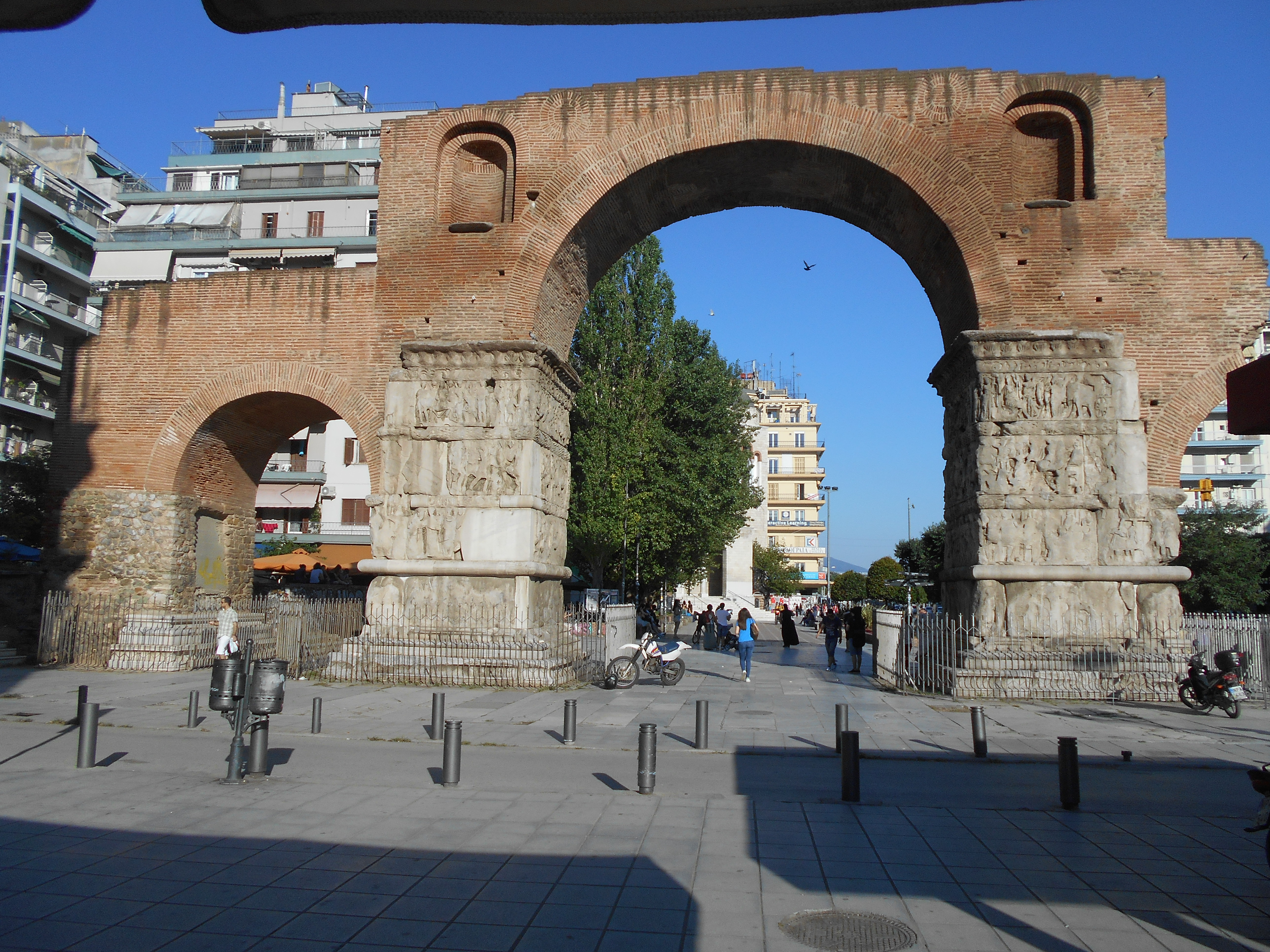
Arch of Galerius

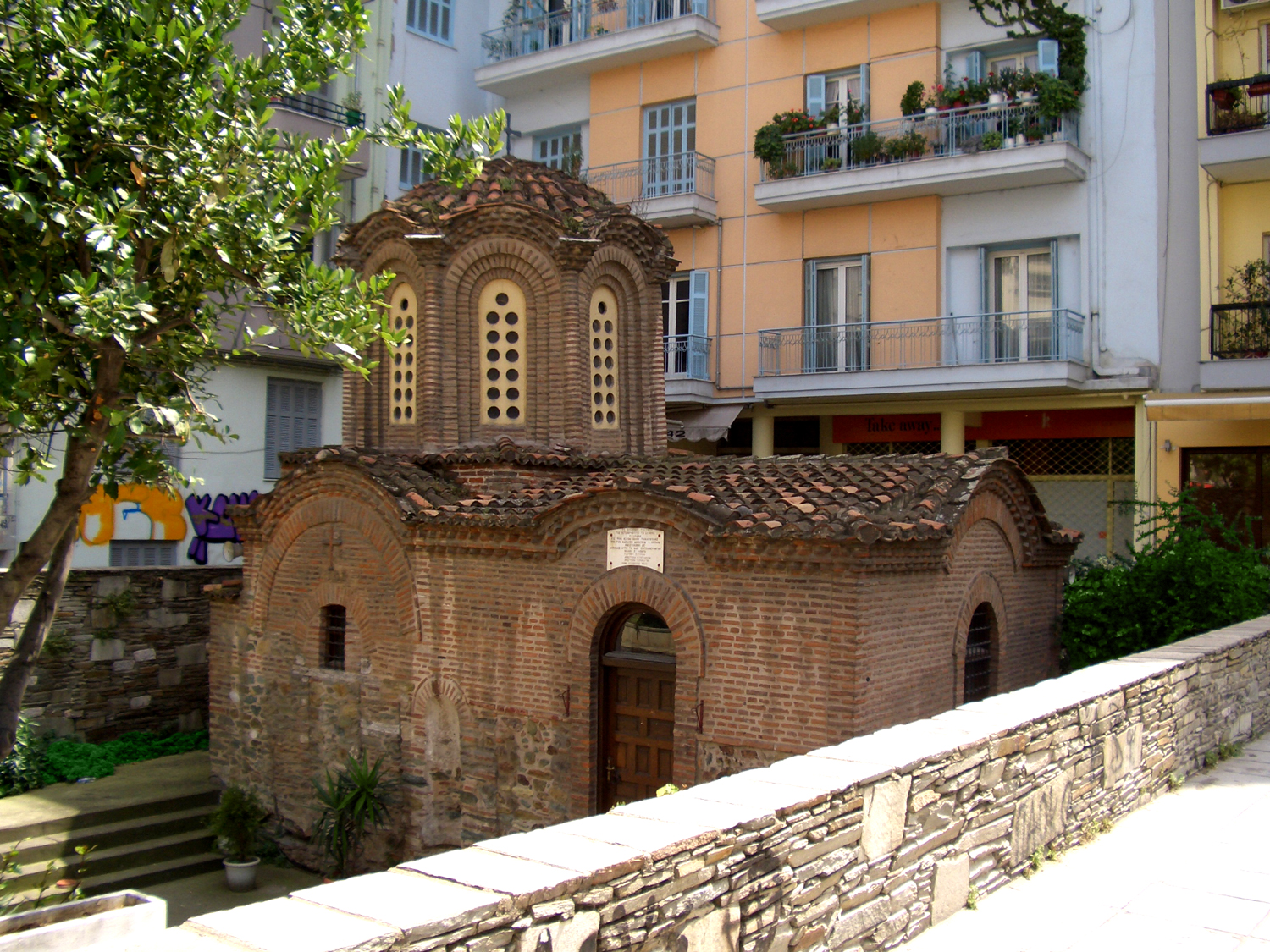
Chapel of the Saviour on Egnatia

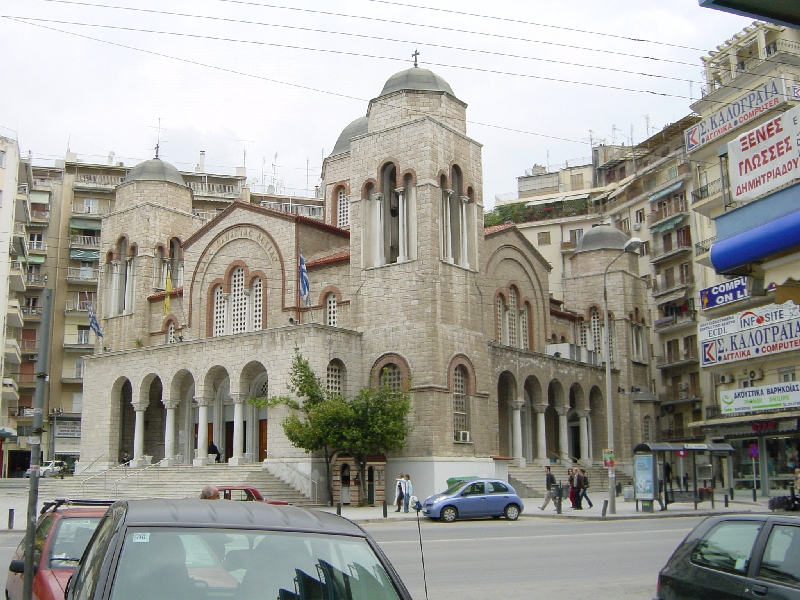
Panagia Dexia church

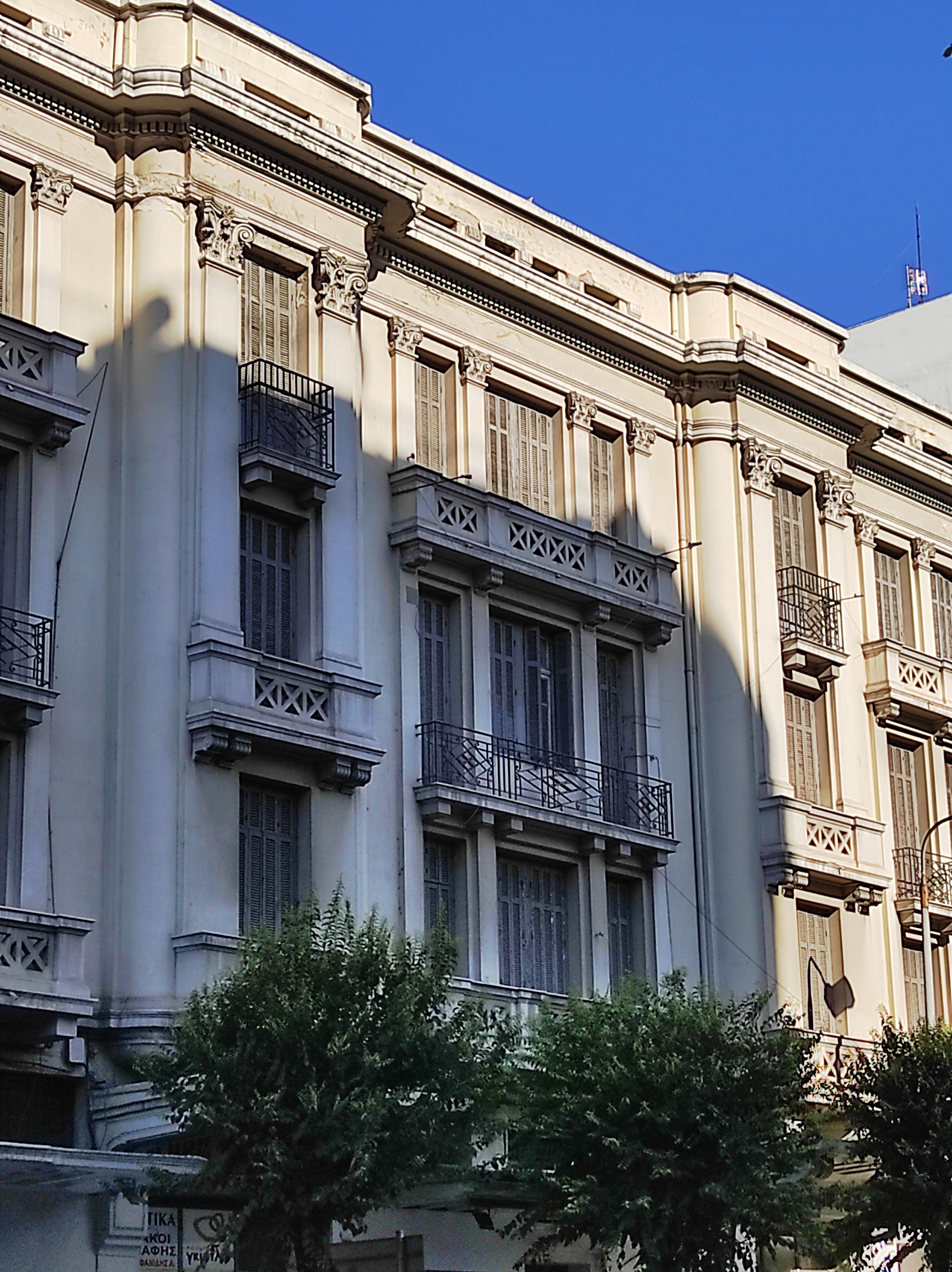
Stoa (Market) Colombou

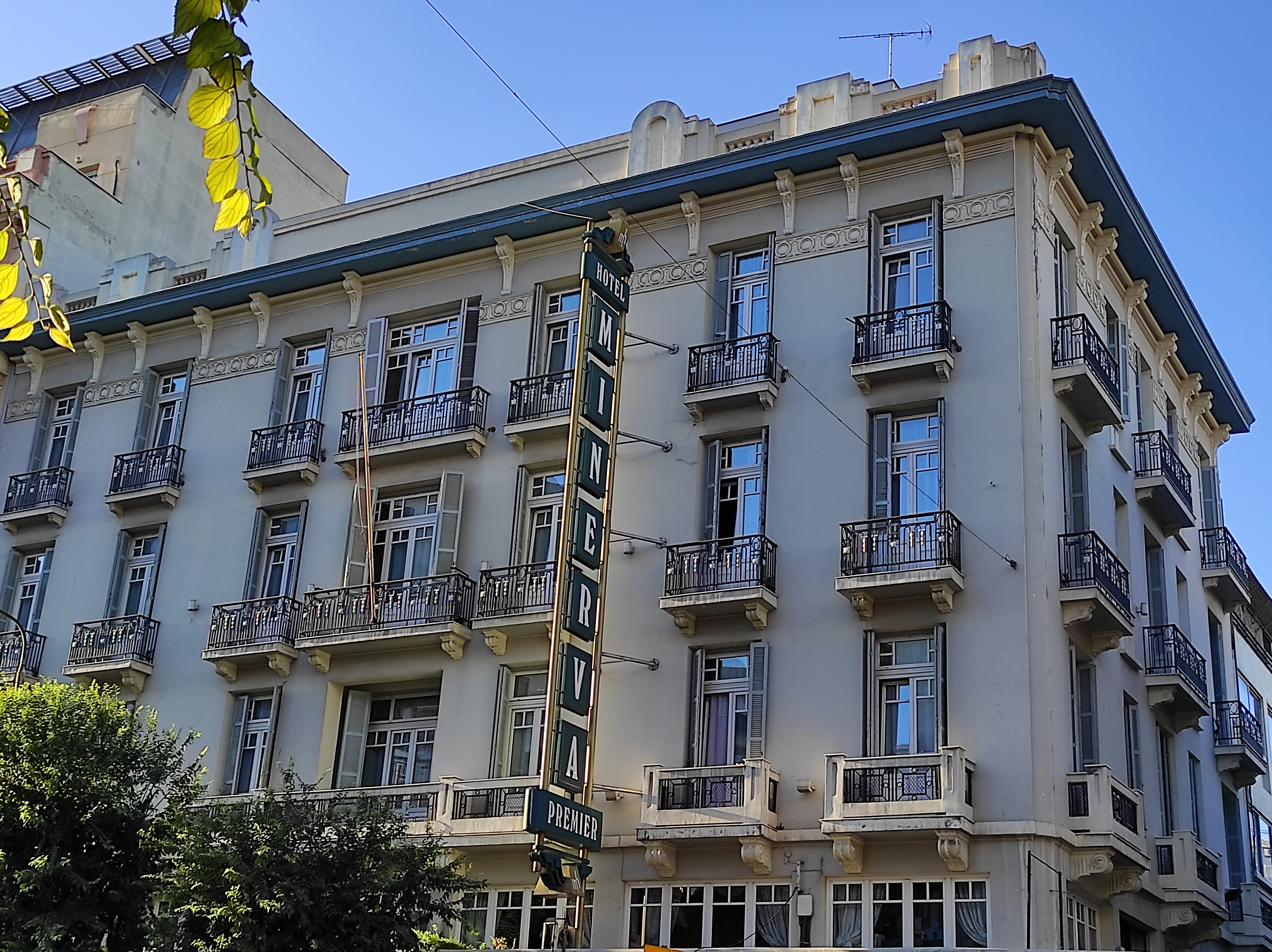
Hotel Minerva

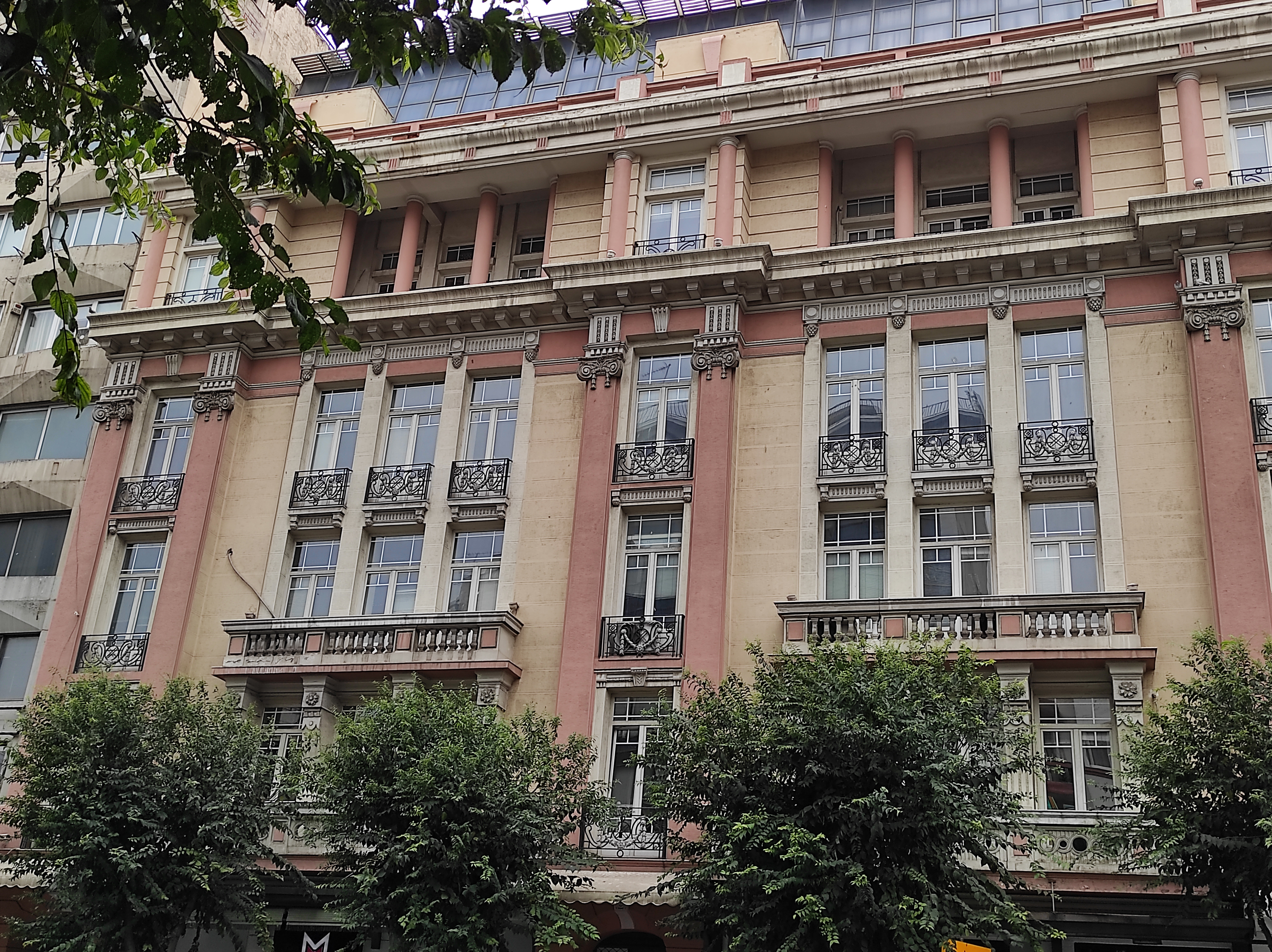
The former Hotel Gran Bretagne (arch. Max Rubens)

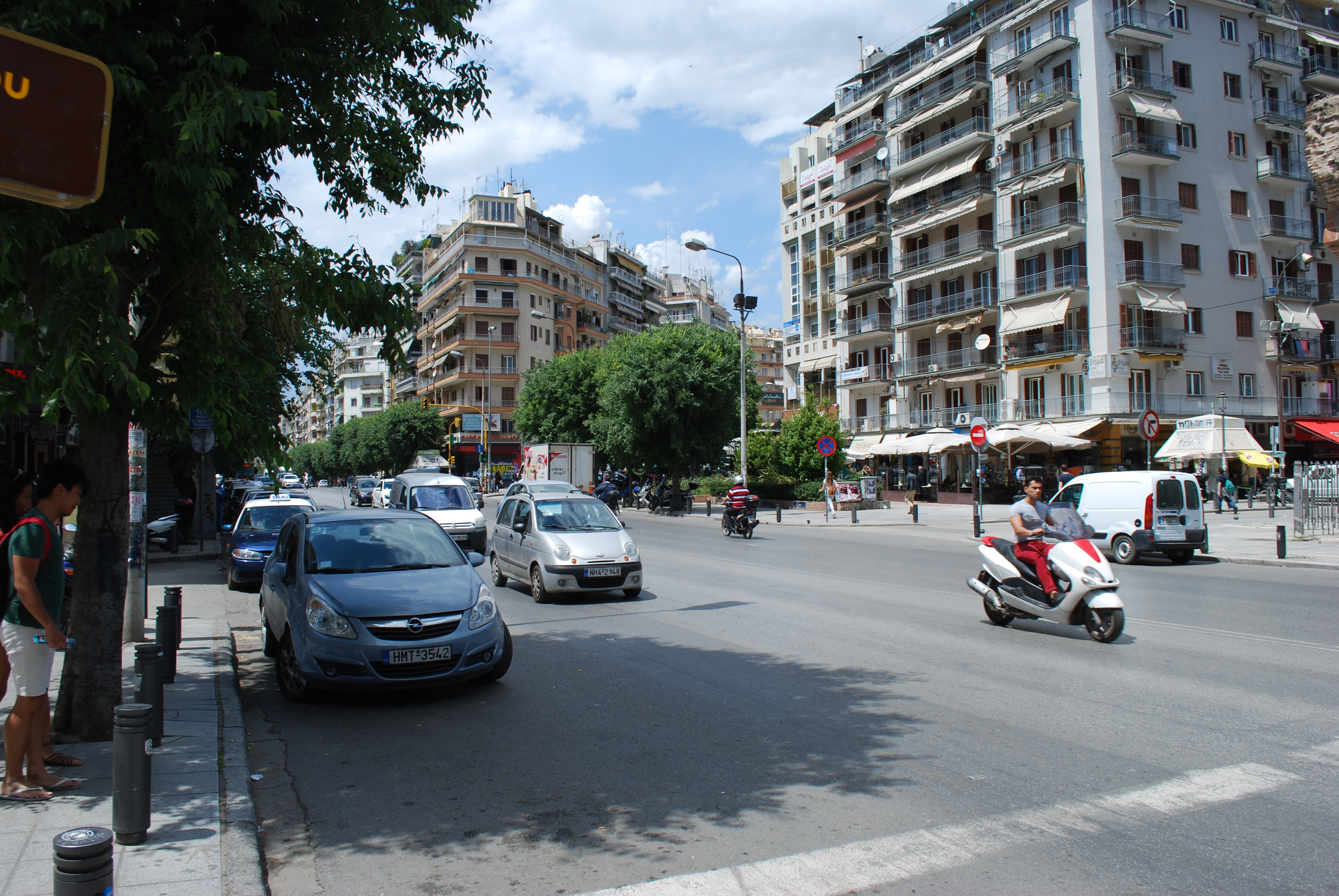
Egnatia/Iasonidou
