= Thessaloniki Transport Authority =

- Abbreviation: ΟΣΕΘ (OSETH); TheTA
- Formation: 25 July 2017
- Type: Anonymi Etaireia
- Purpose: Transport authority
- Region served: Thessaloniki
- Website: oseth.com.gr

The Thessaloniki Transport Authority (Greek: Οργανισμός Συγκοινωνιακού Έργου Θεσσαλονίκης, 'Thessaloniki Transport Project Organisation', abbreviated as ΟΣΕΘ), is an anonymous company which plans, coordinates, and oversees the urban transportation network of Thessaloniki, the second largest city in Greece. It is abbreviated as TheTA in English, a wordplay on the letter Theta which the first letter the word "Thessaloniki" in Greek. Its creation was necessitated in anticipation of the completion of the Thessaloniki Metro in 2023, which will see the city's bus network redeveloped, and the TheTA will take over the role of the Thessaloniki Urban Transport Organization once the metro is opened.

== Fare zones ==
TheTA controls the price of tickets for both buses and the metro system. It has divided the Thessaloniki region into three zones: Urban, Suburban, and Intercity. The Thessaloniki Metro falls entirely within the Urban fare zone. Buses X1 and X2 to Thessaloniki Airport have a standard ticket price of €2 regardless of zone, as does cultural bus route 50.
