= 1988–89 AEK Athens F.C. season =

AEK Athens
1988–89 season
- Chairman: Stratos Gidopoulos
- Manager: Dušan Bajević
- Stadium: AEK Stadium
- Alpha Ethniki: 1st
- Greek Cup: Round of 32
- UEFA Cup: First round
- Top goalscorer: League: Mirosław Okoński (11); All: Mirosław Okoński (11)
- Highest home attendance: 28,399 (vs Panathinaikos)
- Lowest home attendance: 4,053* (vs Olympiacos); *The match was held at Diagoras Stadium.
- Average home league attendance: 15,464
- Biggest win: AEK Athens 5–1 Levadiakos
- Biggest defeat: Levadiakos 3–1 AEK Athens; Athletic Bilbao 2–0 AEK Athens
Home colours	Away colours

The 1988–89 season was the 65th season in the existence of AEK Athens F.C. and the 30th consecutive season in the top flight of Greek football. They competed in the Alpha Ethniki, the Greek Cup and the UEFA Cup. The season began on 21 August 1988 and finished on 21 May 1989.

== Kits ==
Supplier: Zita Hellas
Sponsor(s): Ethniki Asfalistiki

Home	Away

== Overview ==
In the summer of 1988, an administrative change came to AEK Athens, since the major shareholder, Andreas Zafiropoulos stepped down, with a large portion of the supporters against him and handed over the management of club to the nightclub owner, Stratos Gidopoulos. The former footballer, Dušan Bajević returned to club after 7 years, taking charge as manager. The administration supported Bajević by signing the Polish international, Mirosław Okoński, while Stelios Manolas was convinced to stay. Apart from the completion of major singinigs, Gidopoulos for his part, brought a sense of optimism to the club for the first time in years, while generally proving to be a capable agent who ensured that the club not to feel inferior to its financially stronger rivals.

AEK competed in the UEFA Cup, where they played against Athletic Bilbao in the first round. In the first leg in a full AEK Stadium, despite the pouring rain, AEK pressed from the start and managed to take an early lead with an impressive header from Pittas. The match was intense and particularly hard. The Basques pushed for an equalizer, but AEK also had chances to extend the score. In the end, the fluid 1–0 remained and the rematch was set for 14 days later in the Basque Country. In the second leg, in the packed San Mamès, AEK were stunned and concieded 2 quick goals by Uralde. By the 6th minute, Athletic had already a qualification score and the remaining 84 minutes went by with AEK looking for the goal. In the end, that goal never came, despite some tepid chances. A highlight of the match at San Mamès, the human wall erected by the Basque supporters to protect those of AEK from the Spanish police, an unforgettable move that was duly appreciated by the Greek excursionists.

In the Cup, AEK qualified as first in their respective group in the first round. Afterwards, they did not do well, since they were eliminated in the second round by Levadiakos, with the yellow-blacks having major complaints from the referee in the second leg, with Gidopoulos as their main expressor.

Bajević quickly built a tight and well-worked team, which had the best defense in the league and knew how to get the results in most matches, while they remained close to the top throughout the season. In December despite the departure of the last season's top scorer Henrik Nielsen, Stavros Stamatis and Toni Savevski arrived to the club, but AEK still were considered to be an outsider for the conquest of the league.

The decisive moment of the season was the away match against Olympiacos on 7 May, for the penultimate matchday of the Championship. The atmosphere at the period of the preparation of the two clubs before the match was intense. The players of Olympiacos cut a celebratory cake with the inscription "Olympiacos-AEK 4–0" at the "tower" of their president, Argyris Saliarelis in Aegina, while at the same time the players of AEK were doing a mini-preparation at Parnitha.

At the Olympic Stadium the match started with Olympiacos pressing hard, but the defense of AEK as well as Ikonomopoulos held well. The pressure of the red and whites kept increasing, but the yellow-blacks did not concede a goal. The clearance of the ball at the goaline by Manolas with his head on the header of Détári and the spirited play of the whole team in general kept them intact during the match. At the 83rd minute, in a counterattack of AEK, Karagiozopoulos, who had come in as a substitute, made the "1-2" with Okoński and scored the goal that gave AEK a historic title victory.

The key players of the team were Okoński, Manolas, Savvidis, Savevski and Ikonomopoulos. The goalkeeper of AEK in specific had a remarkable performance, giving valuable points to the team with 3 crucial penalty-kick saves throughout the season and was nicknamed "Mr. Championship 1989" by the supporters. The team's top scorer in the league was Mirosław Okoński with 11 goals.

== Management team ==
Position	Staff
Manager	(Socialist Federal Republic of Yugoslavia) Dušan Bajević
Assistant manager	(Greece) Petros Ravousis
Goalkeeping coach	(Greece) Stelios Serafidis
Scout	(Greece) Aris Tsachouridis
Head of Medical	(Greece) Lakis Nikolaou

== Players ==
=== Squad information ===
NOTE: The players are the ones that have been announced by the AEK Athens' press release. No edits should be made unless a player arrival or exit is announced. Updated 21 May 1989, 23:59 UTC+3.

Player	Nat.	Position(s)	Date of birth (Age)	Signed	Previous club	Transfer fee	Contract until
Goalkeepers
Antonis Minou	(Greece)	GK	4 May 1958 (aged 31)	1988	(Greece) Panathinaikos	₯50,000,000	1991
Spyros Ikonomopoulos (Vice-captain 2)	(Greece)	GK	25 July 1959 (aged 29)	1979	(Greece) AEK Athens U20	—	1989
Fanis Kofinas	(Greece)	GK	5 September 1960 (aged 28)	1982	(Greece) Pelopas Kiato	Free	1992
Defenders
Makis Chatzis	(Greece)	RB / LB	30 March 1957 (aged 32)	1984	(Greece) Apollon Athens	₯6,750,000	1989
Takis Karagiozopoulos	(Greece)	CB / DM / ST	4 February 1961 (aged 28)	1981	(Greece) Veria	₯8,000,000	1991
Stelios Manolas	(Greece)	CB / RB	13 July 1961 (aged 27)	1980	(Greece) AEK Athens U20	—	1993
Giorgos Peppes	(Greece)	CB	26 October 1961 (aged 27)	1986	(Greece) Ethnikos Piraeus	₯10,000,000	1991
Christos Vasilopoulos	(Greece)	RB / LB	12 November 1962 (aged 26)	1986	(Greece) Panachaiki	₯8,000,000	1991
Georgios Koutoulas	(Greece)	CB / LB	9 February 1967 (aged 22)	1987	(Greece) AEK Athens U20	—	1993
Dimitris Volonakis	(Greece) (Australia)	LB / CB	27 February 1967 (aged 22)	1987	(Greece) AEK Athens U20	—	1990
Michalis Karousis	(Greece)	CB	1968 (aged 20–21)	1988	(Greece) AEK Athens U20	—	1989
Midfielders
Dimitris Pittas	(Greece)	AM / SS / CM	8 April 1958 (aged 31)	1986	(Greece) PAOK	Free	1989
Mirosław Okoński	(Poland)	AM / ST / SS	8 December 1958 (aged 30)	1988	(West Germany) Hamburger SV	₯100,000,000	1990
Pavlos Papaioannou (Vice-captain)	(Greece) (Brazil)	DM / RB / LB / RM	19 May 1959 (aged 30)	1983	(Greece) Rodos	₯10,000,000	1993
Giorgos Savvidis (Captain)	(Cyprus)	RM / AM / RW / SS / ST	8 February 1961 (aged 28)	1987	(Cyprus) Omonia	₯20,940,600	1992
Lampros Georgiadis	(Greece)	LM / AM / LB	11 July 1963 (aged 25)	1986	(Greece) Anagennisi Arta	₯11,000,000	1991
Toni Savevski	(Socialist Federal Republic of Yugoslavia)	CM / LM / DM	14 July 1963 (aged 25)	1988	(Socialist Federal Republic of Yugoslavia) Vardar	Free	1991
Jim Patikas	(Australia) (Greece)	RM / LM / RW / LW / SS	18 October 1963 (aged 25)	1985	(Australia) Sydney Croatia	₯5,000,000	1991
Stavros Stamatis	(Greece)	DM / CM / CB / RB / LB / AM	31 January 1966 (aged 23)	1988	(Greece) Charavgiakos	₯22,000,000	1993
Giorgos Famelis	(Greece)	CM / DM	19 August 1967 (aged 21)	1988	(Greece) AO Vouliagmeni	₯3,000,000	1991
Charalampos Zarotiadis	(Greece)	CM / AM / SS	28 April 1968 (aged 21)	1988	(Greece) AEK Athens U20	—	1991
Giorgos Papakostoulis	(Greece)	CM	2 October 1971 (aged 17)	1988	(Greece) Atromitos Agioi Anargyroi	Free	1991
Forwards
Dimosthenis Batalis	(Australia) (Greece)	ST	20 June 1964 (aged 25)	1988	(Australia) Sydney Olympic	Free	1991
Giannakis Ioannou	(Cyprus)	ST	29 August 1966 (aged 22)	1988	(United States) New York Pancyprian	₯5,000,000	1993
Frank Klopas	(United States) (Greece)	SS / ST / AM	1 September 1966 (aged 22)	1988	(United States) Chicago Sting	Free	1993
Georgios Christodoulou	(Greece)	ST / SS / LW	20 May 1967 (aged 22)	1985	(Greece) Akratitos	Free	1993
Left during Winter Transfer Window
Polyvios Chatzopoulos	(Greece)	CB / DM	17 July 1961 (aged 27)	1985	(Greece) Panionios	₯10,400,000	1990
Sotiris Mavrodimos	(Greece)	CB / DM / RB / LB	18 July 1962 (aged 26)	1986	(Greece) Kozani	₯5,500,000	1991
Theodosis Kokotos	(Greece)	LB / CB / RB	29 May 1966 (aged 23)	1988	(Greece) Panetolikos	₯6,000,000	1990
Giannis Dintsikos	(Greece)	ST / SS / RW / LW / AM	25 June 1960 (aged 29)	1981	(Greece) Kastoria	₯20,000,000	1991
Henrik Nielsen	(Denmark)	ST / SS	29 March 1965 (aged 24)	1987	(Denmark) B93	₯7,000,000	1990
Michalis Manginas	(Greece)	RW / RM	13 April 1969 (aged 20)	1988	(Greece) Ethnikos Nea Makri	₯1,700,000	1991

== Transfers ==
=== In ===
==== Summer ====
Pos.	Player	From	Fee	Date	Contract Until	Source
GK	(Greece) Antonis Minou	(Greece) Panathinaikos	₯50,000,000	13 July 1988	30 June 1991	
DF	(Greece) Michalis Karousis	(Greece) AEK Athens U20	Promotion	1 July 1988	30 June 1989	
DF	(Greece) Theodosis Kokotos	(Greece) Panetolikos	₯6,000,000	15 July 1988	30 June 1990	
MF	(Greece) Charalampos Zarotiadis	(Greece) AEK Athens U20	Promotion	1 July 1988	30 June 1991	
MF	(Greece) Giorgos Papakostoulis	(Greece) Atromitos Agioi Anargyroi	Free transfer	1 July 1988	30 June 1991	
MF	(Poland) Mirosław Okoński	(West Germany) Hamburger SV	₯100,000,000	4 July 1988	30 June 1990	
FW	(Greece) Michalis Manginas	(Greece) Ethnikos Nea Makri	₯1,700,000	1 July 1988	30 June 1991	
FW	(Greece) Georgios Christodoulou	(Greece) Acharnaikos	Loan return	1 July 1988	30 June 1993	
FW	(Greece) Michalis Pytharoulis	(Greece) Fostiras	Loan return	1 July 1988	30 June 1989	
FW	(Cyprus) Giannakis Ioannou	(United States) New York Pancyprian	₯5,000,000^{[a]}	14 July 1988	30 June 1993	

==== Winter ====
Pos.	Player	From	Fee	Date	Contract Until	Source
MF	(Greece) Stavros Stamatis	(Greece) Charavgiakos	₯22,000,000^{[b]}	14 December 1988	30 November 1993	
MF	(Socialist Federal Republic of Yugoslavia) Toni Savevski	(Socialist Federal Republic of Yugoslavia) Vardar	₯34,000,000^{[c]}	22 November 1988	30 June 1991	
FW	(United States) Frank Klopas	(United States) Chicago Sting	Free transfer	4 November 1988	30 November 1993	
FW	(Australia) Dimosthenis Batalis	(Australia) Sydney Olympic	₯20,000,000	1 December 1988	30 November 1991	

=== Out ===
==== Summer ====
Pos.	Player	To	Fee	Date	Source
GK	(Greece) Theologis Papadopoulos	(Greece) Panionios	Contract termination	11 July 1988	
MF	(Greece) Nikos Pias	(Greece) Olympiacos Volos	₯6,500,000	24 June 1988	
MF	(Socialist Federal Republic of Yugoslavia) Rajko Janjanin	Retired		16 July 1988	
MF	(Greece) Vasilios Vasilakos	(Greece) Panionios	Contract termination	10 July 1988	
FW	(Greece) Michalis Pytharoulis	Free agent	Contract termination	1 July 1988	

==== Winter ====
Pos.	Player	To	Fee	Date	Source
DF	(Greece) Polyvios Chatzopoulos	(Greece) Diagoras	₯4,000,000	5 December 1988	
DF	(Greece) Sotiris Mavrodimos	(Greece) Olympiacos Volos	₯5,000,000	15 December 1988	
FW	(Greece) Giannis Dintsikos	(Greece) Kastoria	Contract termination	18 November 1988	
FW	(Denmark) Henrik Nielsen	(Greece) Iraklis	₯30,000,000	15 December 1988	

=== Loan in ===
==== Summer ====
Pos.	Player	From	Fee	Date	Until	Option to buy	Source
MF	(Greece) Giorgos Famelis	(Greece) AO Vouliagmeni	₯3,000,000	1 July 1988	30 June 1991	✓	

=== Loan out ===
==== Winter ====
Pos.	Player	To	Fee	Date	Until	Option to buy	Source
DF	(Greece) Theodosis Kokotos	(Greece) Kallithea	Free	1 December 1988	30 June 1989	✗	
FW	(Greece) Michalis Manginas	(Greece) Kallithea	Free	1 December 1988	30 June 1989	✗	

=== Contract renewals ===
Pos.	Player	Date	Former Exp. Date	New Exp. Date	Source
DF	(Greece) Stelios Manolas	8 July 1988	30 November 1989	30 November 1993	
DF	(Greece) Georgios Koutoulas	26 July 1988	30 June 1990	30 June 1993	
MF	(Greece) Pavlos Papaioannou	15 June 1988	30 June 1988	30 June 1993	
MF	(Australia) Jim Patikas	7 June 1988	30 November 1988	30 June 1991	
MF	(Greece) Dimitris Pittas	10 November 1988	30 November 1988	30 November 1989^{[d]}	

Notes

a. the money went to the player's previous club, Pezoporiakos.
b. plus Panagiotis Savvidis (from the reserve time).
c. and a friendly game between the two teams.
d. 1+1+1 years.

=== Overall transfer activity ===
==== Expenditure ====
Summer: ▼ ₯285,700,000

Winter: ▼ ₯76,000,000

Total: ▼ ₯361,700,000

==== Income ====
Summer: ▲ ₯6,500,000

Winter: ▲ ₯39,000,000

Total: ▲ ₯45,500,000

==== Net Totals ====
Summer: ▼ ₯279,200,000

Winter: ▼ ₯37,000,000

Total: ▼ ₯306,200,000

== Pre-season and friendlies ==
18 July 1988 Friendly	Austria Salzburg	0–0	AEK Athens	Salzburg
19:30 EEST (UTC+3)		Report		Stadium: Stadion Lehen; Attendance: 3,000; Referee: Gerald Losert (Austria)

20 July 1988 Friendly	Vorwärts Steyr	1–3	AEK Athens	Salzburg
20:00 EEST (UTC+3)	Novak 38'	Report	Patikas 8', 56'; Okoński (yellow card) 15'; Savvidis 31'; Manolas (yellow card) 45'	Attendance: 3,000; Referee: Rudolf Finzinger (Austria)

22 July 1988 Friendly	FC Schladming	0–9	AEK Athens	Schladming
20:00 EEST (UTC+3)		Report	Nielsen, (penalty missed); Christodoulou; Manginas; Ioannou
Note: The veterans Mimis Papaioannou and Petros Ravousis, the team's paid manager and the assistant coach, respectively, competed with AEK. The first made two assists.

27 July 1988 Friendly	AEK Athens	2–2	Galatasaray	Nea Filadelfeia
21:00 EEST (UTC+3)	Okoński 11'; Christodoulou 68'	Report	Tüfekçi 55'; Prekazi 70'	Stadium: AEK Stadium; Attendance: 21,101; Referee: Makis Germanakos (Athens)

1 August 1988 Friendly	AEK Athens	1–2	Dundee United	Nea Filadelfeia
21:00 EEST (UTC+3)	Pittas 83' (pen.)	Report	Savvidis 53' (o.g.); Redford 79'	Stadium: AEK Stadium; Attendance: 15,962; Referee: Vassilios Nikakis (Aetoloacarnania)

3 August 1988 Friendly	AEK Athens	4–1	Aris	Nea Filadelfeia
21:00 EEST (UTC+3)	Nielsen 23', 32'; Manolas 72'; Okoński 73'	Report	Samolis 61'	Stadium: AEK Stadium; Attendance: 7,177; Referee: Kostas Dimitriadis (Piraeus)

8 August 1988 Friendly	Galatasaray	3–4	AEK Athens	Istanbul
17:30 EEST (UTC+3)	Çolak 73' (pen.), 75', 82' (pen.)	Report	Nielsen 36'; Okoński 62'; Patikas 65'; Savvidis 67'	Stadium: BJK İnönü Stadium; Attendance: 45,000; Referee: Taner Yalçındağ (Turkey)

10 August 1988 Friendly	AEK Athens	4–2	PAOK	Nea Filadelfeia
21:00 EEST (UTC+3)	Pittas 20', 55'; Patikas 43'; Nielsen 70' (pen.)	Report	Fernando 36'; Lagonidis (yellow card) 44'; Skartados 60' (pen.)	Stadium: AEK Stadium; Attendance: 13,648; Referee: Dimitris Giakoumatos (Athens)

17 August 1988 Friendly	AEK Athens	0–1	AEL	Nea Filadelfeia
21:00 EEST (UTC+3)		Report	Bannon 56'	Stadium: AEK Stadium; Attendance: 9,741; Referee: Sotiris Vorgias (Athens)

23 August 1988 Friendly	AEK Athens	0–2	Ethnikos Piraeus	Nea Filadelfeia
21:00 EEST (UTC+3)		Report	Batista (yellow card) 16', (goal) 41', 52'; Xanthopoulos (red card) 39'	Stadium: AEK Stadium; Attendance: 3,877; Referee: Kostas Akridas (Athens)
Note: On the bench of AEK was the assistant of Bajević, Petros Ravousis.

25 August 1988 Friendly	Olympiacos Chalkida	1–1	AEK Athens	Chalkida
17:45 EEST (UTC+3)	Lagos (yellow card) 28'; Anagnostakis 30'; Saklaras (yellow card) 36'	Report	Papaioannou (yellow card) 36'; Zarotiadis (yellow card) 50'; Christodoulou 75' (pen.)	Stadium: Municipal Stadium of Chalkida; Attendance: 2,500
Note: On the bench of AEK was the assistant of Bajević, Petros Ravousis.

30 August 1988 Friendly	AEK Athens	4–1	Doxa Drama	Nea Filadelfeia
21:00 EEST (UTC+3)	Dintsikos 27', 70'; Savvidis 37'; Christodoulou 86'	Report	Kalaitzidis 62'	Stadium: AEK Stadium; Attendance: 5,000; Referee: Theodoros Kefalas (Athens)

12 October 1988 Friendly	AEK Athens	3–2	Velež Mostar	Nea Filadelfeia
18:00 EEST (UTC+3)	Pittas 64'; Batalis 73'; Manginas 88'	Report	Kajtaz 3'; Repak 34'	Stadium: AEK Stadium; Attendance: 1,500; Referee: Kostas Adamopoulos (Athens)

1 December 1988 Friendly	AEK Athens	6–0	Agioi Anargyroi	Nea Filadelfeia
	Batalis; Pittas (pen.); Ioannou; Savevski	Report		Stadium: AEK Stadium; Attendance: 30

8 December 1988 Friendly	AEK Athens	0–0	Ilioupoli	Nea Filadelfeia
14:30 EET (UTC+2)		Report		Stadium: AEK Stadium

11 January 1989 Friendly	AEK Athens	1–2	Sarıyer	Nea Filadelfeia
15:00 EET (UTC+2)	Karagiozopoulos 70' (pen.)	Report	Görgülü 58', 86'	Stadium: AEK Stadium; Referee: Kostas Adamopoulos (Athens)

22 February 1989 Friendly	AEK Athens	2–2	Łódź	Thrakomakedones
	Pittas 66'; Stamatis 88'		Soczyński 38'; Leszczyński 52'	Stadium: AEK Athens' Training Complex

9 March 1989 Friendly	AEK Athens	3–0	Acharnaikos	Thrakomakedones
15:30 EET (UTC+2)	Christodoulou 10'; Pittas 47'; Volonakis 55'	Report		Stadium: AEK Athens' Training Complex; Attendance: 100

16 March 1989 Friendly	AEK Athens	10–0	Porfyras	Thrakomakedones
15:30 EET (UTC+2)	Zarotiadis 8', 13'; Volonakis 15'; Georgiadis 26'; Klopas 34', 44', 65'; Ioannou 50'; Christodoulou 60'; Mylonas 72'	Report		Stadium: AEK Athens' Training Complex

18 May 1989 Friendly	AEK Athens	11–0	Agios Konstantinos	Nea Filadelfeia
18:00 EEST (UTC+3)	Christodoulou 6', 37'; Okoński 10'; Papakostoulis 15'; Klopas 20', 65'; Ioannou 55', 83'; Georgiadis 74', 90'; Batalis 77'	Report		Stadium: AEK Stadium

== Competitions ==
=== Overall record ===
Competition	First match	Last match	Starting round	Final position	Record							
Competition	First match	Last match	Starting round	Final position	Pld	W	D	L	GF	GA	GD	Win %
Alpha Ethniki	11 September 1988	21 May 1989	Matchday 1	Winners	30	19	6	5	45	20	+25	63.33
Greek Cup	21 August 1988	14 December 1988	Group Stage	Round of 32	4	3	0	1	7	4	+3	75.00
UEFA Cup	7 September 1988	5 October 1988	First round	First round	2	1	1	0	1	2	−1	50.00
Total					36	23	7	6	53	26	+27	63.89

Last updated: 21 May 1989
Source: Competitions

=== Alpha Ethniki ===
==== League table ====
Pos	Team	Pld	W	D	L	GF	GA	GD	Pts	Qualification or relegation
1	AEK Athens (C)	30	19	6	5	45	20	+25	44	Qualification for European Cup first round
2	Olympiacos	30	16	9	5	54	25	+29	41	Qualification for UEFA Cup first round
3	Panathinaikos	30	14	9	7	45	25	+20	37	Qualification for Cup Winners' Cup first round
4	Iraklis	30	13	10	7	43	27	+16	36	Qualification for UEFA Cup first round
5	OFI	30	13	8	9	45	36	+9	34	

Source: RSSSF
Rules for classification: 1st points; 2nd head-to-head points; 3rd head-to-head goal difference; 4th decision match.
(C) Champions

==== Results summary ====
Overall								Home						Away					
Pld	W	D	L	GF	GA	GD	Pts	W	D	L	GF	GA	GD	W	D	L	GF	GA	GD
30	19	6	5	45	20	+25	63	10	3	2	31	13	+18	9	3	3	14	7	+7

Source: Competitive matches

==== Results by Matchday ====
Round	1	2	3	4	5	6	7	8	9	10	11	12	13	14	15	16	17	18	19	20	21	22	23	24	25	26	27	28	29	30
Ground	A	H	A	A	H	A	H	A	H	H	A	H	A	H	A	H	A	H	H	A	H	A	H	A	A	H	A	H	A	H
Result	L	W	W	L	W	D	W	D	W	W	W	W	D	L	W	W	W	D	L	W	W	W	W	W	W	D	L	W	W	D
Position	14	10	6	8	3	7	3	2	3	2	2	1	1	3	2	2	1	2	2	2	2	1	1	1	1	1	1	1	1	1

Source: Competitive matches
A = Away; H = Home; W = Win; D = Draw; L = Loss; P = Postponed

==== Matches ====
11 September 1988 1	Panionios	1–0	AEK Athens	Piraeus
17:00 EEST (UTC+3)	Papadopoulos (yellow card); Kapouranis (yellow card); Anastopoulos 21', (yellow card)			Stadium: Karaiskakis Stadium; Attendance: 26,515; Referee: Dimitris Giakoumatos (Athens)

18 September 1988 2	AEK Athens	3–1	Apollon Kalamarias	Nea Filadelfeia
17:00 EEST (UTC+3)	Pittas (yellow card); Okoński 26', (yellow card); Manolas 76'; Savvidis 81'		Vazakas (yellow card); Piniotis (yellow card); Traianopoulos (yellow card); Farakos (yellow card); Dimitriadis (yellow card); Bakitas 89', (yellow card)	Stadium: AEK Stadium; Attendance: 12,860; Referee: Sotiris Vorgias (Athens)

25 September 1988 3	Panathinaikos	0–1	AEK Athens	Marousi
15:30 EEST (UTC+3)	Saravakos (red card) 58'		Okoński 57'; Vasilopoulos (red card) 58'	Stadium: Olympic Stadium; Attendance: 60,145; Referee: Kostas Dimitriadis (Piraeus)

2 October 1988 4	Aris	1–0	AEK Athens	Trikala
15:30 EEST (UTC+3)	Moustakidis (yellow card); Tziolas (yellow card); Bmpisidis (yellow card); Dimitriadis 3'			Stadium: Trikala Municipal Stadium; Attendance: 12,026; Referee: Grigoris Brentas (Thessaloniki)

9 October 1988 5	AEK Athens	2–0	Ethnikos Piraeus	Nea Filadelfeia
15:30 EEST (UTC+3)	Papaioannou (yellow card) 42'; Christodoulou (yellow card) 56'; Nielsen 57'; Okoński 61'		Xanthopoulos (yellow card) 25'	Stadium: AEK Stadium; Attendance: 11,365; Referee: Giorgos Plevritis (Thessaloniki)

23 October 1988 6	Levadiakos	0–0	AEK Athens	Levadia
15:00 EEST (UTC+3)	Kasdovasilis (yellow card)		Peppes (yellow card)	Stadium: Levadia Municipal Stadium; Attendance: 4,631; Referee: Orestis Pavlidis (Dodecanese)

6 November 1988 7	AEK Athens	2–0	Doxa Drama	Nea Filadelfeia
15:30 EET (UTC+2)	Savvidis 32'; Okoński 36'		Drogalas (yellow card)	Stadium: AEK Stadium; Attendance: 5,334; Referee: Thanasis Mantas (Athens)

13 November 1988 8	Olympiacos Volos	1–1	AEK Athens	Volos
15:00 EET (UTC+2)	Tsogas (yellow card); Pias (yellow card); Karamichalos 3', (yellow card) (yellow-red card) 65'		Vasilopoulos (yellow card); Manolas (yellow card); Nielsen 86'	Stadium: Volos Municipal Stadium; Attendance: 7,475; Referee: Sotiris Vorgias (Athens)

20 November 1988 9	AEK Athens	2–1	Diagoras	Nea Filadelfeia
14:45 EET (UTC+2)	Pittas 8'; Nielsen 62' (pen.)		Konstantinidis (yellow card); Chatzoglou (yellow card) 49' (yellow-red card) 51'; Pseftis 70', (yellow card)	Stadium: AEK Stadium; Attendance: 8,146; Referee: Nikos Andreou (Athens)

27 November 1988 10	AEK Athens	3–0	OFI	Nea Filadelfeia
14:45 EET (UTC+2)	Nielsen (yellow card); Patikas 42'; Pittas (yellow card) 44' (yellow-red card) 44'; Famelis 81'; Savvidis 85'		Tsimpos (yellow card); Hisis (red card) 44'	Stadium: AEK Stadium; Attendance: 17,863; Referee: Orestis Pavlidis (Dodecanese)

4 December 1988 11	AEL	0–1	AEK Athens	Larissa
14:45 EET (UTC+2)	Kyrilidis (yellow card) 43'		Savevski (yellow card) 40'; Manolas (yellow card) 47'; Papaioannou (yellow card) 68'; Okoński 74'	Stadium: Alcazar Stadium; Attendance: 12,695; Referee: Kostas Dimitriadis (Piraeus)

11 December 1988 12	AEK Athens	4–2	Apollon Athens	Nea Filadelfeia
14:45 EET (UTC+2)	Okoński 4'; Manolas (yellow card) 31', (goal) 40'; Georgiadis (yellow card) 49'; Nielsen 74', 87' (pen.)		Apostolou 19'; Karavelis 24', (yellow card) 33'	Stadium: AEK Stadium; Attendance: 13,079; Referee: Grigoris Brentas (Thessaloniki)

31 December 1988 13	Iraklis	0–0	AEK Athens	Thessaloniki
14:00 EET (UTC+2)	Hatzipanagis (yellow card); D. Papadopoulos (yellow card); Anastasiadis (penalty missed) 85'		Peppes (yellow card); Savevski (yellow card); Papaioannou (yellow card)	Stadium: Kaftanzoglio Stadium; Attendance: 13,800; Referee: Nikos Chrysanis (Imathia)
Note: The game was scheduled to take place on 18 December, but was postponed due to heavy snowfall that hit Thessaloniki.

7 January 1989 14	AEK Athens	1–2	Olympiacos	Rhodes
14:45 EET (UTC+2)	Peppes 50'; Georgiadis (yellow card) 85'		Détári 8'; Funes (yellow card) 23'; Kaltaveridis (yellow card) 44'; Hantzidis 80'	Stadium: Diagoras Stadium; Attendance: 4,053; Referee: Makis Germanakos (Athens)
Note: The game was held in Rhodes because of a punishment with a game away from home due to the incidents in the cup match against Levadiakos.

15 January 1989 15	PAOK	0–1	AEK Athens	Thessaloniki
14:45 EET (UTC+2)	Lagonidis (yellow card)		Patikas (yellow card); Christodoulou 24'	Stadium: Toumba Stadium; Attendance: 31,969; Referee: Vassilios Nikakis (Aetoloacarnania)

22 January 1989 16	AEK Athens	2–0	Panionios	Nea Filadelfeia
14:45 EET (UTC+2)	Pittas 11', (yellow card); Okoński 38'		Papoulidis (yellow card)	Stadium: AEK Stadium; Attendance: 18,855; Referee: Stelios Charlavanis (Euboea)

29 January 1989 17	Apollon Kalamarias	0–1	AEK Athens	Thessaloniki
14:45 EET (UTC+2)	Semertzidis (yellow card) 79'; Kardos (penalty missed) 87'		Savevski 38'; Vasilopoulos (yellow card) 90'	Stadium: Kalamaria Stadium; Attendance: 5,796; Referee: Dimitris Bentas (Trikala)

5 February 1989 18	AEK Athens	0–0	Panathinaikos	Nea Filadelfeia
14:45 EET (UTC+2)	Papaioannou (yellow card) 42'		Chatziathanasiou (yellow card) 45'; Samaras (yellow card) 74'	Stadium: AEK Stadium; Attendance: 28,399; Referee: Makis Germanakos (Athens)

12 February 1989 19	AEK Athens	0–1	Aris	Nea Filadelfeia
15:00 EET (UTC+2)	Vasilopoulos (yellow card) 11'		Moustakidis (yellow card) 19'; Oikonomidis (yellow card) 23', (goal) 54'; Chatzinikolaou (yellow card) 82'	Stadium: AEK Stadium; Attendance: 16,009; Referee: Dimitris Bentas (Trikala)

20 February 1989 20	Ethnikos Piraeus	1–2	AEK Athens	Piraeus
15:00 EET (UTC+2)	Xanthopoulos (yellow card); Katsikogiannis (yellow card); Kottidis 10', (yellow card) 23'; Papoulias (penalty missed) 57'; Chojnacki (yellow card) 60'; Kampolis (yellow card) 68'		Savvidis 11'; Manolas 23', (yellow card) 30'	Stadium: Karaiskakis Stadium; Attendance: 13,977; Referee: Ilias Karamanis (Boeotia)
Note: The matchday was scheduled for 19 February, but was postponed for the following day due to the abdication of the referees.

26 February 1989 21	AEK Athens	5–1	Levadiakos	Nea Filadelfeia
15:00 EET (UTC+2)	Okoński 8'; Savevski 19' (pen.), 79'; Savvidis 26'; Christodoulou 88'		Kavouras 31'	Stadium: AEK Stadium; Attendance: 14,804; Referee: Giorgos Giannopoulos (Athens)

5 March 1989 22	Doxa Drama	1–2	AEK Athens	Drama
15:30 EET (UTC+2)	Michalitsos (yellow card); Vouzas 11'		Papaioannou (yellow card); Manolas 26'; Savvidis 65', (yellow card)	Stadium: Doxa Drama Stadium; Attendance: 5,547; Referee: Ilias Karamanis (Boeotia)

12 March 1989 23	AEK Athens	3–2	Olympiacos Volos	Nea Filadelfeia
15:30 EET (UTC+2)	Savevski 25' (pen.), 79'; Batalis 57'; Okoński 74'		Pias (yellow card) 56'; Mandalos 63'; Boda 88' (pen.)	Stadium: AEK Stadium; Attendance: 13,588; Referee: Giorgos Koukoulas (Lesbos)

19 March 1989 24	Diagoras	0–2	AEK Athens	Rhodes
15:30 EET (UTC+2)	Christodoulou 77'; Klopas 89'		Urzúa (yellow card)	Stadium: Diagoras Stadium; Attendance: 3,552; Referee: Nikos Andreou (Athens)

26 March 1989 25	OFI	0–1	AEK Athens	Marousi
16:30 EEST (UTC+3)	Vavoulas (yellow card)		Papaioannou (yellow card); Peppes (yellow card); Savvidis 37'	Stadium: Olympic Stadium; Attendance: 27,936; Referee: Giorgos Koukoulas (Lesbos)
Note: Due to the punishment of OFI, the game took place at the Olympic Stadium.

2 April 1989 26	AEK Athens	3–3	AEL	Nea Filadelfeia
16:30 EEST (UTC+3)	Koutoulas (yellow card) 20'; Okoński 32'; Savevski 70' (pen.); Stamatis 87', (yellow card)		Karapialis 20'; Alexoulis 40'; Kyriakoulis (yellow card) 70'; Ziogas 82'	Stadium: AEK Stadium; Attendance: 20,939; Referee: Nikos Vournelis (Thessaloniki)

9 April 1989 27	Apollon Athens	2–1	AEK Athens	Rizoupoli
16:30 EEST (UTC+3)	Mangioros (yellow card); Svoronos (yellow card); Karavelis (yellow card); Juričić 16'; Vasiliou 26'		Savevski 70' (pen.)	Stadium: Rizoupoli Stadium; Attendance: 10,729; Referee: Dimitris Bentas (Trikala)

16 April 1989 28	AEK Athens	1–0	Iraklis	Nea Filadelfeia
17:00 EEST (UTC+3)	Okoński 67'			Stadium: AEK Stadium; Attendance: 20,461; Referee: Giannis Iatropoulos (Piraeus)

7 May 1989 29	Olympiacos	0–1	AEK Athens	Marousi
19:30 EEST (UTC+3)	Baniotis (red card) 60'; Hantzidis (red card) 69'		Papaioannou (yellow card) 60'; Manolas (yellow card) 61' (yellow-red card) 76'; Peppes (red card) 69'; Savevski (yellow card) 79'; Karagiozopoulos 83'; Chatzis (red card) 90'	Stadium: Olympic Stadium; Attendance: 57,151; Referee: Ilias Karamanis (Boeotia)
Note: Before and after the match several incidents took place inside and outside the stadium with over 7,000 broken seats and 25 injuries.

21 May 1989 30	AEK Athens	0–0	PAOK	Nea Filadelfeia
17:30 EEST (UTC+3)			Small (yellow card)	Stadium: AEK Stadium; Attendance: 25,934; Referee: Giannis Iatropoulos (Piraeus)

=== Greek Cup ===
==== Group 13 ====
Pos	Team	Pld	W	D	L	GF	GA	GD	Pts	Qualification	AEK	PAR	EGA
1	AEK Athens	2	2	0	0	5	1	+4	4	Round of 32		2–1	—
2	Panarkadikos	2	1	0	1	3	2	+1	2	Round of 32	—		2–0
3	Egaleo	2	0	0	2	0	5	−5	0		0–3	—	

Source: epo.gr

==== Matches ====
21 August 1988 1	AEK Athens	2–1	Panarkadikos	Nea Filadelfeia
21:00 EEST (UTC+3)	Mavrodimos 8'; Nielsen 55' (pen.)		Moutsios 17' (pen.)	Stadium: AEK Stadium; Attendance: 12,000; Referee: Dimitris Bentas (Trikala)

28 August 1988 2	Egaleo	0–3	AEK Athens	Aigaleo
17:30 EEST (UTC+3)	Mavros (yellow card); Souvleris (yellow card)	Report	Manolas (yellow card); Nielsen 26'; Savvidis 75'; Pittas 90+2'	Stadium: Stavros Mavrothalassitis Stadium; Attendance: 6,498; Referee: Nikos Chrysanis (Imathia)

===== Round of 32 =====
30 November 1988 First leg	Levadiakos	3–1	AEK Athens	Levadia
14:45 EET (UTC+2)	Tsanas 14'; Peirano 21'; Kavalieris 26'; Martinaios (yellow card) 89'	Report	Famelis 27'; Okoński (yellow card) 37'	Stadium: Levadia Municipal Stadium; Attendance: 2,308; Referee: Nikos Chrysanis (Imathia)

14 December 1988 Second leg	AEK Athens	1–0 (2–3 agg.)	Levadiakos	Nea Filadelfeia
14:15 EET (UTC+2)	Manolas 21', (yellow card) 53'; Koutoulas (yellow card) 51'; Georgiadis (yellow card) 82'	Report	Kavalieris (yellow card) 82'; Martinaios (yellow card) 88'	Stadium: AEK Stadium; Attendance: 11,473; Referee: Panagiotis Koutris (Thessaloniki)

=== UEFA Cup ===
==== First round ====
7 September 1988 First leg	AEK Athens (Greece)	1–0	(Spain) Athletic Bilbao	Athens, Greece
21:00 EEST (UTC+3)	Pittas 32'	Report		Stadium: AEK Stadium; Attendance: 26,997; Referee: Bob Valentine (Scotland)

5 October 1988 Second leg	Athletic Bilbao (Spain)	2–0 (2–1 agg.)	(Greece) AEK Athens	Bilbao, Spain
21:15 EEST (UTC+3)	Uralde 3', 6'; Salinas (yellow card) 21'	Report	Famelis (yellow card) 9'; Pittas (yellow card) 74'	Stadium: Estadio San Mamés; Attendance: 35,000; Referee: Luigi Agnolin (Italy)

== Statistics ==
=== Squad statistics ===
As of 21 May 1989

No.	Pos	Player	Alpha Ethniki		Greek Cup		UEFA Cup		Total	
No.	Pos	Player	Apps	Goals	Apps	Goals	Apps	Goals	Apps	Goals
Goalkeepers
—	GK	(Greece) Antonis Minou	0	0	0	0	0	0	0	0
—	GK	(Greece) Spyros Ikonomopoulos	30	0	4	0	2	0	36	0
—	GK	(Greece) Fanis Kofinas	0	0	0	0	0	0	0	0
Defenders
—	DF	(Greece) Makis Chatzis	22	0	3	0	2	0	27	0
—	DF	(Greece) Takis Karagiozopoulos	3	1	0	0	0	0	3	1
—	DF	(Greece) Stelios Manolas	24	4	4	1	2	0	30	5
—	DF	(Greece) Giorgos Peppes	16	1	1	0	0	0	17	1
—	DF	(Greece) Christos Vasilopoulos	20	0	1	0	2	0	23	0
—	DF	(Greece) Georgios Koutoulas	28	0	4	0	2	0	34	0
—	DF	(Greece) Dimitris Volonakis	1	0	0	0	0	0	1	0
—	DF	(Greece) Michalis Karousis	0	0	0	0	0	0	0	0
Midfielders
—	MF	(Greece) Dimitris Pittas	22	2	2	1	2	1	26	4
—	MF	(Poland) Mirosław Okoński	30	11	3	0	2	0	35	11
—	MF	(Greece) Pavlos Papaioannou	24	0	4	0	1	0	29	0
—	MF	(Cyprus) Giorgos Savvidis	26	7	4	1	1	0	31	8
—	MF	(Greece) Lampros Georgiadis	17	0	2	0	0	0	19	0
—	MF	(Socialist Federal Republic of Yugoslavia) Toni Savevski	17	6	1	0	0	0	18	6
—	MF	(Australia) Jim Patikas	14	1	3	0	2	0	19	1
—	MF	(Greece) Stavros Stamatis	9	1	0	0	0	0	9	1
—	MF	(Greece) Giorgos Famelis	16	1	2	1	1	0	19	2
—	MF	(Greece) Charalampos Zarotiadis	1	0	1	0	0	0	2	0
—	MF	(Greece) Giorgos Papakostoulis	1	0	0	0	0	0	1	0
Forwards
—	FW	(Australia) Dimosthenis Batalis	10	1	0	0	0	0	10	1
—	FW	(Cyprus) Giannakis Ioannou	0	0	1	0	0	0	1	0
—	FW	(United States) Frank Klopas	7	1	0	0	0	0	7	1
—	FW	(Greece) Georgios Christodoulou	26	3	3	0	2	0	31	3
Left during Winter Transfer window
—	DF	(Greece) Polyvios Chatzopoulos	3	0	0	0	0	0	3	0
—	DF	(Greece) Sotiris Mavrodimos	5	0	2	1	2	0	9	1
—	DF	(Greece) Theodosis Kokotos	0	0	0	0	0	0	0	0
—	FW	(Greece) Giannis Dintsikos	2	0	2	0	0	0	4	0
—	FW	(Denmark) Henrik Nielsen	10	5	4	2	2	0	16	7
—	FW	(Greece) Michalis Manginas	1	0	0	0	0	0	1	0

=== Goalscorers ===
As of 21 May 1989
The list is sorted by competition order when total goals are equal, then by position and then alphabetically by surname.

Rank	Pos.	Player	Alpha Ethniki	Greek Cup	UEFA Cup	Total
1	MF	(Poland) Mirosław Okoński	11	0	0	11
2	MF	(Cyprus) Giorgos Savvidis	7	1	0	8
3	FW	(Denmark) Henrik Nielsen	5	2	0	7
4	MF	(Socialist Federal Republic of Yugoslavia) Toni Savevski	6	0	0	6
5	DF	(Greece) Stelios Manolas	4	1	0	5
6	MF	(Greece) Dimitris Pittas	2	1	1	4
7	FW	(Greece) Georgios Christodoulou	3	0	0	3
8	MF	(Greece) Giorgos Famelis	1	1	0	2
9	DF	(Greece) Takis Karagiozopoulos	1	0	0	1
9	DF	(Greece) Giorgos Peppes	1	0	0	1
9	MF	(Greece) Stavros Stamatis	1	0	0	1
9	MF	(Australia) Jim Patikas	1	0	0	1
9	FW	(Australia) Dimosthenis Batalis	1	0	0	1
9	FW	(United States) Frank Klopas	1	0	0	1
9	DF	(Greece) Sotiris Mavrodimos	0	1	0	1
Own goals			0	0	0	0
Totals			45	7	1	53

=== Clean sheets ===
As of 21 May 1989
The list is sorted by competition order when total clean sheets are equal and then alphabetically by surname. Clean sheets in games where both goalkeepers participated are awarded to the goalkeeper who started the game. Goalkeepers with no appearances are not included.

Rank	Player	Alpha Ethniki	Greek Cup	UEFA Cup	Total
1	(Greece) Spyros Ikonomopoulos	16	2	1	19
Totals		16	2	1	19

=== Disciplinary record ===
As of 21 May 1989

N	P	Nat.	Name	Alpha Ethniki			Greek Cup			European Cup			Total			Notes
N	P	Nat.	Name	Yellow card	Second yellow card	Red card	Yellow card	Second yellow card	Red card	Yellow card	Second yellow card	Red card	Yellow card	Second yellow card	Red card	Notes
Goalkeepers
—	GK	(Greece)	Antonis Minou													
—	GK	(Greece)	Spyros Ikonomopoulos													
—	GK	(Greece)	Fanis Kofinas													
Defenders
—	DF	(Greece)	Makis Chatzis	1		1							1		1	
—	DF	(Greece)	Takis Karagiozopoulos													
—	DF	(Greece)	Stelios Manolas	6	1		2						8	1		
—	DF	(Greece)	Giorgos Peppes	3		1							3		1	
—	DF	(Greece)	Christos Vasilopoulos	3		1							3		1	
—	DF	(Greece)	Georgios Koutoulas	1			1						2			
—	DF	(Greece)	Dimitris Volonakis													
—	DF	(Greece)	Michalis Karousis													
Midfielders
—	MF	(Greece)	Dimitris Pittas	4	1					1			5	1		
—	MF	(Poland)	Mirosław Okoński	1			1						2			
—	MF	(Greece)	Pavlos Papaioannou	7									7			
—	MF	(Cyprus)	Giorgos Savvidis	1									1			
—	MF	(Greece)	Lampros Georgiadis	2			1						3			
—	MF	(Socialist Federal Republic of Yugoslavia)	Toni Savevski	3									3			
—	MF	(Australia)	Jim Patikas	1									1			
—	MF	(Greece)	Stavros Stamatis	1									1			
—	MF	(Greece)	Giorgos Famelis							1			1			
—	MF	(Greece)	Charalampos Zarotiadis													
—	MF	(Greece)	Giorgos Papakostoulis													
Forwards
—	FW	(Australia)	Dimosthenis Batalis													
—	FW	(Cyprus)	Giannakis Ioannou													
—	FW	(United States)	Frank Klopas													
—	FW	(Greece)	Georgios Christodoulou													
Left during Winter Transfer window
—	DF	(Greece)	Polyvios Chatzopoulos													
—	DF	(Greece)	Sotiris Mavrodimos													
—	DF	(Greece)	Theodosis Kokotos													
—	FW	(Greece)	Giannis Dintsikos													
—	FW	(Denmark)	Henrik Nielsen	1									1			
—	FW	(Greece)	Michalis Manginas													

=== Starting 11 ===
This section presents the most frequently used formation along with the players with the most starts across all competitions.

N.	Formation	Matchday(s)
36	4–3–3	1–30

Nat.	Player	Pos.
(Greece)	Spyros Ikonomopoulos	GK
(Greece)	Stelios Manolas (C)	RCB
(Greece)	Georgios Koutoulas	LCB
(Greece)	Christos Vasilopoulos	RB
(Greece)	Makis Chatzis	LB
(Greece)	Pavlos Papaioannou	DM
(Greece)	Dimitris Pittas	RCM
(Socialist Federal Republic of Yugoslavia)	Toni Savevski	LCM
(Cyprus)	Giorgos Savvidis	RW
(Australia)	Jim Patikas	LW
(Poland)	Mirosław Okoński	CF

Last updated: 1989-05-21

== Awards ==
Player	Pos.	Award	Source
(Greece) Spyros Ikonomopoulos	GK	Greek Player of the Season	
