= Kalamaria =

Suburbs of the Thessaloniki Urban Area, Greece

Kalamaria Καλαμαριά
- Municipality
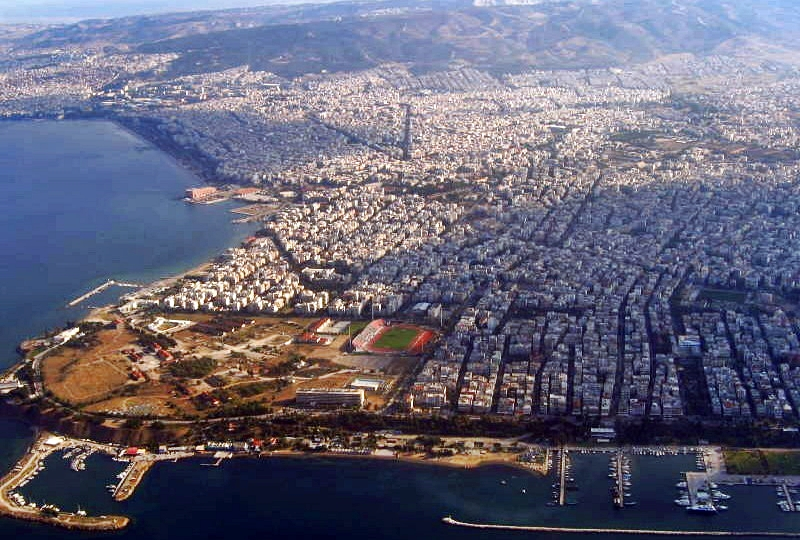
- Aerial photo of Kalamaria. The stadium of Apollon Kalamarias and the marina of Aretsou are visible.

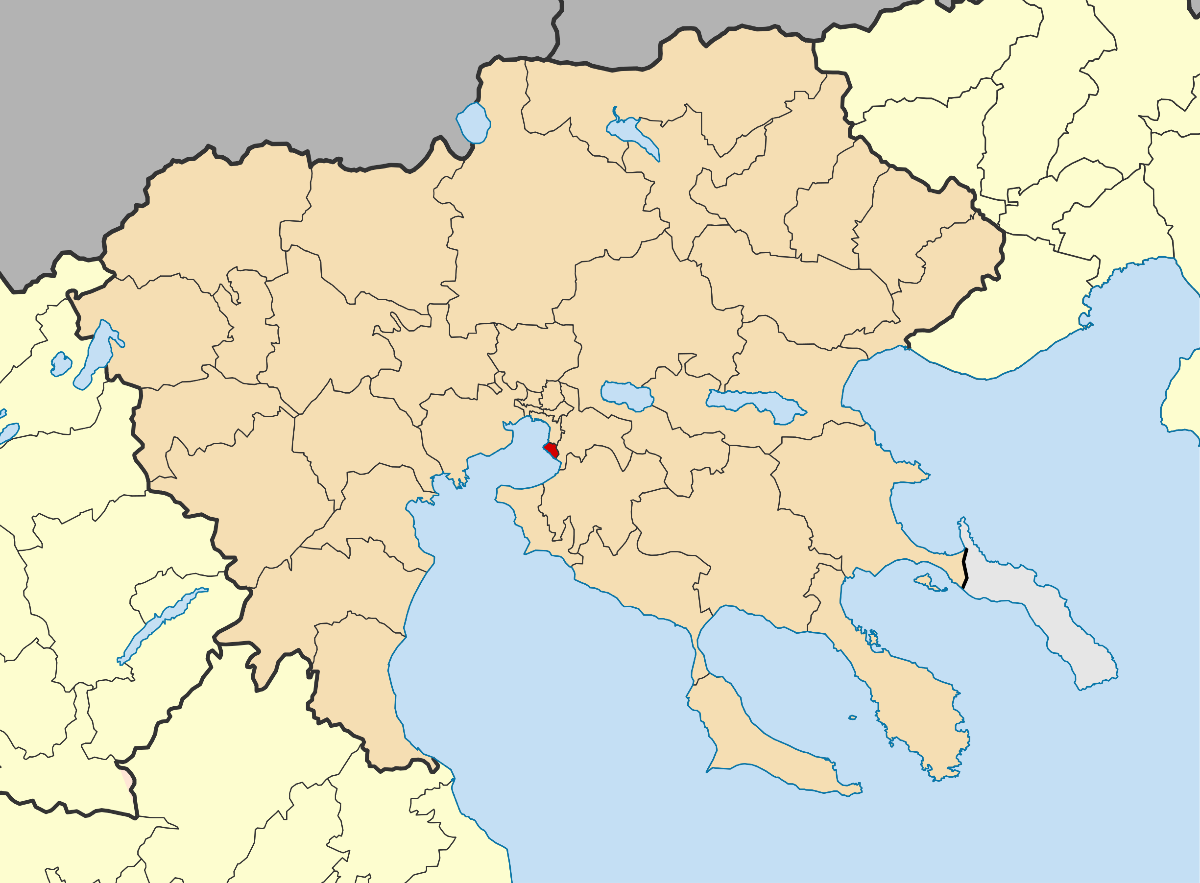

- Location within Greece
- Coordinates: 40°35′N 22°57′E
- Country: Greece
- Geographic region: Macedonia
- Administrative region: Central Macedonia
- Regional unit: Thessaloniki

Government
  - Mayor: Chrysa Arapoglou (since 2023)

Area
  - Municipality: 6.40 km^{2} (2.47 sq mi)
- Elevation: 35 m (115 ft)

Population (2021)
  - Municipality: 92,248
  - Density: 14,400/km^{2} (37,300/sq mi)
- Time zone: UTC+2 (EET)
  - Summer (DST): UTC+3 (EEST)
- Postal code: 551 xx
- Area code: +30231
- Vehicle registration: N
- Website: www.kalamaria.gr http://politismos.kalamaria.gr/

Kalamaria (Greek: Καλαμαριά, Port Side) is among the most densely populated suburbs of Thessaloniki, Greece, located about 7 kilometres (4 miles) southeast of the downtown area, with a population of 92,248.

== Name ==
Contrary to popular belief, and despite its history as a fishing community, its name is unrelated to the Greek word for squid, "kalamari". The name Kalamaria first appears in 1083 to denote the area southeast of Thessaloniki, including but not limited to the area of the present-day municipality. It comes from a corruption of the phrase "Skalas meria" (literally "port side"), denoting the harbor or pier in which the local fleet was stationed, as part of the Byzantine theme of Thessalonica.

== History ==
The area was first settled by humans in prehistoric times, and remains from that settlement have been found around the Mikro Emvolo cape. During the Byzantine and the Ottoman periods, the area was mostly uninhabited, except for a few fishing lodges. As part of Ottoman rule in Greece, the area was part of a nahiye, which included the christian villages of Vasilika, Epanomi, and Trilofo and a number of muslim villages, which are nowadays called Simantra, Plagiari, Mesimeri and Raidestos.

During the XIX century the area was inhabited mostly by Bulgarians from the Debar region. In the early 1920s Asia Minor refugees from the Greek diaspora in Georgia and Asia Minor settled because they either fled or were forcibly sent to Greece as a result of the Greco-Turkish War. As many as 100,000 refugees relocated to Thessaloniki, primarily to the city's suburbs. Refugees from Asia Minor and East Thrace mainly settled in Kalamaria.

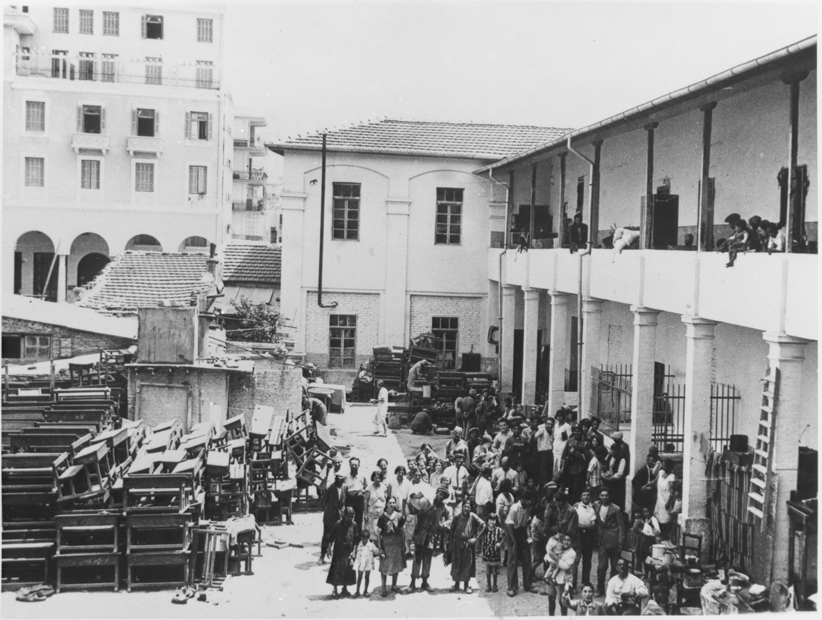
Families homeless following the Campbell pogrom (Campbell was located in nowadays Kalamaria) of 1931. Photo taken somewhere near Aristotelous square.

In 1931, an antisemitic riot, led by National Union of Greece, took place in Camp Campbell, located in nowadays Kalamaria, where a Jewish neighborhood was completely burned, leaving 500 families homeless and one Jewish resident dead.

Kalamaria has seen substantial recent growth as part of a population shift from rural and urban areas to suburban areas, particularly to those east of Thessaloniki. Between the 1981 and 2001 censuses, the population of Kalamaria grew by about 36,000 (or 69%). Up until 1943 Kalamaria was part of the Municipality of Thessaloniki. On 1 January 1943 it became an independent administrative unit.

Kalamaria had a population of 14,000 residents as recorded by an inventory in 1947, but this has considerably increased, as shown by the Greek census of 2001 where Kalamaria had a total of 87,255 residents. Kalamaria has the second highest population in the Council of the Town Planning Group of Thessaloniki but also of Northern Greece and ninth in all of Greece.

Though it was originally separated from the main City of Thessaloniki, the municipality has grown so much in the post-war period that the older physical boundaries are virtually non-existent. Nowadays, the border between the two municipalities exists purely for administrative purposes.

Traditionally the areas of Krini and Aretsou had been used as beaches and places for summer baths for the citizens of Thessaloniki, after WWII until the 1980s. The pollution of the Thermaic Gulf made this practice impossible since then.

The total area of the Municipality of Kalamaria covers 6.401 square kilometres (2.47 square miles). About two thirds of the perimeter are 6.5 kilometres (4.0 miles) of coastline. The municipality is separated into 10 geographical districts, which have been given names reminiscent of the refugees' former homelands.

- Nea Krini (Νέα Κρήνη)
- Karabournaki (Καραμπουρνάκι)
- Nea Touzla (Νέα Τούζλα)
- Kouri (Κουρί)
- Katirli (Κατιρλί)
- Aretsou (Αρετσού)
- Agios Ioannis (Άγιος Ιωάννης)
- Vyzantio (Βυζάντιο)
- Agios Panteleimonas (Άγιος Παντελεήμoνας)
- Navarchos Votsis (Ναύαρχος Βότσης, "Admiral Votsis")
- Finikas (Fenekas in local language) (Φοίνικας)

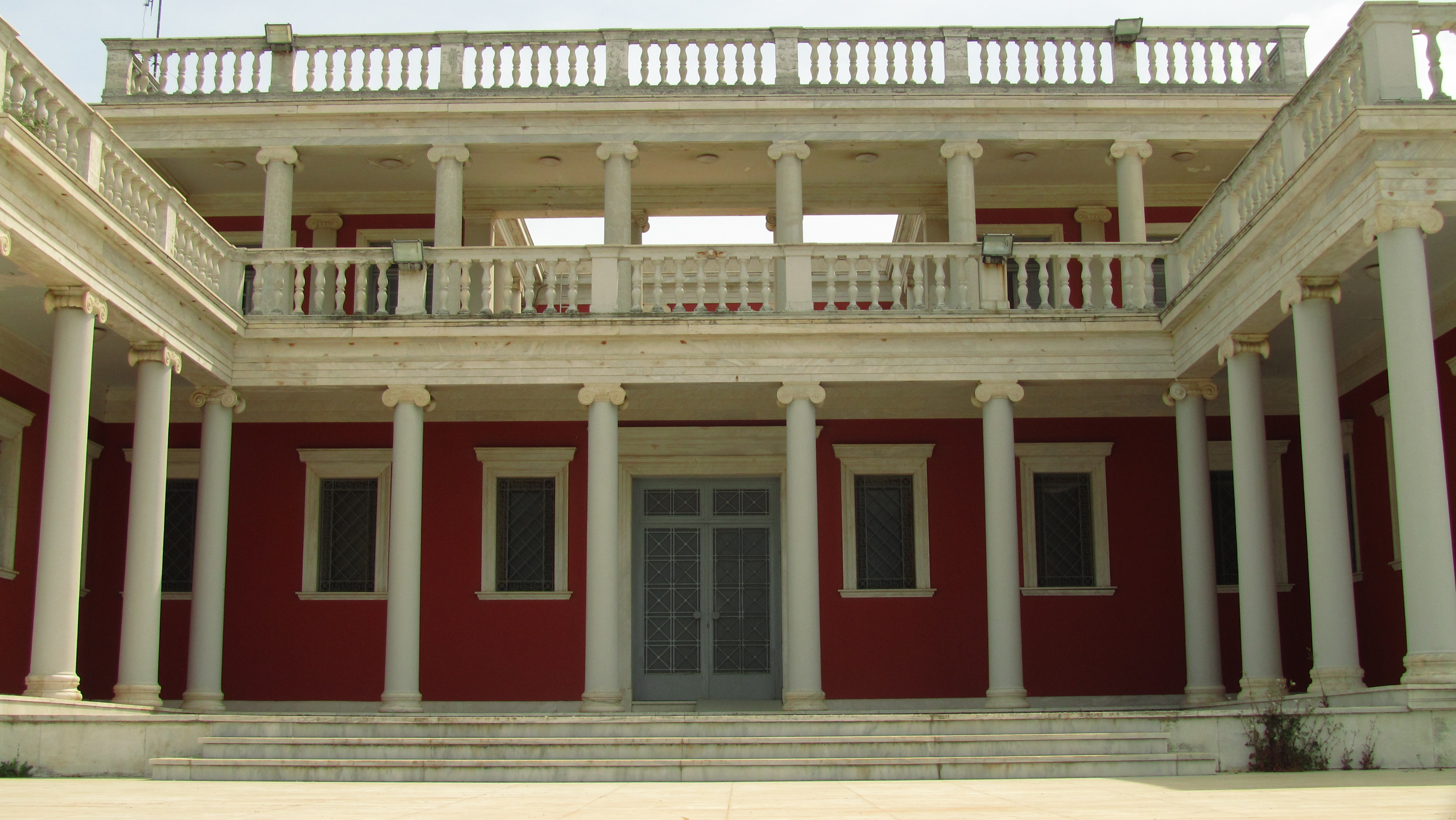
View of the Palataki

== Historical population ==
Year	Population
1981	51,676
1991	80,698
2001	87,255
2011	91,279
2021	92,248

== Sporting teams ==
Kalamaria has in total 14 sporting teams including Apollon Kalamarias.

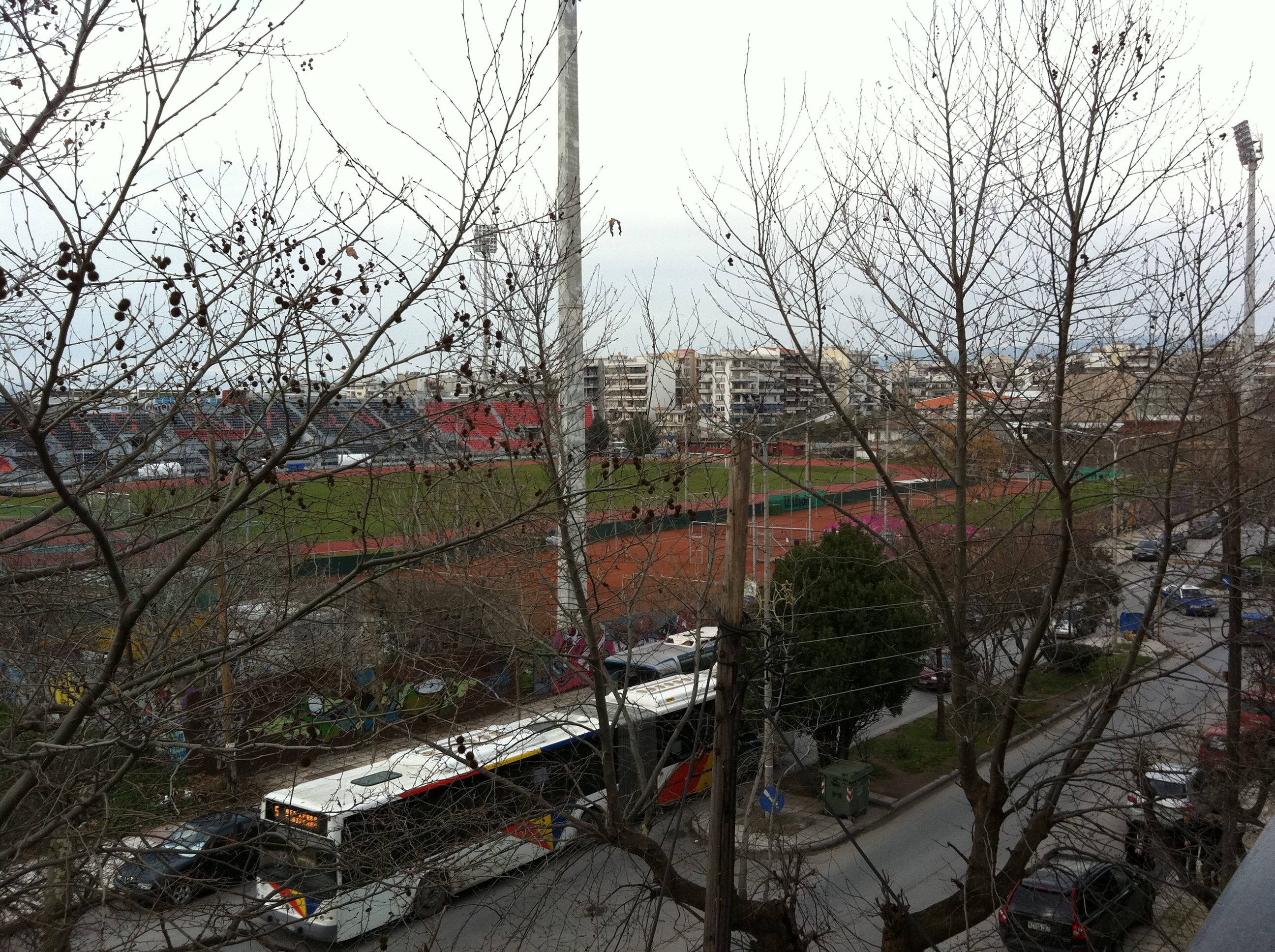
Apollon Kalamarias Stadium

== Climate ==
Kalamaria, like much of Thessaloniki metropolitan area lies in a transitional climate zone between semi-arid and temperate climates, classifying as cold semi-arid climate (BSk) according to Köppen climate classification. Kalamaria records 408 mm annual precipitation, evenly spread throughout the year with a slight decrease during the summer months, while the average annual temperature is 17.1 °C. Temperatures in the warmest months rarely (if ever) exceed 40 °C while frost may occur several days per year during the winter months. Thunderstorms are more common during the warmer half of the year. Snowfall is not very common though it occurs almost annually, but it usually does not cause heavy disruption to daily life.

Climate data for Kalamaria 2009–2019
Month	Jan	Feb	Mar	Apr	May	Jun	Jul	Aug	Sep	Oct	Nov	Dec	Year
Mean daily maximum °C (°F)	9.7 (49.5)	12.6 (54.7)	15.5 (59.9)	20.4 (68.7)	25.7 (78.3)	30.2 (86.4)	32.3 (90.1)	32.3 (90.1)	27.7 (81.9)	21.9 (71.4)	16.9 (62.4)	11.3 (52.3)	21.4 (70.5)
Daily mean °C (°F)	6.5 (43.7)	9.1 (48.4)	11.3 (52.3)	15.4 (59.7)	20.4 (68.7)	24.9 (76.8)	27.2 (81.0)	27.3 (81.1)	23.0 (73.4)	17.8 (64.0)	13.6 (56.5)	8.1 (46.6)	17.1 (62.7)
Mean daily minimum °C (°F)	3.8 (38.8)	6.2 (43.2)	8.0 (46.4)	11.3 (52.3)	16.1 (61.0)	20.5 (68.9)	22.8 (73.0)	22.9 (73.2)	19.1 (66.4)	14.6 (58.3)	11.0 (51.8)	5.3 (41.5)	13.5 (56.2)
Average precipitation mm (inches)	30 (1.2)	39 (1.5)	49 (1.9)	28 (1.1)	32 (1.3)	36 (1.4)	32 (1.3)	17 (0.7)	37 (1.5)	33 (1.3)	38 (1.5)	37 (1.5)	408 (16.2)
Source: National Observatory of Athens

== Transportation ==
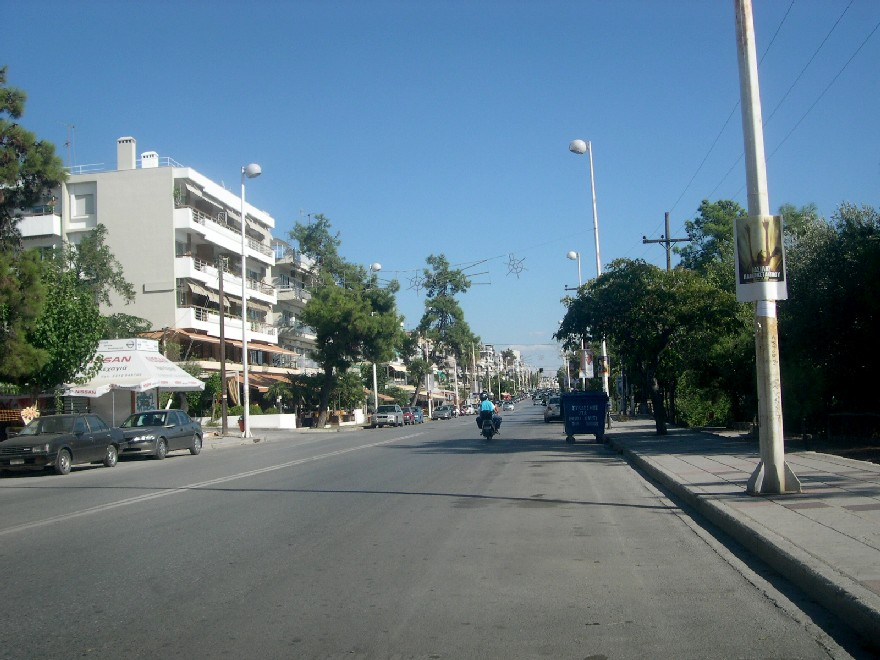
Nea Krini seafront

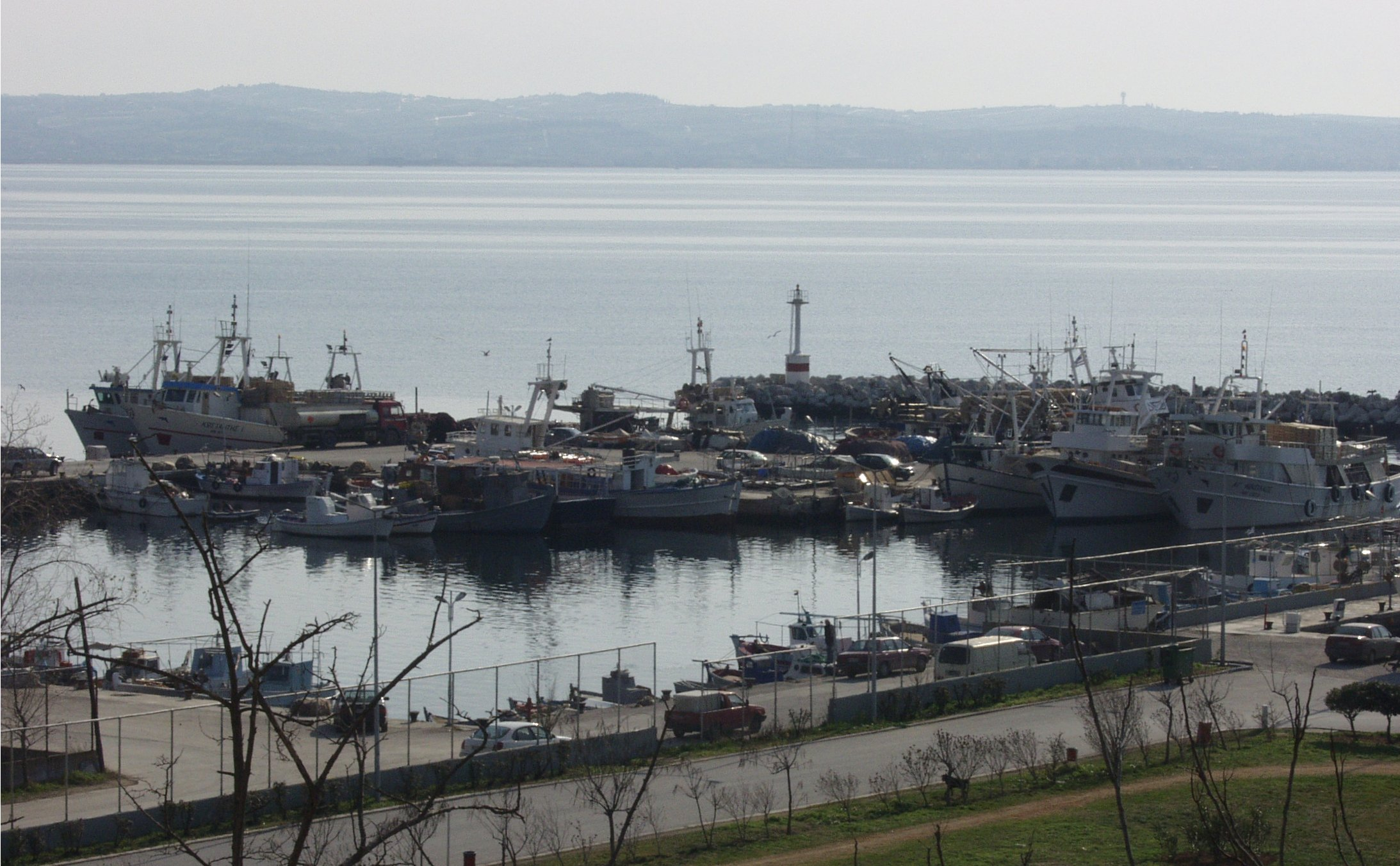
Marina of Aretsou

The main roads that feed into the municipality are those of Konstantinos Karamanlis Avenue (formerly Nea Egnatia) to the east (which links with the A25 (the Thessaloniki-Chalkidiki motorway)), Taki Ekonomidi Avenue (which links the popular district of Nea Krini with Thessaloniki's city center), Megalou Alexandrou Avenue - the biggest avenue in Thessaloniki and the EO16 which provides the main access from Kalamaria to the airport and the outer south-eastern suburbs of Thessaloniki. Other main road links exist with Thermi, while the southeast end of the Thessaloniki ring road (which bypasses the Thessaloniki Urban Area) lies to the southeast of Kalamaria.

The first extension of the Thessaloniki Metro passes through Kalamaria, consisting of a 4.78 km line and the stations of Nomarchia, Kalamaria, Aretsou, Nea Krini and Mikra, the first two of which will serve the centre of the municipality. The extension of the Thessaloniki Metro to Kalamaria is one of the most important infrastructure projects for the wider region, improving transport conditions and enhancing sustainable mobility by serving 63,000 passengers daily and reducing daily traffic by 12,000 cars, eliminating 43 tons of daily CO_{2} emissions. The project was completed and given to passenger use in August 2026.

== Streets ==
- Chilis Street
- Plastira Street
- Passalidi Street
- Sofouli Street
- Ethnikis Antistaseos Street
- Kerasountos Street
- Mitropolitou Kallidou Street
- Komninon Street
- Karamanli Street
- Venizelou Street
- Korai Street

- Vrioulon Street
- Sarafi Street
- Smirnis Street
- Papagou Street
- Fleming Street
- Taki Ikonomidi Street
- Panormou Street
- Andrea Papandreou Street
- Propontidos Street
- Kountourioti Street

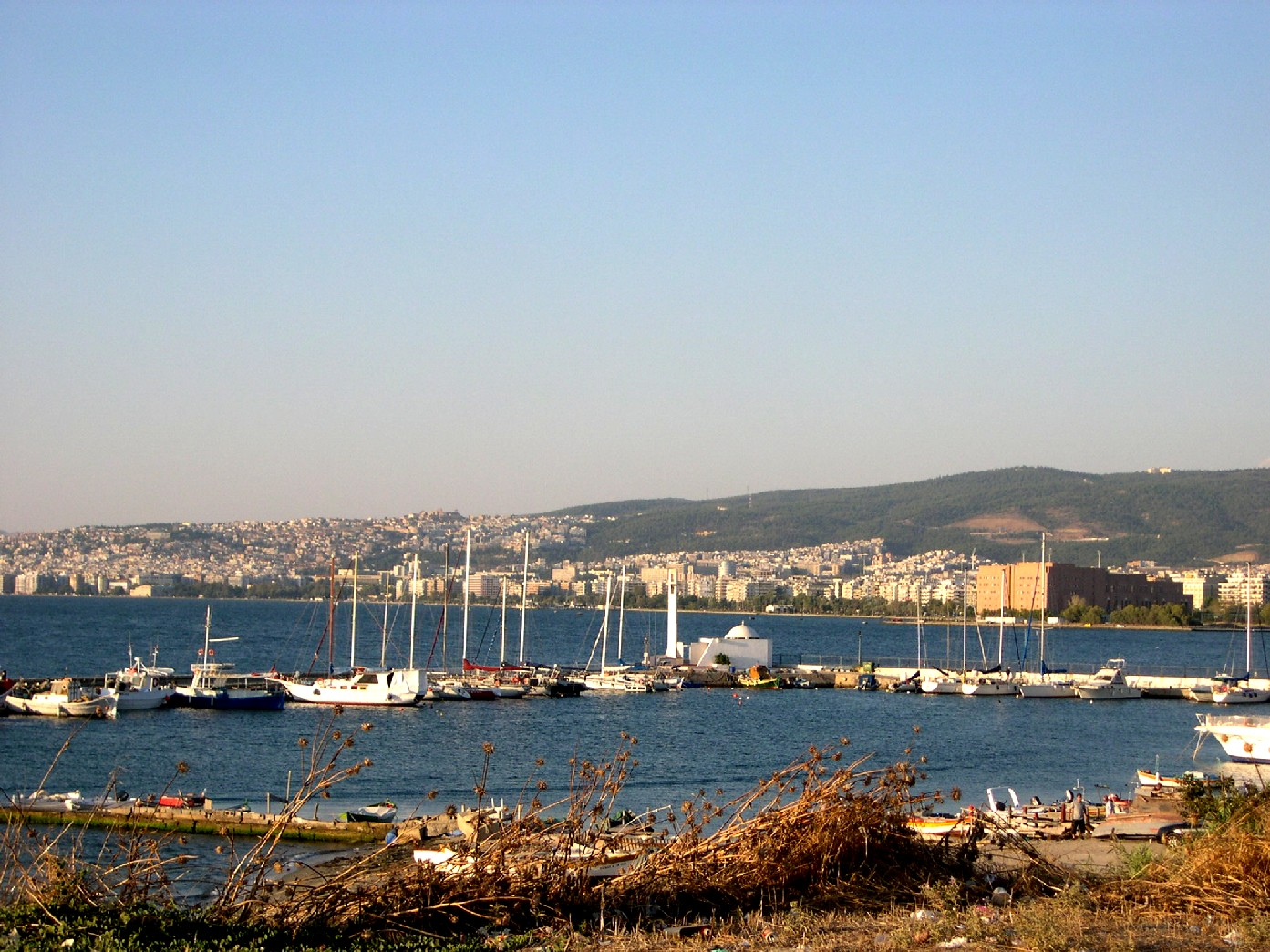
View of downtown Thessaloniki from Karabournaki. The Thessaloniki Concert Hall is visible

== International relations ==
=== Twin towns — Sister cities ===
Kalamaria is twinned with:

- Saranda, Albania
- Dimitrovgrad, Bulgaria
- Paphos, Cyprus
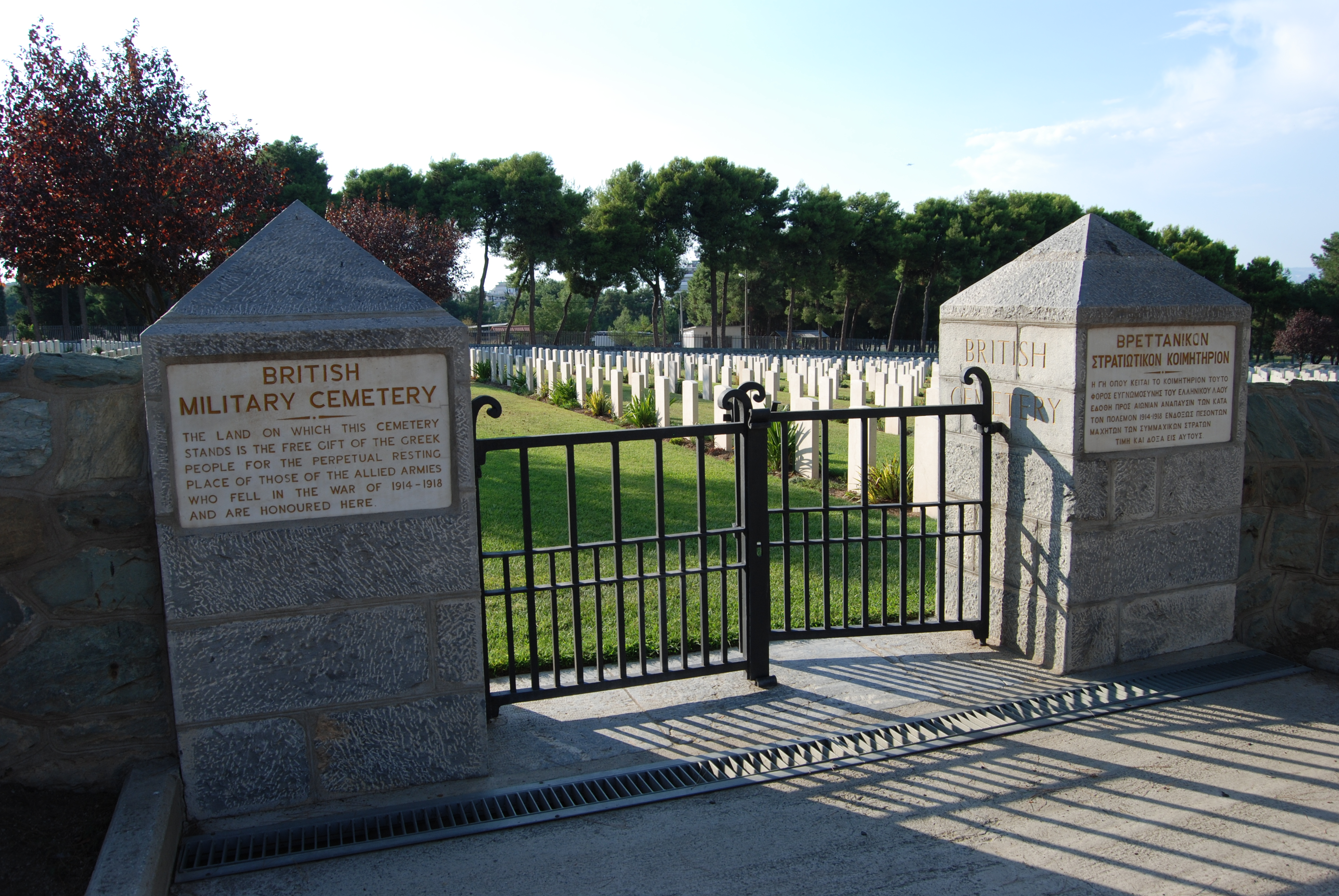
- Mikra British Cemetery
  Clearwater, Florida, United States
- Liptovský Mikuláš, Slovakia

Partnerships

In addition to this, Kalamaria is partnered with:

- Solna, Sweden
- Fonyód, Hungary

== See also ==
- List of settlements in the Thessaloniki regional unit
