= List of Thessaloniki Metro stations =

This is a list of Thessaloniki Metro stations. 18 stations are currently operating, while 27 stations are planned for future extensions of the network.

== Stations in service ==
#	Name			Opening date	Line(s)	Other Connections
#	English	Greek	Literal	Opening date	Line(s)	Other Connections
1	25 Martiou	25ης Μαρτίου	25th of March	2024	Thessaloniki Metro Line 1 Thessaloniki Metro Line 2	
2	Agias Sofias	Αγίας Σοφίας	Hagia Sophia	2024	Thessaloniki Metro Line 1 Thessaloniki Metro Line 2	
3	Analipsi	Ανάληψη	Ascension	2024	Thessaloniki Metro Line 1 Thessaloniki Metro Line 2	
4	Aretsou	Aρετσού	Nea Aretsou	2026	Thessaloniki Metro Line 2	
5	Dimokratias (Note: In the original 1987 plan, this station was named Βαρδάρι (Vardari), the old name of Dimokratias Square, named after the Vardari Fort and the associated gate on the Walls of Thessaloniki leading to the Vardar river (Axios in Greek). The name was changed because it is not of Greek origin.)	Δημοκρατίας	Democracy Square	2024	Thessaloniki Metro Line 1 Thessaloniki Metro Line 2	
6	Efkleidis (Note: In the original 1987 proposal, this station was named Αρχαιολογικού Μουσείου (Archaiologikou Mouseiou), named after the Yeni Mosque, which became the city's first archaeological museum in 1925.)	Ευκλείδης	Euclid	2024	Thessaloniki Metro Line 1 Thessaloniki Metro Line 2	
7	Fleming	Φλέμινγκ	Fleming Street	2024	Thessaloniki Metro Line 1 Thessaloniki Metro Line 2	
8	Kalamaria	Καλαμαριά	Kalamaria	2026	Thessaloniki Metro Line 2	
9	Mikra	Μίκρα	Mikra	2026	Thessaloniki Metro Line 2	Shuttle to Airport
10	Nea Elvetia	Νέα Ελβετία	New Switzerland	2024	Thessaloniki Metro Line 1	Shuttle to Airport
11	Nea Krini	Νέα Κρήνη	New Spring	2026	Thessaloniki Metro Line 2	
12	New Railway Station (Note: During construction, the station name in English was a transliteration rather than a translation of the Greek name: Neos Sidirodromikos Stathmos or Neos Sid. Stathmos.)	Νέος Σιδ. Σταθμός	New Railway Station	2024	Thessaloniki Metro Line 1 Thessaloniki Metro Line 2	Proastiakos, and Hellenic Railways
13	Nomarchia	Νομαρχία	Prefectural Administration	2026	Thessaloniki Metro Line 2	
14	Panepistimio	Πανεπιστήμιο	University	2024	Thessaloniki Metro Line 1 Thessaloniki Metro Line 2	
15	Papafi	Παπάφη	Papafis Street	2024	Thessaloniki Metro Line 1 Thessaloniki Metro Line 2	
16	Sintrivani (Note: Prior to 2022, this station was named Sintrivani/Ekthesi (Fountain/Exposition). It was called Syntrivani in the 1987 proposal.)	Σιντριβάνι	Fountain (Note: This refers to a local landmark, a marble fountain donated to the Thessalonians by the Ottoman Sultan Abdul Hamid II in 1889.)	2024	Thessaloniki Metro Line 1 Thessaloniki Metro Line 2	
17	Venizelou (Note: In the original 1987 plan, this station was named Αλκαζάρ (Alkazar), the name used for the Hamza Bey Mosque immediately above the station, when it was used as a cinema.)	Βενιζέλου	Venizelos Street	2024	Thessaloniki Metro Line 1 Thessaloniki Metro Line 2	
18	Voulgari	Βούλγαρη	Voulgaris Street	2024	Thessaloniki Metro Line 1	

== Future stations ==
The immediate expansion plans call for an extension of Line 1 from the New Railway Station towards Thessaloniki's western suburbs:

- Neapoli
- Terpsithea
- Stavroupoli
- Polichni
- Efkarpia
- Papageorgiou Hospital

A secondary expansion is planned towards the airport and the new Thessaloniki Innovation and Technology Centre (ThessINTEC). This line is to be in a tunnel for a short distance, then at-grade, and then elevated (grade-separated):

- Anotera Scholi Polemou
- Patriarchiko
- Diavalkaniko
- Georgiki Scholi
- Thessaloniki Airport
- ThessINTEC

A future branching of the airport extension towards Thermi is also accounted for.

A Line 3 is being considered, to run from Toumba towards the western sububrbs, intersecting with lines 1 and 2 at Panepistimio and the New Railway Station, and possibly also at Dimokratias:

- Agia Kyriaki
- Charilaou
- Toumba
- Agiou Dimitriou
- Panepistimio
- HANTH
- Aristotelous
- Dimokratias (?)
- New Railway Station
- Ampelokipoi
- KTEL Makedonia
- Eptanisou
- Kordelio
- Menemeni
- Evosmos
- Perifereiaki
- Ano Evosmos

== See also ==
- List of Athens Metro stations
- Line 1 (Thessaloniki Metro)
- Line 2 (Thessaloniki Metro)
- Thessaloniki Metro
