= Kalamaria Stadium =

Multi-purpose stadium in Kalamaria, Thessaloniki, Greece

Coordinates: 40°34′53.31″N 22°56′42.41″E

Apollon Kalamaria Stadium
- Kalamaria Stadium
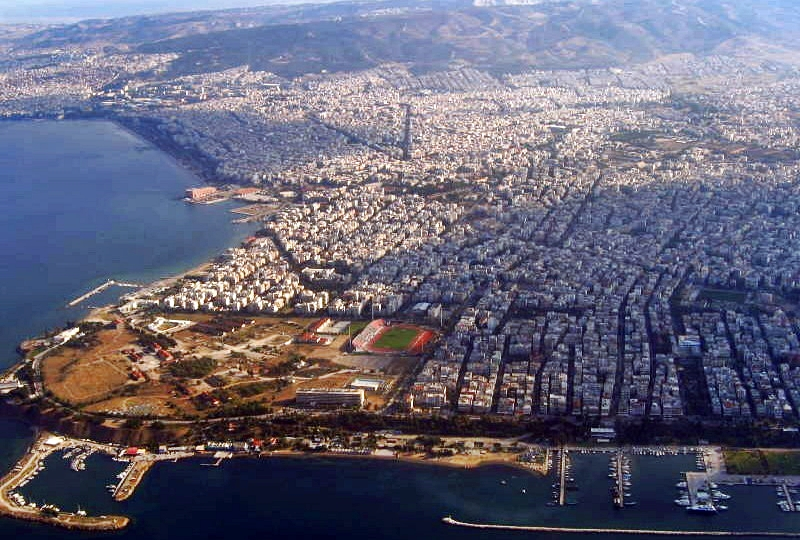
- Aerial view of Kalamaria with the stadium in the center
- Interactive map of Apollon Kalamaria Stadium
- Location: Kalamaria, Thessaloniki, Greece
- Operator: Apollon Kalamarias F.C.
- Capacity: 6,500
- Surface: Grass
- Public transit: Kalamaria

Construction
- Built: 1973

Tenant
- Apollon Kalamarias F.C.

Kalamaria Stadium is a multi-purpose stadium in Kalamaria, a district of Thessaloniki, in Greece.

It is currently used mostly for football matches and is the home stadium of Apollon Kalamarias.

The stadium was built in 1973; renovations were made in 2003, prior to the 2004 Summer Olympics, as the stadium was used as one of the official training venues for the Olympics' football competition.

The stadium's capacity is 6,500.

In terms of events, artist Anna Vissi currently holds the record of most widely attended concert, attracting over 23,000 fans.
