= Mikro Emvolo =

Cape in Kalamaria, Thessaloniki, Greece

Coordinates: 40.583°N 22.940°E

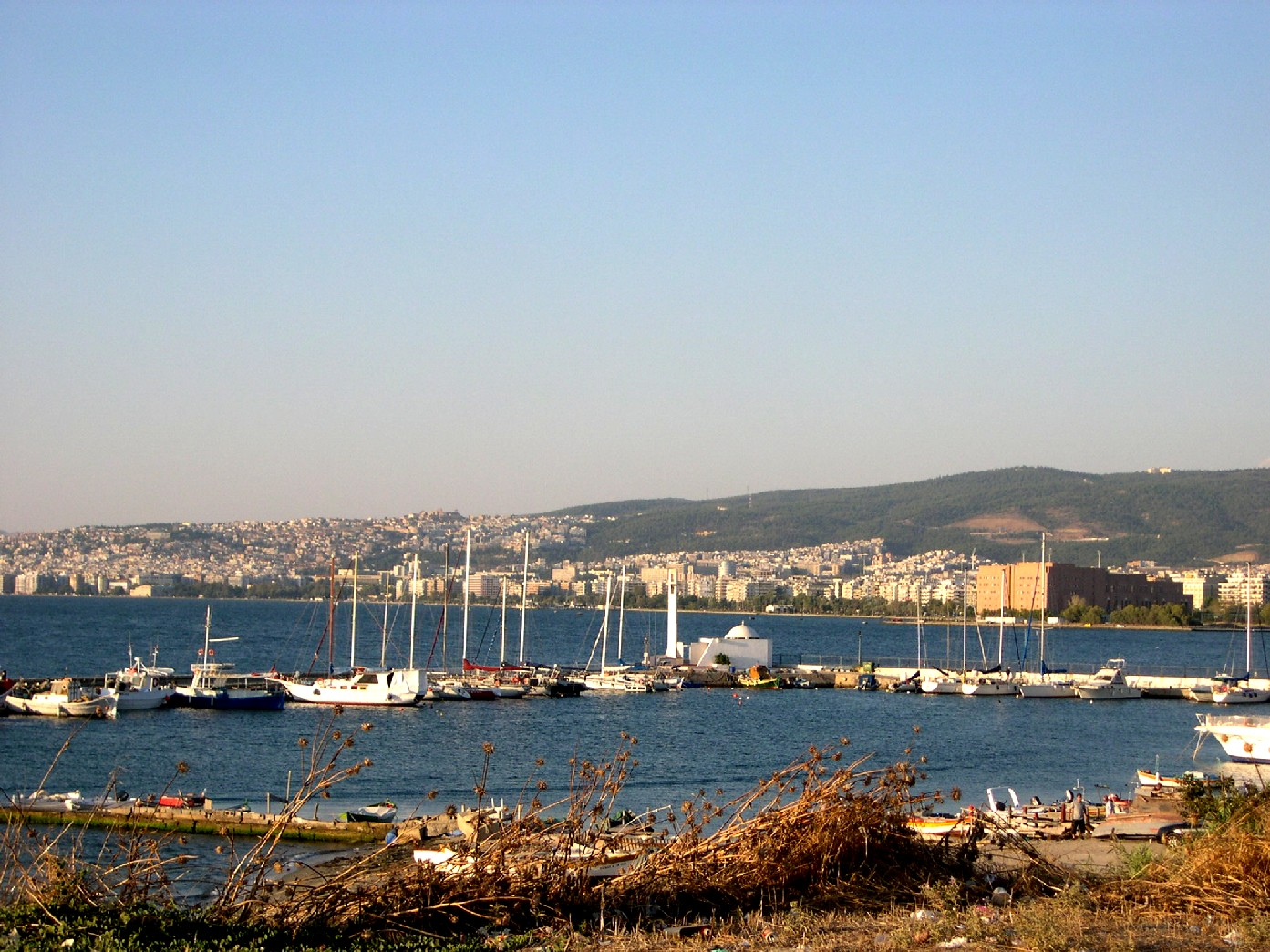
View from Karabournaki.

Mikro Emvolo (Greek: Μικρό Έμβολο), also called Karabournaki (Καραμπουρνάκι), is the cape of Kalamaria in northeastern Thessaloniki and a district of the local municipality. Its name comes from kara burun in Turkish, meaning 'black peninsula'. + Greek -aki (diminutive).

== Former Kodra Barracks ==
An excavation site, believing to possibly be the ancient city of Therma (located in the area before the founding of Thessaloniki), is situated within the former Kodras Barracks which occupy a large part of the cape. The former barracks grounds belong to this day to the Ministry of National Defence and are being claimed by the municipal government to be turned over to the local community, and redeveloped into a large metropolitan park for the whole city.

== The district ==
Karabournaki, has two major streets: Themistokli Sofouli street which from Thessaloniki's Concert Hall leads to Nea Krini and Taki Ekonomidi avenue, which links the center of Kalamaria to downtown Thessaloniki. The most significant building of Karabournaki is the so-called Kyvernion (Government House) also known as the "Palataki" (little palace); which was the official residence of the King and Queen of Greece during their visits in Thessaloniki. Moreover, many Greek Presidents as well as other important personalities that have visited, have stayed there.
