= Trilofo =

Trilofo may refer to several places in Greece:

- Trilofo, Arcadia, a village in the municipality of Megalopoli, Arcadia
- Trilofo, Imathia, a village in the municipal unit of Dovras, Imathia
- Trilofo, Phthiotis, a village in the municipal unit of Makrakomi, Phthiotis
- Trilofo, Pieria, a village in the municipal unit of Elafina, Pieria
- Trilofos, a village in the municipal unit of Thermi, Thessaloniki regional unit
