= Michalis Arkadis =

Greek businessman

24th president of AEK Athens
- In office 15 June 1982 – 19 June 1983
- Preceded by: Andreas Zafiropoulos
- Succeeded by: Lefteris Panagidis

Personal details
- Born: 4 October 1937 Oinousses, Greece
- Died: 10 May 1990 (aged 52)
- Children: Angeliki Arkadis; Nikolaos Arkadis
- Occupation: Businessman; Shipping
- Known for: President of AEK Athens F.C.

Michalis Arkadis (Greek: Μιχάλης Αρκάδης; 4 October 1937 – 20 May 1990) was a Greek shipowner and a football official, who served as president of AEK Athens.

== Early life ==
Arkadis had studied maritime science at the University of Southampton and was a successful shipowner based in Piraeus.

== AEK Athens ==
He was actively involved with AEK since the early 1970's and was a member of many boards of directors under the presidency of Loukas Barlos. In the 1982–83 season, when the then owner of AEK, Andreas Zafiropoulos stepped down from the presidency of the club, Arkadis he took over as president of AEK. During his presidency, he hired Helmut Senekowitsch as coach and won the Greek Cup in 1983. In the summer of the same year since he was unable to respond financially in the contract renewal of the team's star, Thomas Mavros he resigned in order for the new president, Lefteris Panagidis takes over.

== Personal life ==
His daughter, Angeliki is the general manager of AEK and his son is Nikolaos is Insurance and Financial Broker.

== Death ==
Arkadis died suddenly on the 20 May 1990, at the age of 52, from an acute heart attack at Rizoupoli Stadium, a few minutes before the start of the match of AEK Athens against Apollon Athens, which he was preparing to watch.
