= Dimitris Pittas =

Greek footballer (born 1958)

Personal information
- Full name: Dimitrios Pittas
- Date of birth: 8 April 1958 (age 68)
- Place of birth: Athens, Greece
- Height: 1.80 m (5 ft 11 in)
- Position: Midfielder

Youth career
- 1974–1978: GS Patision

Senior career*
Years	Team	Apps	(Gls)
1978–1981	Korinthos	66	(18)
1981–1985	Ethnikos Piraeus	120	(24)
1985–1986	PAOK	27	(1)
1986–1989	AEK Athens	43	(4)
1989–1992	E.A. Rethymniakou		
Total		256	(47)

International career
1976–1977	Greece U18		
1977	Greece Amateur		
1982–1997	Greece Military		
- * Club domestic league appearances and goals

Dimitris Pittas (Greek: Δημήτρης Πίττας; born 8 April 1958) is a Greek former professional footballer who played as midfielder.

== Club career ==
Pittas started playing football as an amateur at GS Patision in 1974. He won the local championship and he also became an international with the youth team in 1976. Two years later he moved to Korinthos, where he played for three seasons and in 1979 he won the second division at their group, as well as the promotion to the first division.

On 22 July 1981 Pittas signed for Ethnikos Piraeus. He played at the club for four seasons and his performances attracted the interest of the big clubs. In 1985, Pittas was transferred to the PAOK and played at the club of Thessaloniki until 1986.

On 12 December 1986, Pittas moved to AEK Athens. There he performed quite well, helping the team with his technique and strong shot. On 24 January 1988, in a match against PAOK and while the score was at 0–0, at the 30th minute AEK won an indirect foul from quite a long distance and Pittas had not seen the gesture of the referee for an indirect foul, he executed directly with the ball hitting the goalkeeper's hand and ending up in the net. If the goalkeeper had let the ball go straight to the net, the goal would not count. PAOK objected, asking for the replay of the match, but the objection fell on deaf ears. As he revealed, when the players and the referee were returning after the goal for the continuation of the match, the referee angrily addressed him, asking him if he was trying to end his refereeing career. On 7 September 1988, he scored the winner with a header against Athletic Bilbao for the UEFA Cup. He distinguished himself quite a bit in the yellow-blacks, actively participating in winning the league in 1989. Additionally, he won a bet of 500,000 drachmas from his teammate, Stelios Manolas, betting on AEK winning the championship in the end of the season, where Manolas did not expect that AEK would succeed and naturally lost the bet. He was released from AEK in the summer of 1989 in bad condition, having complaints mainly from the president of the club, Stratos Gidopoulos, as well as the manager, Dušan Bajević, for not renewing his contract. At the same time, the administration owed him money, making an appeal and staying out of football for months.

Afterwards, Pittas signed for E.A. Rethymniakou, where he played for 3 seasons in the second division, before ending his career in 1992.

== International career ==
Pittas was called in Greece U18 in 1976 where he got to play to the final stage of the European Championship in 1977. In 1977 he was also called to the national amateur team, where he played in the qualification stage of the UEFA Amateur Cup, where Greece qualified undefeated and eventually lost the trophy at the final, in Karaiskakis Stadium, to Yugoslavia.

== After football ==
He has been a police officer since 1982 for years he was also the leader of the Greek military team, while after the end of his career he also involved in coaching at an amateur level.

== Honours ==
AEK Athens

- Alpha Ethniki: 1988–89

Korinthos

- Beta Ethniki: 1978–79 (South Group)
