= Henrik Nielsen (footballer, born 1965) =

Danish footballer (born 1965)

Personal information
- Full name: Henrik Hegelund Nielsen
- Date of birth: 29 March 1965 (age 60)
- Place of birth: Virum, Denmark
- Height: 1.89 m (6 ft 2 in)
- Position: Striker

Senior career*
Years	Team	Apps	(Gls)
1984–1987	B93		(34)
1987–1988	AEK Athens	40	(26)
1988–1989	Iraklis	14	(1)
1989–1990	Fenerbahçe	19	(5)
1990	B 1903	2	(0)
1990–1992	Lille	30	(9)
1992	Brøndby	8	(2)
- * Club domestic league appearances and goals

Henrik Nielsen (born 29 March 1965) is a Danish former professional footballer who played as a striker.

== Career ==
Nielsen started his football career in the Danish 2nd Division, playing for B93. In the summer of 1987, he was scouted by the manager of AEK Athens, Todor Veselinović, who convinced the club's president, Andreas Zafiropoulos in signing him. Thus on 14 July he was transferred to the Greek club for a fee of 7 million drachmas.

In Greece, he was nicknamed "The Copenhagen doll" and initially resembled in terms of appearance his predecessor in the offense at AEK, Håkan Sandberg. Nielsen immediately adjusted to the team and showed his scoring ability, scoring goals in every way. As a result of his performance, at the end of the season he emerged as the top scorer of the Alpha Ethniki with 21 goals, while he was much loved by the fans of AEK. On 6 December 1987 he scored four goals in a 7–1 win at home against Veria. The following season everything changed, as the new manager of the club, Dušan Bajević showed that he did not trust him that much. As a result, Nielsen was sometimes played as a starter, but he was also left at the bench as a back-up choice. Eventually, in December 1988, Bajevic and the club's president, Gidopoulos decided to let him leave the club, as they were full at the foreigners' slots. It was a decision that certainly caused surprise, but the choices of the manager were generally justifyed, since AEK won the championship at the end of the season.

On 15 December, Nielsen was transferred to Iraklis for a fee of 30 million drachmas, where he played for the rest of the season. In the summer of 1989 he left Greece and signed for Fenerbahçe, where he won the Turkish Cup and the President Cup in 1990. Afterwards, he played for B 1903 for a few months. He later spent two seasons with Lille. Nielsen ended his career in 1992, due to an injury, playing in the Danish 2nd Division with Brøndby.

== Personal life ==
Nielsen lives in Copenhagen with his wife and has five daughters. They successfully run a wine production business.

== Honours ==
AEK Athens

- Alpha Ethniki: 1988–89

Fenerbahçe

- Turkish Cup: 1989–90
- President Cup: 1990

Individual

- Alpha Ethniki top scorer: 1987–88
