= Ano Scholari =

Ano Scholari Άνω Σχολάρι
- Settlement
- Location within Greece
- Coordinates: 40°28′N 23°0.15′E
- Country: Greece
- Administrative region: Central Macedonia
- Regional unit: Thessaloniki
- Municipality: Thermi
- Municipal unit: Mikra
- Community: Trilofo
- Elevation: 170 m (560 ft)

Population (2021)
  - Total: 170
- Time zone: UTC+2 (EET)
  - Summer (DST): UTC+3 (EEST)
- Postal code: 575 00
- Area code: +30-2392
- Vehicle registration: NA to NX

Ano Scholari (Greek: Άνω Σχολάρι) is a village of the Thermi municipality. Before the 2011 local government reform it was part of the municipality of Mikra. The 2021 census recorded 170 inhabitants in the village. Ano Scholari is a part of the community of Trilofo.

== See also ==
- List of settlements in the Thessaloniki regional unit
