= Palataki (Thessaloniki) =

Building in Kalamaria, Greece

Coordinates: 40.5835°N 22.9364°E

Government House, Thessaloniki
- Interactive map of the Government House, Thessaloniki area

General information
- Architectural style: Neoclassical
- Location: Kalamaria (Thessaloniki), Greece
- Construction started: 1955
- Completed: 1960

Design and construction
- Architect: I. Christopoulos

The Palataki (Παλατάκι, "little palace") is the popular name for a large neoclassical mansion in the Karabournaki area of the municipality of Kalamaria. Officially it is known as the Government House (Κυβερνείο).

== History ==
The mansion was built during the 1950s as part of the post-war reconstruction of Northern Greece. The project was carried out by the Ministry of Public Works on land donated by the Ministry of National Defence. Upon completion, it was given to the Ministry for Northern Greece to serve as the official residence of the Minister.

In 1963, it was transferred to the Greek Royal Family for use as an official royal residence during visits to Macedonia. However, the Royal Family spent only one night in the palace. The family preferred instead to stay at the old Méditerranée Hotel (located directly on the city center's seafront) during their stays in the city.

In 1968, following the exile of the Royal Family to Italy due to the military junta, it was returned to the Ministry for Northern Greece. It housed various (but not all) Ministers for Northern Greece (later Ministers for Macedonia-Thrace) from 1968 until 2006. It was here that the incumbent Minister hosted the annual reception for the opening of the Thessaloniki International Fair. In 1997, as part of the events celebrating Thessaloniki as the European Capital of Culture, the mansion hosted a major exhibition of works by Caravaggio. The mansion's most notable visitor was Konstantinos Karamanlis who loyally stayed at the residence during his visits to the area while serving as Prime Minister and later President of Greece.

The last Minister to occupy the residence was Nikos Tsiartsionis who criticized the mansion as a sign of opulence which ran counter to his party's platform. In 2006, his successor, Georgios Kalantzis, closed the mansion for renovations which have yet to occur.

== Design and features ==
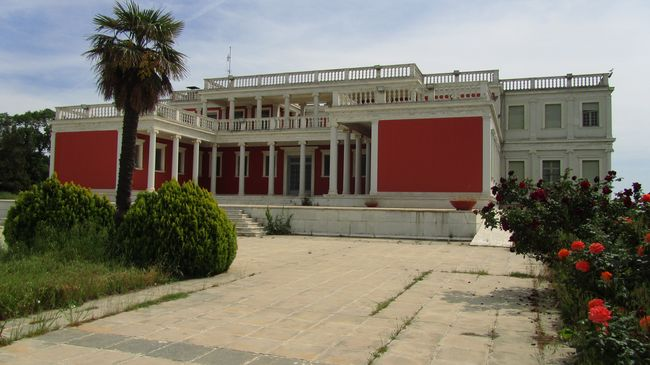
Main facade

The mansion sits on 15 acres overlooking the Thermaic Gulf about 8 km (~5 miles) south of the city center of Thessaloniki. The grounds include a main gate with guard booths, a chapel, a helipad, and access to a dock on the sea.

The front facade of the mansion is characterized by a two-level ionic colonnade and a large marble courtyard. A colonnade also runs across the rear facade of the mansion. This created ample outdoor space which facilitated the hosting of large open-air events.

The mansion itself consists of two principal floors covering 1,200 square meters (13,000 square feet). The public reception rooms are located on the ground floor; the upper floor consists of two suites and staff areas. The basement holds the kitchens, laundry, storage, and utility rooms.

== Current condition and use ==
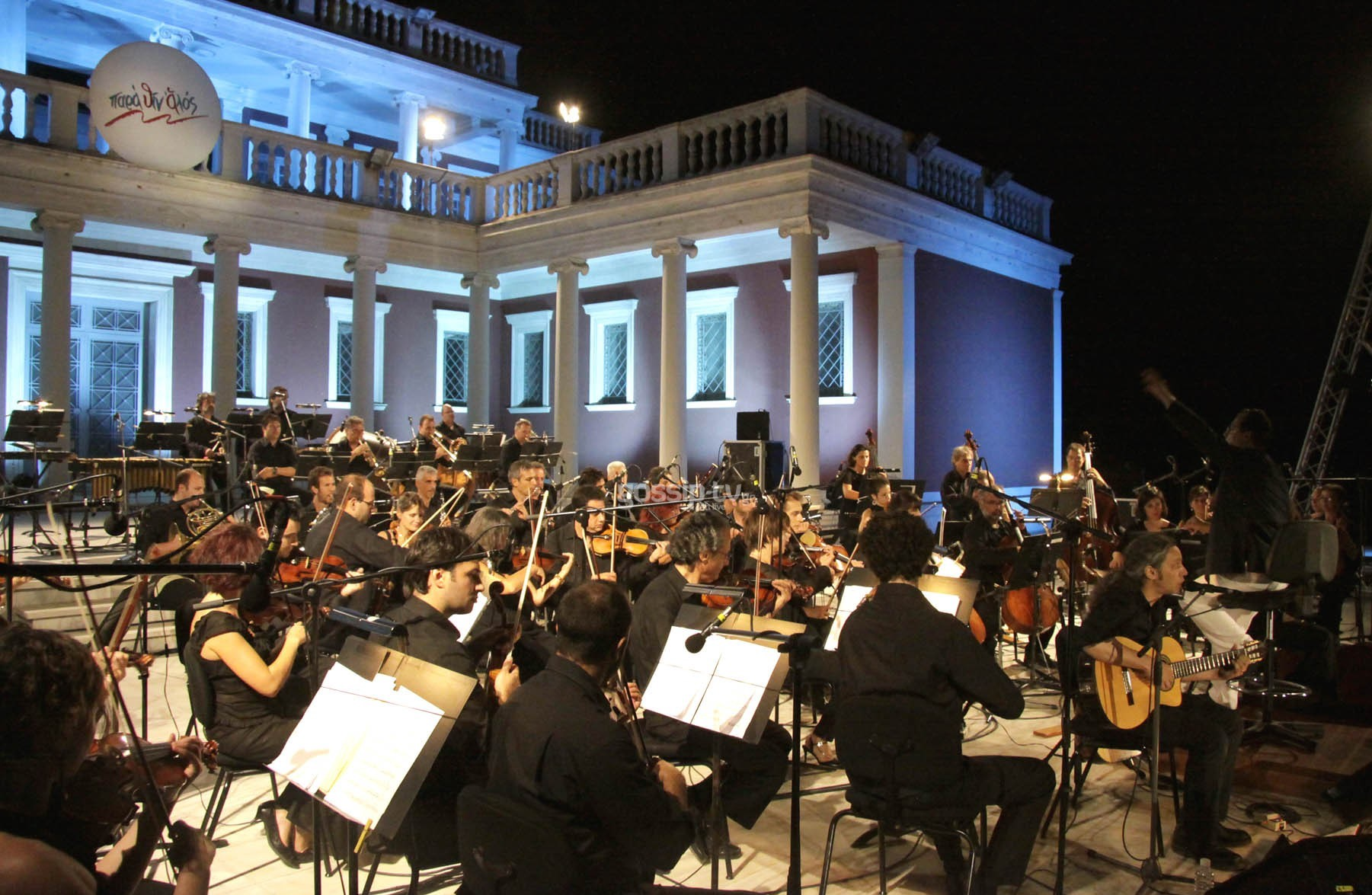
A summer concert in the courtyard (2016)

Today, the property is guarded and the grounds are maintained but the building has no specific purpose and is in need of extensive renovation. The grounds and the courtyard are used periodically for concerts, gallery exhibitions or expositions which take advantage of the building as an architectural backdrop, and its impressive seafront location. Use of the property is shared between the Ministry of Macedonia and Thrace (the legal owner) and the municipality of Kalamaria.

When the mansion was closed in 2006, the Thessaloniki Prefecture estimated that €3,800,000 was needed solely to upgrade the mansion's critical systems (electric, hydraulic, plumbing etc). Since then, due to the permeation of moisture into the mansion, most of the building's contents including all of the paintings, carpets, artwork and objects d'art have been moved to warehouses or have been loaned to museums. The basic furnishing have been wrapped in plastic and stacked in their respective rooms. No renovation/restoration work has begun.
