= 25 Martiou metro station =

Train station in Thessaloniki, Greece

25ης Μαρτίου 25 Martiou
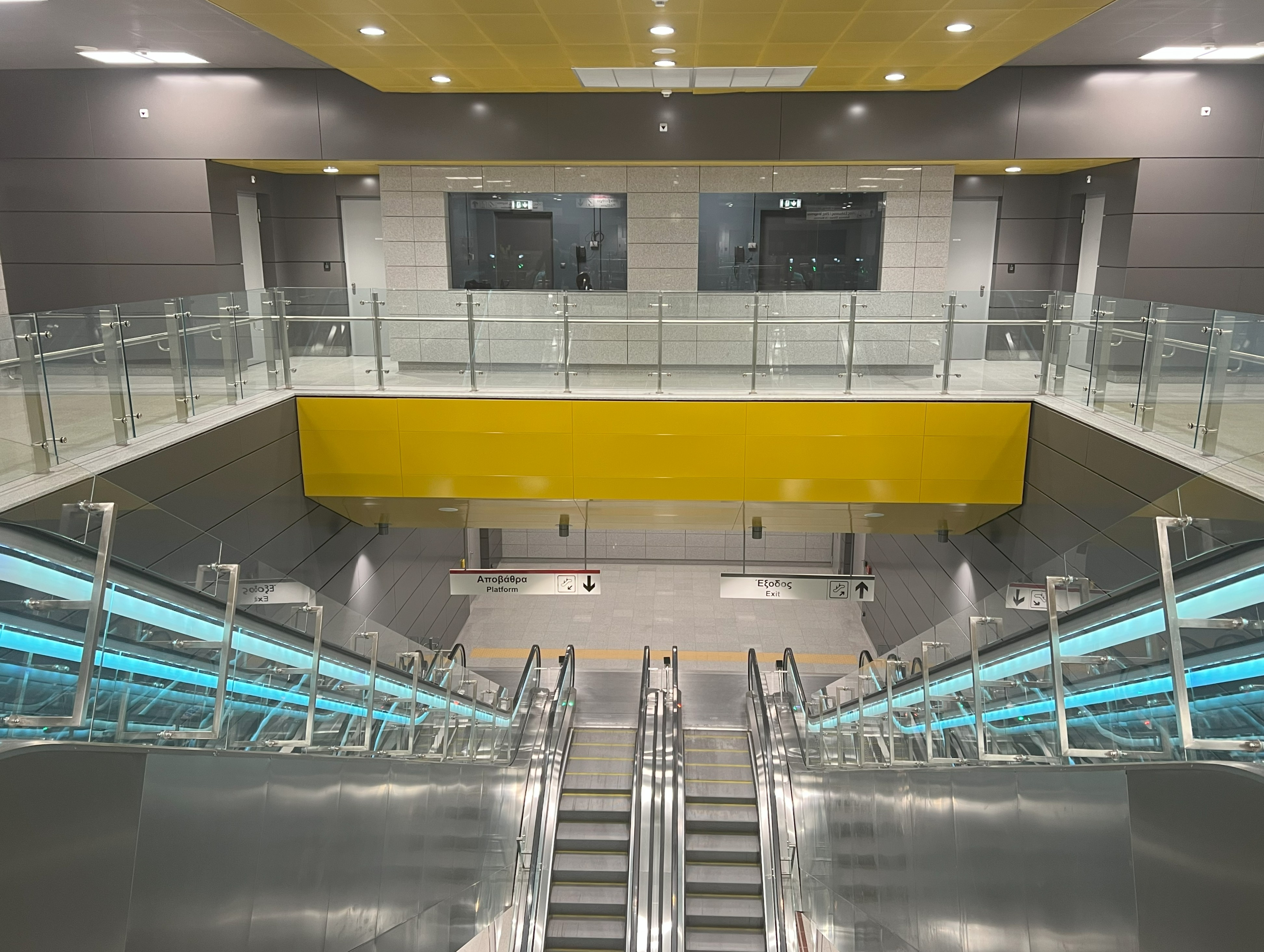

General information
- Other names: Martiou
- Location: Thessaloniki; Greece
- Coordinates: 40°36′02″N 22°57′30″E
- Owner: Elliniko Metro
- Operator: Thessaloniki Metro Automatic S.A. (THEMA)
- Transit authority: TheTA
- Line: Thessaloniki Metro Line 1 Thessaloniki Metro Line 2
- Platforms: 1 (island)
- Tracks: 2

Construction
- Structure type: Underground
- Accessible: Yes

History
- Opened: 30 November 2024

Services
| Preceding station | Thessaloniki Metro | Following station |
|---|---|---|
| Analipsi towards New Railway Station | Line 1 | Voulgari towards Nea Elvetia |
| Analipsi towards New Railway Station | Line 2 | Nomarchia towards Mikra |
Track layout
- Schematic only – not to scale.
Location

25 Martiou (Greek: 25ης Μαρτίου,, lit. '25th March') is a metro station serving Thessaloniki Metro's Line 1 and Line 2. The station takes its name from a nearby major road, which commemorates the traditional date of the start of the Greek War of Independence in 1821. It entered service in 2024.

Travelling on Line 1 or Line 2 from New Railway Station, 25 Martiou is the last station at which the two lines share tunnels. From here, Line 1 continues east towards Nea Elvetia and Line 2 south towards Mikra.

This station also appears in the 1988 Thessaloniki Metro proposal. In older iterations of the Thessaloniki Metro Lines Development Plan, the station is listed as Patrikiou, named after Minas Patrikios, a lawyer who in 1925 became the first elected Mayor of Thessaloniki. Minas Patrikios Square is located 200 metres (220 yd) south of the station. In the 1988 proposal, Patrikiou and 25 Martiou are separate stations.

== Name ==
When announcements are made in English on the onboard public address system, the station's name is given as just Martiou.

== See also ==
- List of Thessaloniki Metro stations
- Media related to 25 Martiou metro station at Wikimedia Commons
