= Henrik Nielsen =

Henrik Nielsen may refer to:

- Henrik Nielsen (gymnast) (1886–1973), Norwegian gymnast
- Henrik Nielsen (footballer born 1965), former Danish footballer
- Henrik Nielsen (footballer born 1971), retired Danish footballer
- Henrik Frystyk Nielsen (born 1969), Danish engineer and computer scientist
- Henrik Overgaard-Nielsen, Danish dentist and politician
