= Darıca =

- District and municipality
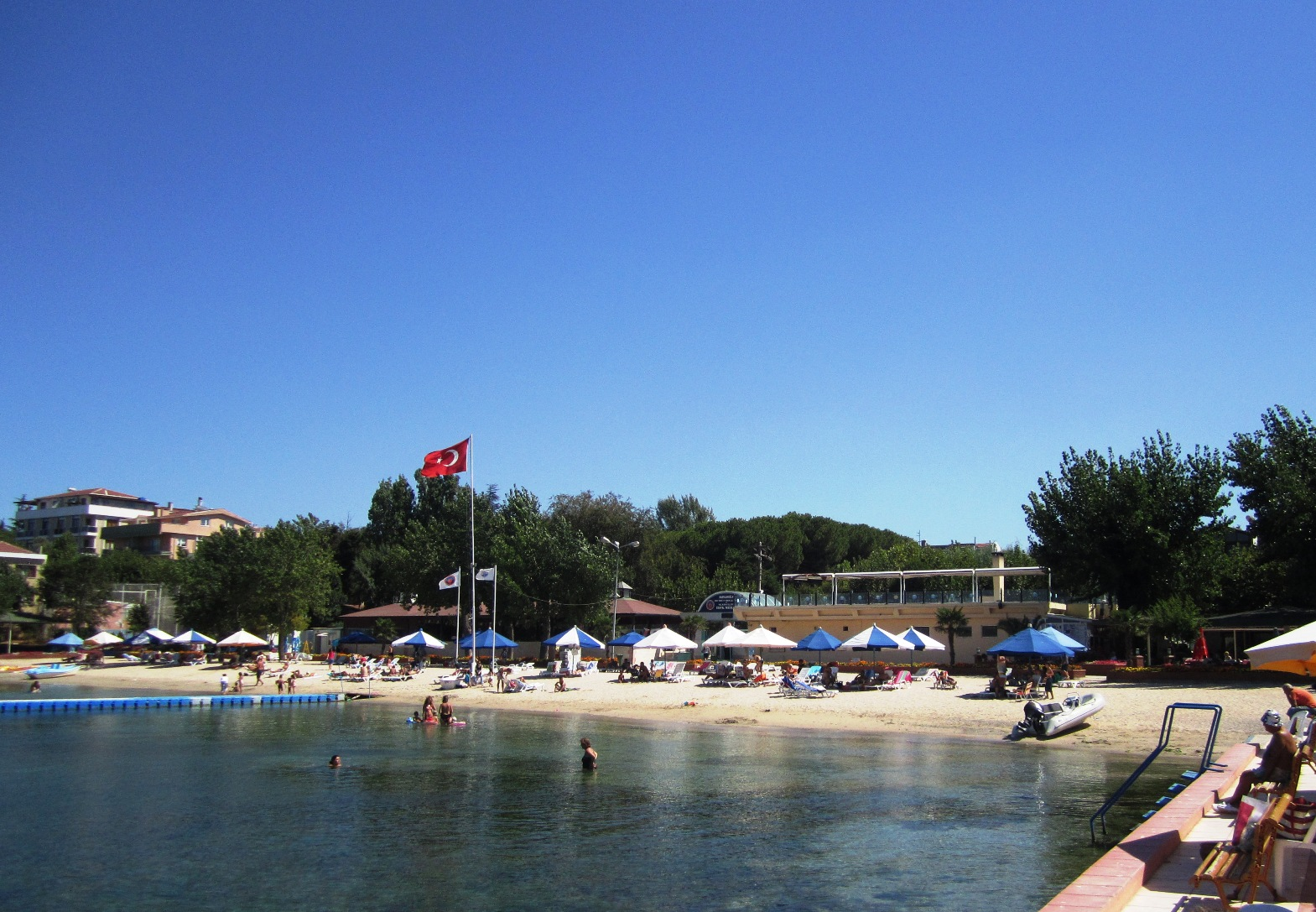
- Beach at Bayramoğlu

- Logo

- Map showing Darıca District in Kocaeli Province

- Location within Turkey Location within Marmara
- Coordinates: 40°45′35″N 29°23′08″E
- Country: Turkey
- Province: Kocaeli

Government
  - Mayor: Muzaffer Bıyık (AKP)
- Area: 23 km^{2} (8.9 sq mi)
- Population (2022): 225,602
  - Density: 9,800/km^{2} (25,000/sq mi)
- Time zone: UTC+3 (TRT)
- Postal code: 41700
- Area code: 0262
- Website: www.darica.bel.tr

Darıca (Greek: Δάριτζα, from the Byzantine τὰ Ῥίτζιον) is a municipality and district of Kocaeli Province, Turkey. The town was previously known as Aretsou (Αρετσού) by its native Greek population. Its area is 23 km^{2}, and its population is 225,602 (2022). The current mayor is Muzaffer Bıyık.

== History ==
Though Greek settlement around the Sea of Marmara dates to the first millennium BCE, the earliest reference to the Byzantine fortress of Ritzion (τὰ Ῥίτζιον) is in the works of the 12th-century historian John Kinnamos. The ruins of the fortress, which gives the town its modern name, are still located in present-day Darıca.

Prior to the expulsion of Ottoman Greeks and the population exchange between Greece and Turkey, a vast majority of the residents were ethnic Greeks who practiced Orthodox Christianity. Refugees from Aretsou/Darıca founded the Nea Aretsou neighborhood in Thessaloniki, Greece.

The Darıca district was created in 2008 from part of the district of Gebze, along with the districts Çayırova and Dilovası.

== Modern town ==
There are 14 neighborhoods in Darıca District:

- Abdi Ipekçi
- Bağlarbaşı
- Bayramoğlu
- Cami
- Emek
- Fevzi Çakmak
- Kazım Karabekir
- Nenehatun
- Osman Gazi
- Pirireis
- Sırasöğütler
- Yalı
- Yeni
- Zincirlikuyu

Darıca is located 3 km (1.8 mi) south of Gebze, 38 km (24 mi) southeast from Istanbul and sits 10 km (6.2 mi) from Sabiha Gokcen Airport, 50 km (31 mi) away from the Atatürk International Airport and 90 km (56 mi) from Istanbul Airport in Arnavutköy. Darıca is in close proximity to large-scale transit infrastructure including the D-100 highway and the Turkish State Railway station for Kocaeli.

The district contains numerous social areas and hosts a number of festivals. It is also home to the Faruk Yalçın Zoo.

In 2021, Darıca attracted controversy for naming a park after Dzhokhar Dudayev, a Chechen separatist leader who was the first president of the Chechen Republic of Ichkeria. The name was criticized by Russian-backed Chechen leader Ramzan Kadyrov and the Russian Ministry of Foreign Affairs, who called Dudayev a terrorist.
