= Apollon Kalamarias =

Greek sports club from Kalamaria, Thessaloniki

- Full name: Μορφωτικός Γυμναστικός Σύλλογος; Απόλλων Καλαμαριάς; Morfotikos Gymnastikos Syllogos; Apollon Kalamarias
- Nickname: Rossoneri
- Founded: 1926
- Colours: Red and Black
- Website: Club website

Apollon Kalamarias (Greek: Απόλλων Καλαμαριάς) is a Greek sports club from Kalamaria, a suburb of Thessaloniki. It was founded in 1926. The club is named after Apollo, the mythical Greek god. Its colors are red and black.

== History ==
When thousands of Pontic Greek refugees settled in and around Thessaloniki after the Greco-Turkish War and the ensueing population exchange, a group of them formed a musical club to continue their local traditions. The club's first emblem was the image of ancient Olympian god Apollo, Greek God of music and poetry.

Growing in popularity amongst the inhabitants of Kalamaria, the club soon expanded with a theatrical department, and later, a sports department. It was around this time the club colors were chosen: red, and black.

== Departments ==
- Apollon Kalamarias F.C., football team
- Apollon Kalamarias V.C., volleyball team
- Apollon Kalamarias B.C., basketball team
- Apollon Kalamarias women's basketball, basketball women team

== Titles ==
Apollon Kalamarias F.C.

- EPSM Championship
  - Winners (2): 1958, 1976
- Second Division
  - Winners (3): 1972–73, 1982–83, 1991–92
- Third Division
  - Winners (5): 1975-1976, 1979-1980, 2012–2013, 2016-2017, 2025-2026

Apollon Kalamarias B.C.

- Greek basketball women's Championship
  - Winner (2): 1974, 1992
- Greek basketball women's cup
  - Winner (1): 1997

Apollon Kalamarias V.C.

- Greek Volleyball League Cup
  - Runners-up (1): 2012

== Notable supporters ==
- Harry Klynn, actor, former club president
- Ioannis Sfairopoulos , basketball player and coach
- Savvas Sfairopoulos, former basketball player and coach
