= Petros Xanthopoulos =

Greek footballer

Personal information
- Date of birth: 2 September 1959 (age 67)
- Place of birth: Athens, Greece
- Height: 1.74 m (5 ft 9 in)
- Position: Defender

Senior career*
Years	Team	Apps	(Gls)
1978–1988	Olympiacos	238	(8)
1988–1990	Ethnikos Piraeus	37	(5)
1990–1991	Panionios	27	(4)
1991–1994	Proodeftiki		

International career
1984–1987	Greece	21	(0)

Managerial career
- 1999: Panargiakos
- 1999: Chalkidona
- 1999–2000: Panegialios
- 2001–2002: Fostiras
- 2002–2003: Vyzas Megara
- * Club domestic league appearances and goals

Petros Xanthopoulos (Greek: Πέτρος Ξανθόπουλος; born 2 September 1959) is a Greek retired professional footballer who played as a defender. During his club career, Xanthopoulos played for Olympiacos, Ethnikos Piraeus, Panionios and Proodeftiki. He also amassed 21 caps for the Greece national team.
