= Kalamaria metro station =

Metro station in Thessaloniki, Greece

Καλαμαριά Kalamaria

General information
- Location: Kalamaria; Thessaloniki; Greece
- Coordinates: 40°35′05″N 22°57′11″E
- Owner: Elliniko Metro
- Operator: Thessaloniki Metro Automatic S.A. (THEMA)
- Transit authority: TheTA
- Line: Thessaloniki Metro Line 2
- Platforms: 1 (island)
- Tracks: 2

Construction
- Structure type: Underground
- Accessible: Yes

History
- Opened: 27 August 2026

Services
Preceding station	Thessaloniki Metro	Following station
Nomarchia towards New Railway Station	Line 2	Aretsou towards Mikra
- Track layout
- Schematic only – not to scale.
Location

Kalamaria (Greek: Καλαμαριά,) is a metro station serving Thessaloniki Metro's Line 2. It opened on 27 August 2026.

The station is named after the area of Thessaloniki which it serves, Kalamaria, one of the densest and most populated municipalities of Greece and part of the Thessaloniki urban area.

== See also ==
- List of Thessaloniki Metro stations
