= Nea Krini metro station =

Metro station in Thessaloniki, Greece

Νέα Κρήνη Nea Krini

General information
- Location: Nea Krini; Thessaloniki; Greece
- Coordinates: 40°34′21″N 22°57′40″E
- Owner: Elliniko Metro
- Operator: Thessaloniki Metro Automatic S.A. (THEMA)
- Transit authority: TheTA
- Line: Thessaloniki Metro Line 2
- Platforms: 1 (island)
- Tracks: 2

Construction
- Structure type: Underground
- Accessible: Yes

History
- Opened: 27 August 2026

Services
Preceding station	Thessaloniki Metro	Following station
Aretsou towards New Railway Station	Line 2	Mikra Terminus
- Track layout
- Schematic only – not to scale.
Location

Nea Krini (Greek: Νέα Κρήνη,) is a metro station in the Thessaloniki neighbourhood of Nea Krini, serving Thessaloniki Metro's Line 2. It opened on 27 August 2026.

== See also ==
- List of Thessaloniki Metro stations
