= Piotr Soczyński =

Polish footballer

Personal information
- Full name: Piotr Aleksander Soczyński
- Date of birth: 18 January 1967 (age 59)
- Place of birth: Łódź, Poland
- Height: 1.83 m (6 ft 0 in)
- Position: Defender

Senior career*
Years	Team	Apps	(Gls)
1986–1989	ŁKS Łódź	87	(14)
1989–1991	Olimpia Poznań	56	(6)
1991–1992	Fenerbahçe	27	(0)
1992–1994	Olimpia Poznań	17+	(0+)
1994–1995	Vanspor	37	(2)
1995	Intrat Wałcz		
1996–1998	Dyskobolia Grodzisk Wielkopolski	29+	(1+)
1999	Pogoń Świebodzin		
2000	Olimpia Poznań		
2008	Sokół Aleksandrów Łódzki II		

International career
1989-1992	Poland	30	(1)
- * Club domestic league appearances and goals

Piotr Aleksander Soczyński (born 18 January 1967) is a Polish former professional footballer who played as a defender.

== Career ==
In 1991, Soczyński signed for Turkish side Fenerbahçe, where he made 27 league appearances and scored no goals and said, "in Istanbul, thirty thousand fans could attend training sessions". On 1 September 1991, he debuted for Fenerbahçe during a 1–2 loss to Aydınspor. In 1992, Soczyński signed for Olimpia Poznań in Poland, where he suffered relegation to the Polish second division.

In 1994, Soczyński signed for Turkish top flight club Vanspor. where he said, "there were many terrorists in Van, and the rulers wanted a substitute for normalcy. There are only mountains around. I lived in the barracks for three months, many of my friends were soldiers. We trained on a pitch full of holes, 40 meters by 20. Orlik is at the same time the pinnacle of luxury. I did not believe that a league team can practice in such conditions. They treated me exceptionally, because former Fenerbahce players didn't seem to be in that direction. The idyll ended with the arrival of the coach from Romania. He was looking for a place for his compatriots and had to get rid of the remaining foreigners from the team. They started insisting that I give up my money. During the conversations, they put the guns on the table. But I wasn't cracking. We reported to the Polish embassy, it helped. I did not let them go and it ended well".

After that, he signed for Intrat Wałcz in the Polish third division. Before the second half of the 1999–2000 season, Soczyński returned to Polish fourth division team Olimpia Poznań. In early 2008, he signed for Sokół II Aleksandrów Łódzki in the Polish sixth division.
