= Aretsou metro station =

Metro station in Thessaloniki, Greece

Αρετσού Aretsou
- L2 Thessaloniki Metro Aretsou Station

General information
- Location: Nea Aretsou; Thessaloniki; Greece
- Coordinates: 40°34′43″N 22°57′16″E
- Owner: Elliniko Metro
- Operator: Thessaloniki Metro Automatic S.A. (THEMA)
- Transit authority: TheTA
- Line: Thessaloniki Metro Line 2
- Platforms: 1 (island)
- Tracks: 2

Construction
- Structure type: Underground
- Accessible: Yes

History
- Opened: 27 August 2026

Services
Preceding station	Thessaloniki Metro	Following station
Kalamaria towards New Railway Station	Line 2	Nea Krini towards Mikra
- Track layout
- Schematic only – not to scale.
Location

Aretsou (Greek: Αρετσού,) is a metro station serving Thessaloniki Metro's Line 2. The station is named after the district of Nea Aretsou, in which it is located. It opened on 27 August 2026.

== See also ==
- List of Thessaloniki Metro stations
