= Nea Krini =

Neighborhood of Kalamaria, Thessaloniki, Greece

Coordinates: 40°34′N 22°58′E

Nea Krini (Greek: Νέα Κρήνη) is a district of the municipality of Kalamaria, Thessaloniki regional unit, Greece. It was originally founded by Greek refugees from the city of Krini (modern day Çeşme) in Asia Minor, who named the neighbourhood after it. Historically, most of its residents practiced commercial fishing, although the importance of fishing in the area has diminished. In 2022, a monument to the refugees was inaugurated in the area.

The district will be served by the Thessaloniki Metro through Nea Krini metro station from July 2026.

== Sport Clubs ==
In Nea Krini there are two major neighbouring football clubs, AE Nea Krini (Greek: Αθλητική Ένωση Νέας Κρήνης, English: Athletic Union of Nea Krini) and Agios Georgios (Greek: Αθλητική Ένωση Αγίου Γεωργίου Κρήνης, English: Saint George Athletic Union).
