= Nea Aretsou =

District of Kalamaria, Thessaloniki, Greece

Coordinates: 40.575°N 22.950°E

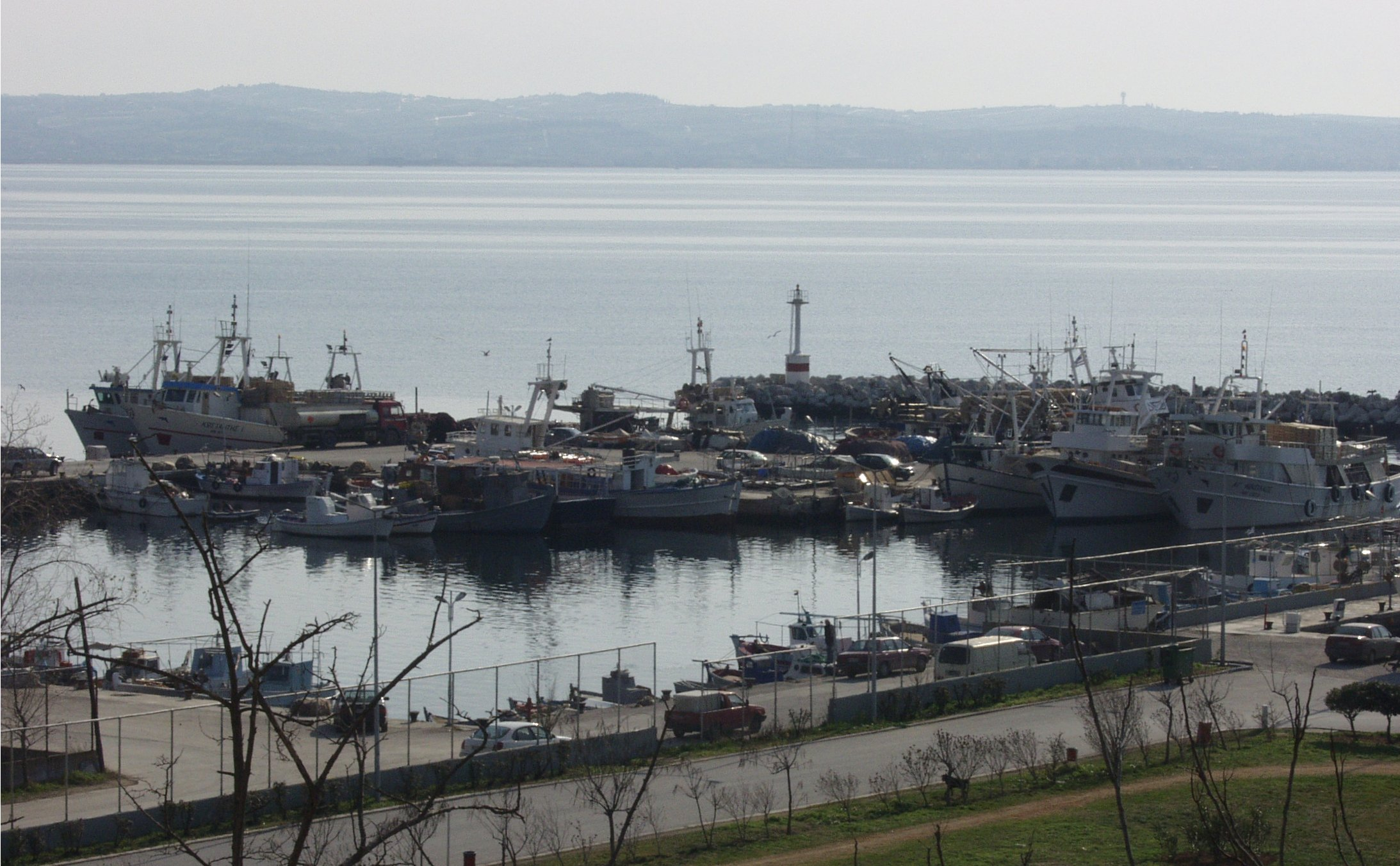
Marina of Aretsou

Nea Aretsou (Greek: Νέα Αρετσού) is a district of Kalamaria, Thessaloniki, Greece. It was founded in the 1920s and populated by Greek refugees from the town of Aretsou (modern day Darıca) in Asia Minor, from which it gets its name. The name "Aretsou" is a degeneration of the original name of the ancient Greek colony of Arethousa.

The district will be served by the Thessaloniki Metro through Aretsou metro station from July 2026.
