= Nomarchia metro station =

Metro station in Thessaloniki, Greece

Νομαρχία Nomarchia

General information
- Location: Villa Allatini; Thessaloniki; Greece
- Coordinates: 40°35′29″N 22°57′25″E
- Owner: Elliniko Metro
- Operator: Thessaloniki Metro Automatic S.A. (THEMA)
- Transit authority: TheTA
- Line: Thessaloniki Metro Line 2
- Platforms: 1 (island)
- Tracks: 2

Construction
- Structure type: Underground
- Accessible: Yes

History
- Opened: 27 August 2026

Services
Preceding station	Thessaloniki Metro	Following station
25 Martiou towards New Railway Station	Line 2	Kalamaria towards Mikra
Track layout
- Schematic only – not to scale.
Location

Nomarchia (Greek: Νομαρχία,, lit. 'Prefectural Administration') is a metro station serving Thessaloniki Metro's Line 2. The station is named after the nearby Villa Allatini, which housed the administrative headquarters of the Prefecture of Thessaloniki (Greek: Νομαρχία Θεσσαλονίκης, Nomarchia Thessalonikis). Prefectures were abolished in 2010, and the Villa now hosts some offices of the Central Macedonia regional administration, but the station name remains unaffected. It opened on 27 August 2026.

== See also ==
- List of Thessaloniki Metro stations
