= Andreas Zafiropoulos =

Greek businessman (1933–2025)

- Ανδρέας Ζαφειρόπουλος

23rd President of AEK Athens
- In office 9 June 1981 – 14 June 1982
- Preceded by: Loukas Barlos
- Succeeded by: Michalis Arkadis

26th President of AEK Athens
- In office 10 January 1984 – 12 June 1988
- Preceded by: Lefteris Panagidis
- Succeeded by: Kostas Generakis

Personal details
- Born: 20 September 1933 Kiato, Greece
- Died: 23 July 2025 (aged 91) Athens, Greece
- Occupation: Entrepreneur
- Known for: Owner of AEK Athens F.C.

Andreas Zafiropoulos (Greek: Ανδρέας Ζαφειρόπουλος; 20 September 1933 – 23 July 2025) was a Greek businessman who was the major shareholder of AEK Athens F.C., from 1981 to 1992. During this time, he sometimes gave up the presidency and therefore management of the club, but always kept its shares. During his ownership, AEK won two Championships, one Cup, a Super Cup and a League Cup. In the summer 1992 he sold his shares of the club to the duo of Dimitris Melissanidis and Giannis Karras. From then on he was not actively involved with AEK, but from time to time he used to participate in various events and actions of the team.

== Early life ==
Zafiropoulos, originally from Kiato of Corinthia, studied economics at the Athens University of Economics and Business. In 1963 he, alongside his brother, Panagiotis, took over from their father, Ioannis, the ownership of his sporting goods company "Zita Hellas", which during its heyday was the largest of this sector in Greece. Zafiropoulos was also referred to by the media as "Mr. Zita" or simply "Zita", due to the name of his company.

== AEK Athens ==
Since the 1970s Zafiropoulos was involved with the management of AEK Athens. After the resignation of Loukas Barlos from the ownership of the club in June 1981, he stepped in and became its new owner. His ownership was marked by administrative changes and successive changes of managers on their bench. Despite his wealth, he could not compete financially with either the Vardinogiannis family that owned Panathinaikos, or the group of shipowners that owned Olympiacos led by Stavros Daifas. Nevertheless, he signed players such as Hristo Bonev, Håkan Sandberg and Márton Esterházy. In the summer of 1982, he stepped out of the presidency of AEK Athens due to "displeasure" by the supporters to his face. He retained the club's shares, but handed over the management to the shipowner and a long associate of Loukas Barlos, Michalis Arkadis. At the end of the season AEK won the Greek Cup, with Arkadis taking most of the credit. With Arkadis not being able to bear the financial obligations of the club, he stepped out of its presidency and Zafiropoulos anointed the Cypriot businessman, Lefteris Panagidis as his successor. However, in January 1984, he returned to the administrative activities of the club, assuming its presidency. With the overwhelming majority of the supporters against, he handed over the management of club to the nightclub owner, Stratos Gidopoulos in June 1988. The latter made one of the most important moves in the history of the club and appointed the former player, Dušan Bajević in the position of the manager. That marked the beginning of a new era in the club, since Bajević eventually became AEK Athens' most successful manager. In his first season at the club AEK also won the championship, sealing the title in the penultimate matchday with the famous 1–0 away victory over Olympiacos, with a goal by Takis Karagiozopoulos. This was the first league title of his ownership and the first of the club after 10 years. Yet again, Zafiropoulos was overshadowed by Gidopoulos. With Bajević on the bench AEK won the Greek Super Cup in 1989 the Greek League Cup in 1990 and another championship in 1992. With Zafiropoulos not being able to bear the financial weight of the club since the previous seasons, the duo Melissanidis-Karras expressed interest in the purchase of his shares and on 17 June 1992 they officially became the new owners of the club.

=== Conflicts ===
In 1987, Zafiropoulos and the manager of AEK, Nikos Alefantos, were accused by a section of the supporters, of having organized and methodized, with disparaging statements and publications, the expulsion of Thomas Mavros from the club. The press of the time wrote a lot about Zafiropoulos and Alefantos' conflicts with Mavros, and in fact some newspapers claimed that there were even political reasons for the conflict. On 15 May 1988, during the last match of the season at Nea Filadelfeia against Iraklis, the ultras had enough with Zafiropoulos, who considered him unable to lift the "weight" of handling the club. As a result riot police, in an incomprehensible decision, entered the ultras stand and beat whoever stood in front of them which resulted in very heated encounters with the ultras. There were many who believe that Zafiropoulos influenced the police officers to act in this way.

== Political affiliations ==
Zafiropoulos was also politically active as a PASOK official, and believed he could use his government connections to help AEK. Indeed, his relationship with leading government and party officials helped the group, mainly in financial facilities and loans, but in general at that time the factor with the best relations with the government (and personally with Andreas Papandreou) was Yiorgos Vardinogiannis of Panathinaikos.

== Death ==
Zafiropoulos died on 23 July 2025, at the age of 91.
