= Trilofo, Thessaloniki =

Trilofo Τρίλοφο
- Community
- Location within Greece
- Coordinates: 40°28′N 22°58.3′E
- Country: Greece
- Administrative region: Central Macedonia
- Regional unit: Thessaloniki
- Municipality: Thermi
- Municipal unit: Mikra

Area
  - Community: 34.875 km^{2} (13.465 sq mi)
- Elevation: 141 m (463 ft)

Population (2021)
  - Community: 6,727
  - Density: 192.9/km^{2} (499.6/sq mi)
- Time zone: UTC+2 (EET)
  - Summer (DST): UTC+3 (EEST)
- Postal code: 575 00
- Area code: +30-2392
- Vehicle registration: NA to NX

Trilofo (Greek: Τρίλοφο) is a village and a community of the Thermi municipality. Before the 2011 local government reform it was part of the municipality of Mikra, of which it was a municipal district. The 2021 census recorded 6,727 inhabitants in the community of Trilofo. The community of Trilofo covers an area of 34.875 km^{2}.

== Administrative division ==
The community of Trilofo consists of two separate settlements (2021 populations):

- Ano Scholari (population 170)
- Trilofo (population 6,557)

== See also ==
- List of settlements in the Thessaloniki regional unit
