= Stratos Gidopoulos =

Greek footballer and businessman (born 1941)

28th president of AEK Athens
- In office 13 June 1988 – 12 May 1991
- Preceded by: Kostas Generakis
- Succeeded by: Kostas Angelopoulos

Personal details
- Born: 1941 (age 84–85) Athens, Greece
- Occupation: Entrepreneur
- Known for: President of AEK Athens F.C.
Association football career
- Full name: Efstratios Gidopoulos
- Position: Goalkeeper
Senior career*
| Years | Team | Apps | (Gls) |
| 1959–1960 | Apollon Athens | 4 | (0) |
| 1960– | OFI | | |
| –1970 | Olympiacos Volos | | |
- Asteras Exarchion
- * Club domestic league appearances and goals

Stratos Gidopoulos (Greek: Στράτος Γιδόπουλος; born in 1941) is a Greek former footballer, sports agent and nightclub entrepreneur. Gidopoulos is mainly known for his tenure as president of AEK Athens F.C..

== Football career ==
As a footballer, Gidopoulos played as a goalkeeper. One of the highlights of his career was his participation in the senior team of Apollon Athens, which played in the first championship of Alpha Ethniki and finished in 4th place behind the champion Panathinaikos, AEK Athens and Olympiacos. He also played for OFI and Olympiacos Volos, while towards the end of his football career he played for Asteras Exarchion in the Athenian championships.

== Nightclub ownership ==
He rose to prominence in the 1980s as the owner of large beach nightclubs in the southern suburbs of Athens (the newspapers called him "Lord of the Night"), the most famous of which was "Archipelagos", where many government officials also frequented.

== Sport's official ==
=== President of AEK Athens ===
In 1988, the owner of AEK Athens F.C., Andreas Zafiropoulos stepped down of the presidency from the club, with the majority of the supporters turned against him. On 11 June he eventually handed the club's presidency to Gidopoulos. He was the one who brought Dušan Bajević as manager, and essentially began a golden era of the yellow-blacks. With Gidopoulos at the wheel, AEK returned to the titles, winning the 1989 championship, while he was beloved to the supporters and was seriously considered by the opponents as a club's official, since he played a catalytic role in changing the climate in the administrative sector. The following season under his presidency the club won the 1989 Greek Super Cup and the Greek League Cup. He was responsible for major signings such as Mirosław Okoński, Antonis Minou, Toni Savevski and Daniel Batista. In the summer of 1991 as Zafiropoulos was not able to bare the financial weight of the club and since he didn't have any shares and at the request of the organized fans, he departed from the management of AEK. As a result, the Court of First Instance chose a temporary administration led by Kostas Generakis.

=== Involvement in other clubs ===
His involvement with the administration of AEK, did not prevent him from enacting with other clubs as well, later on. He became the president of Panionios for a short period in 1996 and in July 1999 he took over as the captain of the football department at PAOK. In 2008 he took the wheel as the president of third-tier club, Niki Volos for 3 years and in 2014 he was appointed as the executive director at Apollon Smyrnis.

== Political affiliations ==
Gidopoulos was also known for his political activity as a PASOK executive, as he was a close friend of the MP and minister Evangelos Yannopoulos, who also frequented his nightclubs. Giannopoulos had promised him that he would put him on the PASOK ballot in the Athens B for the elections of November 1989, but he met with strong resistance from members of the PASOK Executive Bureau, and Gidopoulos was eventually "cut" from the lists of parliamentary candidates. Gidopoulos himself stated on the issue on November 6, immediately after the elections: "I told them in the Executive Office: put me on the ballot to bring two more seats to Andreas, and I'll sign a paper saying that the next day I'm resigning! I don't want to be an MP, I'm happy being president of AEK. They didn't want to. What should we do, it doesn't matter, as long as we did well. AEK is doing well, PASOK is the same."
