= Tsimiski Street =

Major commercial street in Thessaloniki, Greece

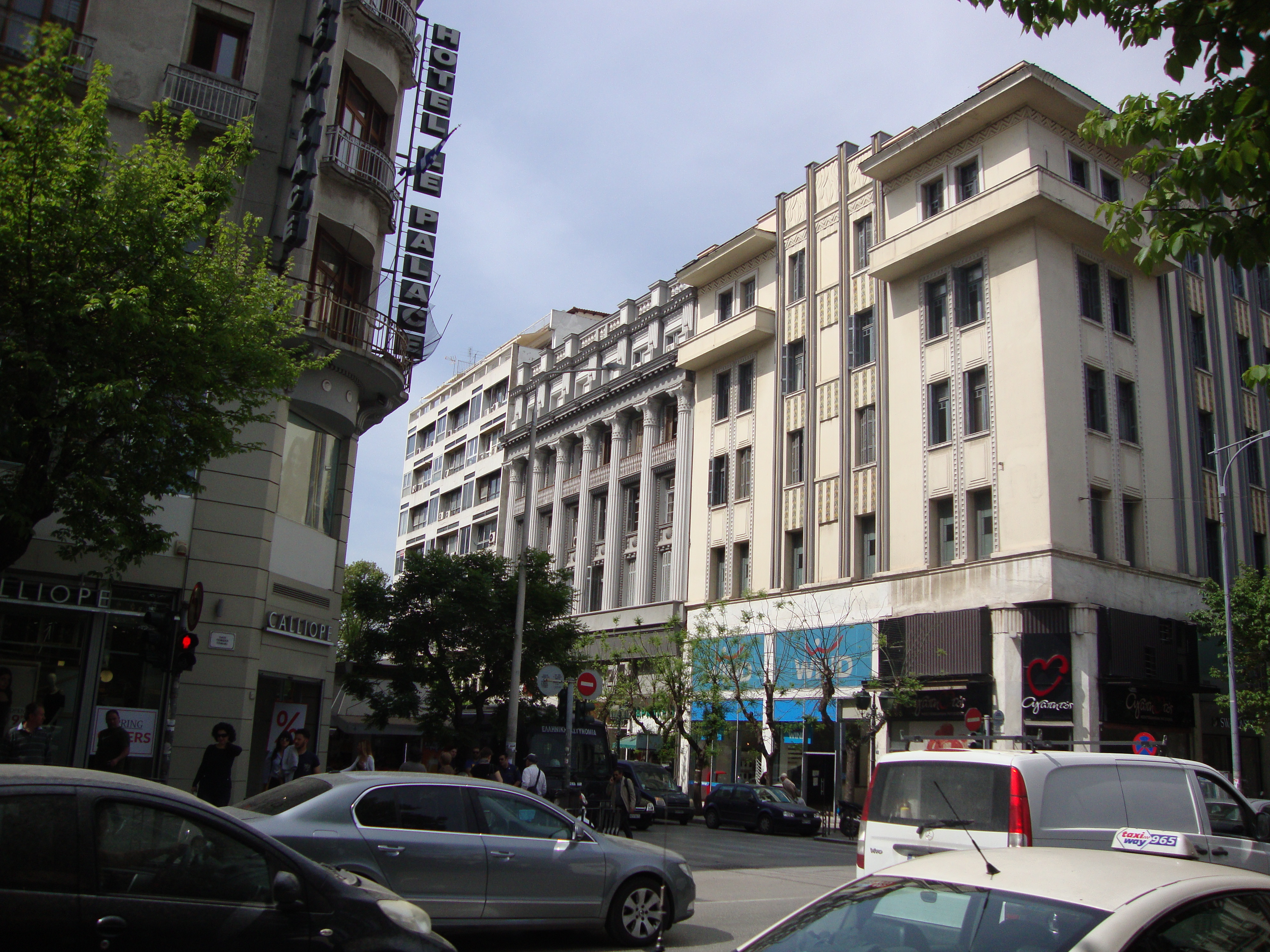
- Street view
- Interactive map of Tsimiski Street
- Native name: Οδός Τσιμισκή (Greek)
- Namesake: John I Tzimiskes
- Length: 1.6 km (0.99 mi)
- Location: Thessaloniki, Macedonia, Greece
- Coordinates: 40°37′49″N 22°56′48″E
- From: YMCA Square
- To: Katouni Street

Tsimiski Street (Greek: Οδός Τσιμισκή, Odós Tsimiskí) is a major avenue in Thessaloniki, the second-largest city in Greece. It starts from the area of the Thessaloniki International Fair grounds, between Aggelaki Street and Nikolaou Germanou Street and ends in the crossroad with Ionos Dragoumi Street, on the western side of the city centre. Tsimiski Street was named after the Byzantine Emperor, Ioannis Tzimiskis and is nowadays one of the busiest streets in Thessaloniki's city center and the country. The busiest point of Tsimiski Street is its crossroad with Aristotelous Square which is a major meeting-point for Thessalonians, also forming a cultural axis with Aristotelous Square.

== History ==
Prior to the Balkan Wars and the acquisition of Thessaloniki by Greece, the road that eventually became Tsimiski Street was called "the second parallel", a reference to its location being the second street to be built parallel to the city's waterfront, the other being Proxenou Koromila Street. Before 1890, the street connected the two sides of Thessaloniki, from the eastern city walls to the west. In 1913, when the city was in Greek hands, the street was then renamed after Ioannis Tsimiskis, a Byzantine Emperor notable for his struggles against Bulgarians. The choice of name was the result of Greek-Bulgarian tensions at the time in regards to who would eventually win the city of Thessaloniki after the Balkan Wars.

The street took its current form after the Great Thessaloniki Fire of 1917, which levelled much of downtown Thessaloniki. French architect Ernest Hebrard who designed the new master plan for Thessaloniki was also the one that included the current design for Tsimiski Street. The street in its current form was built in 1921.

== Use ==
=== Shops ===
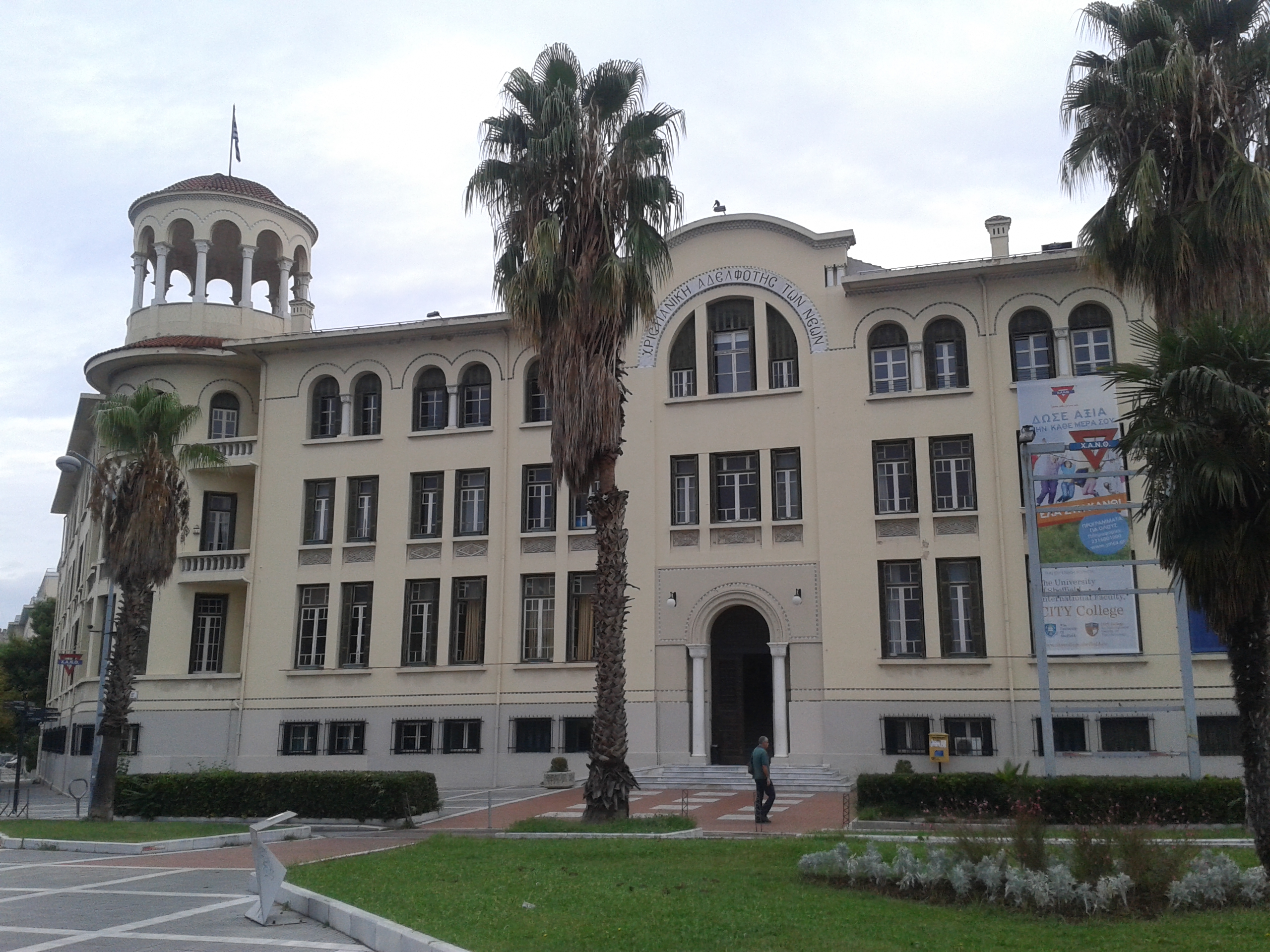
The building of YMCA (Chanth) on Chanth Square, from where Tsimiski starts

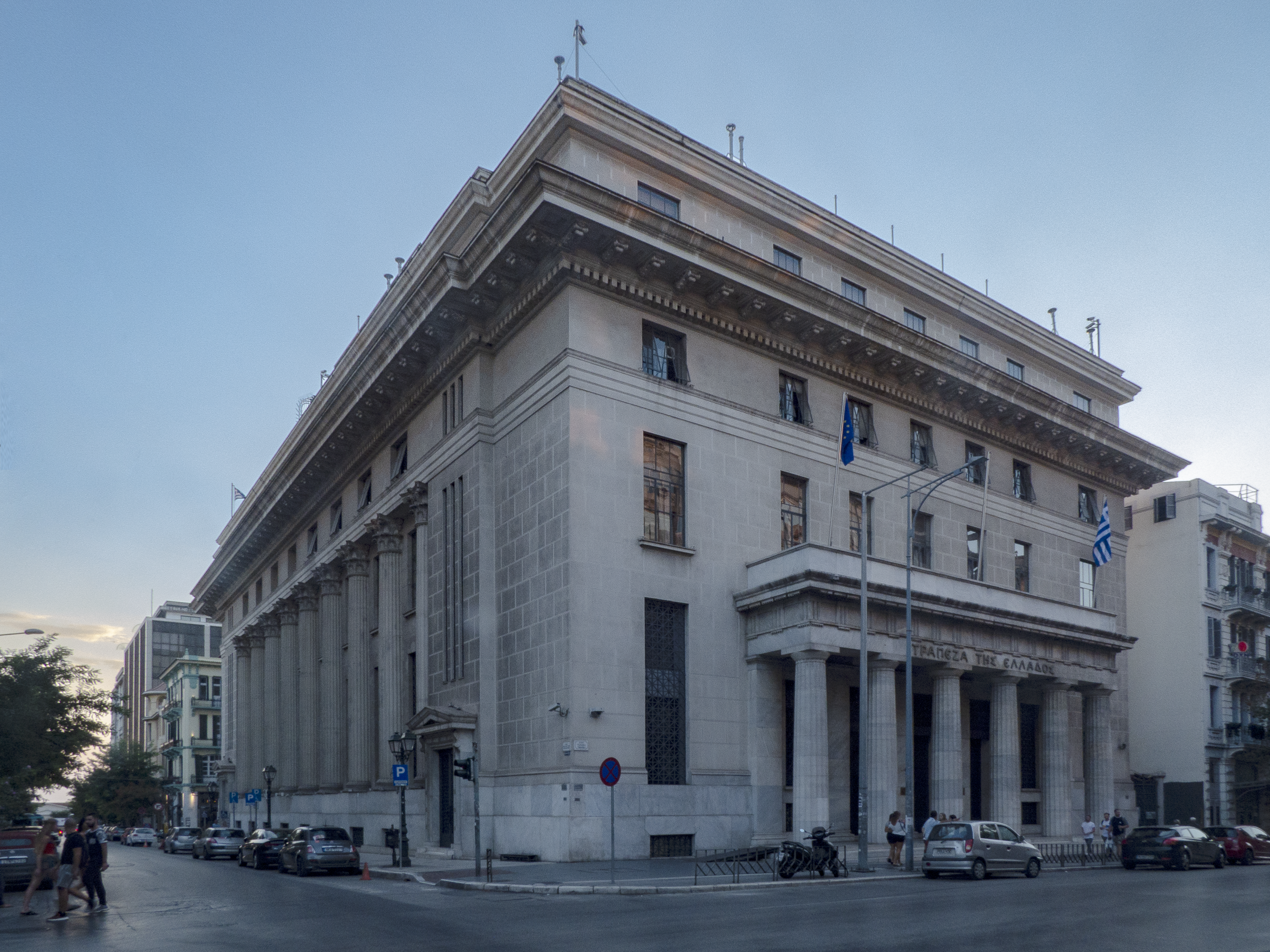
The building of the Bank of Greece

The most prominent features of Tsimiski street are the hundreds of various fashion shops, boutiques, high end international department stores and Fokas, the biggest Greek department store in the city centre. Tsimiski Street is also home to the Plateia Center Mall, the largest shopping mall in the city centre of Thessaloniki, which contains the Plateia Assos Odeon multiplex and has facilities from bars, restaurants, a virgin music megastore to fitness centers. The mall also houses the United States Consulate in Thessaloniki, as well as the liaison office of the Republic of North Macedonia.

=== Offices ===
The buildings along Tsimiski street house many of the city's major offices, ranging from financing, advertising, law and engineering firms. The western end of the street is also home to the city's financial district, with the building of the central offices of the Bank of Greece located there and regarded as one of the most imposing buildings in the city. Other banks that have their central offices for Thessaloniki and northern Greece on Tsimiski Street, include Piraeus Bank, and previously the Bank of Macedonia and Thrace. The Thessaloniki YMCA is located at the start of Tsimiski Street, on the intersection with Nikolaou Germanou Street.

=== Traffic ===
Tsimiski street was designed as a four-lane one-way avenue that crossed the entire length of the city center of Thessaloniki. The design proved effective, but with the rise in the number of cars in Thessaloniki in recent years, it has become congested. A bus lane has also been added recently to facilitate faster bus transport by the Thessaloniki Urban Transport Organization, which has made matters worse in terms of traffic. The Thessaloniki Metro opened to the public on 30 November 2024. Its main line is 9/6 km long with 13 stations. Construction uncovered about 300,000 artifacts from the ancient, medieval and Ottoman periods.

== Gallery ==
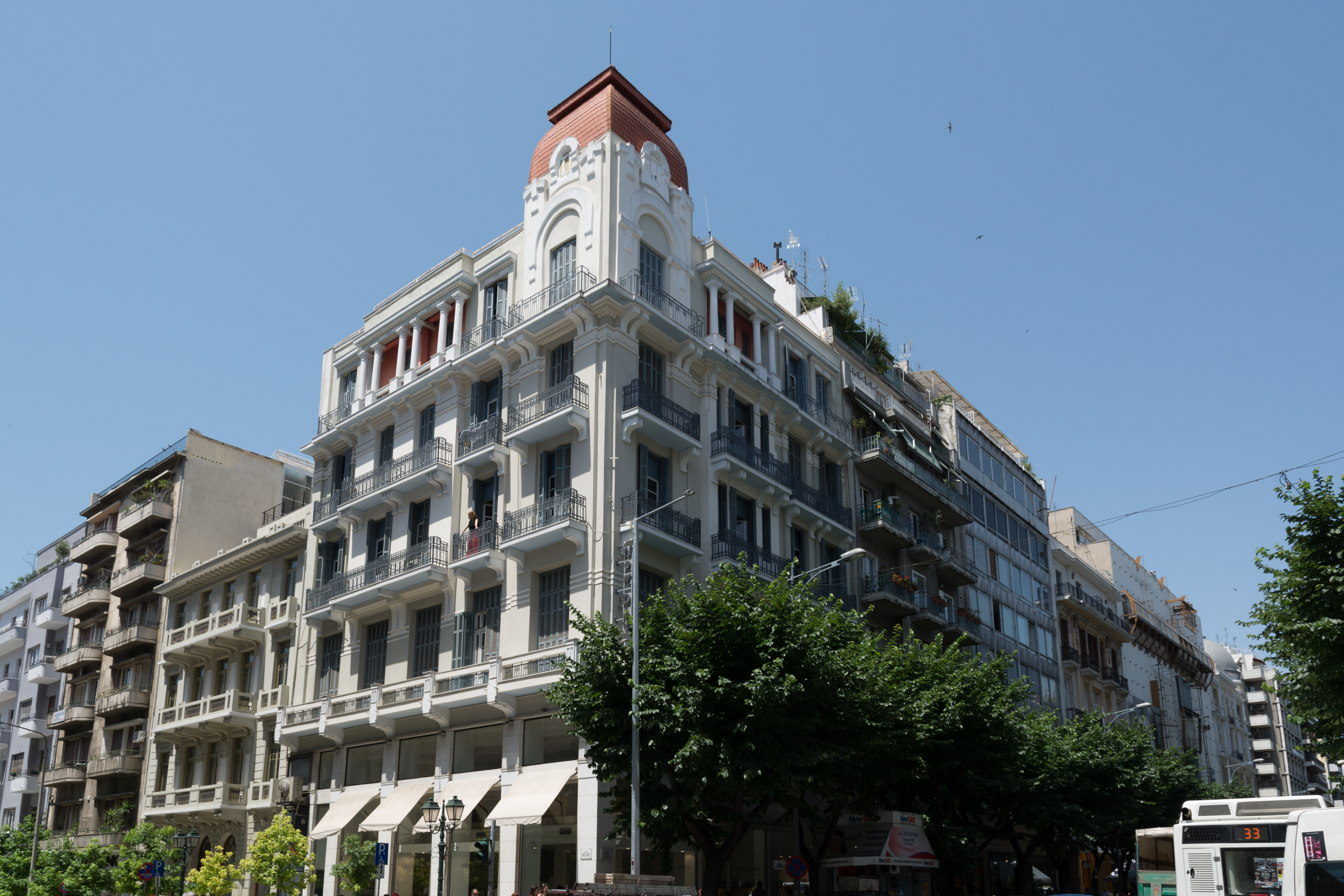
Former Hotel Astoria

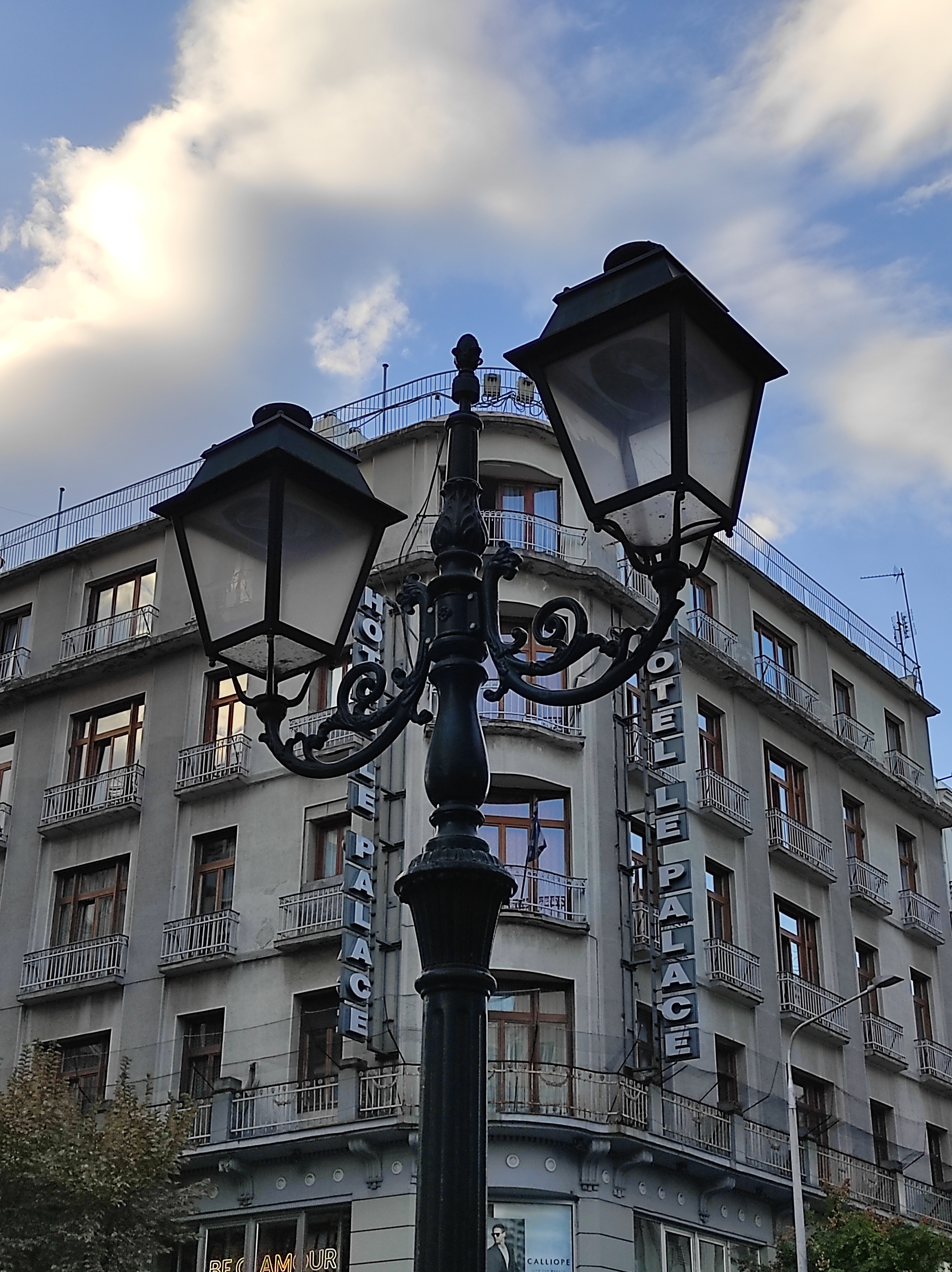
Hotel Le Palace

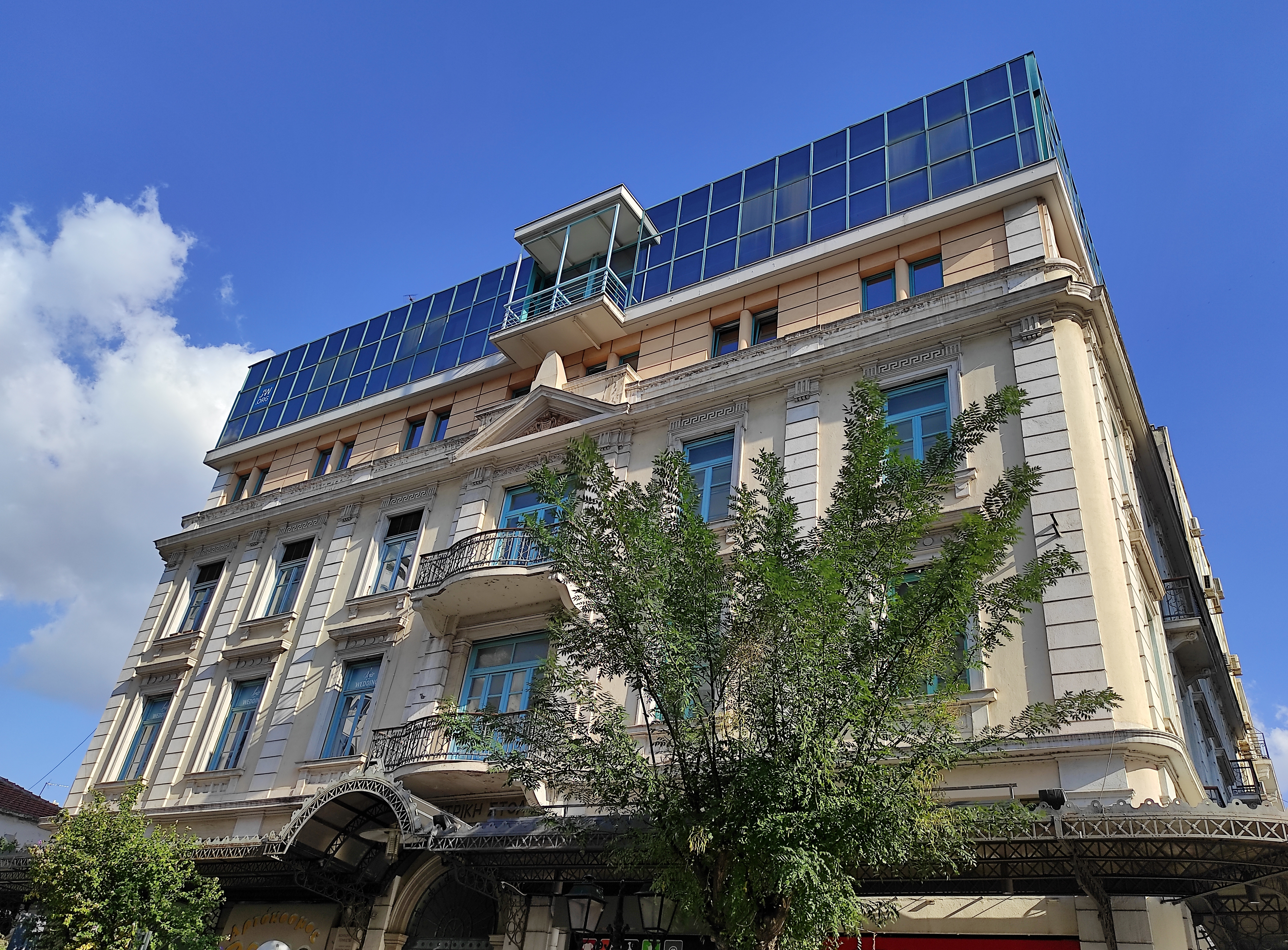
Kazes mansion

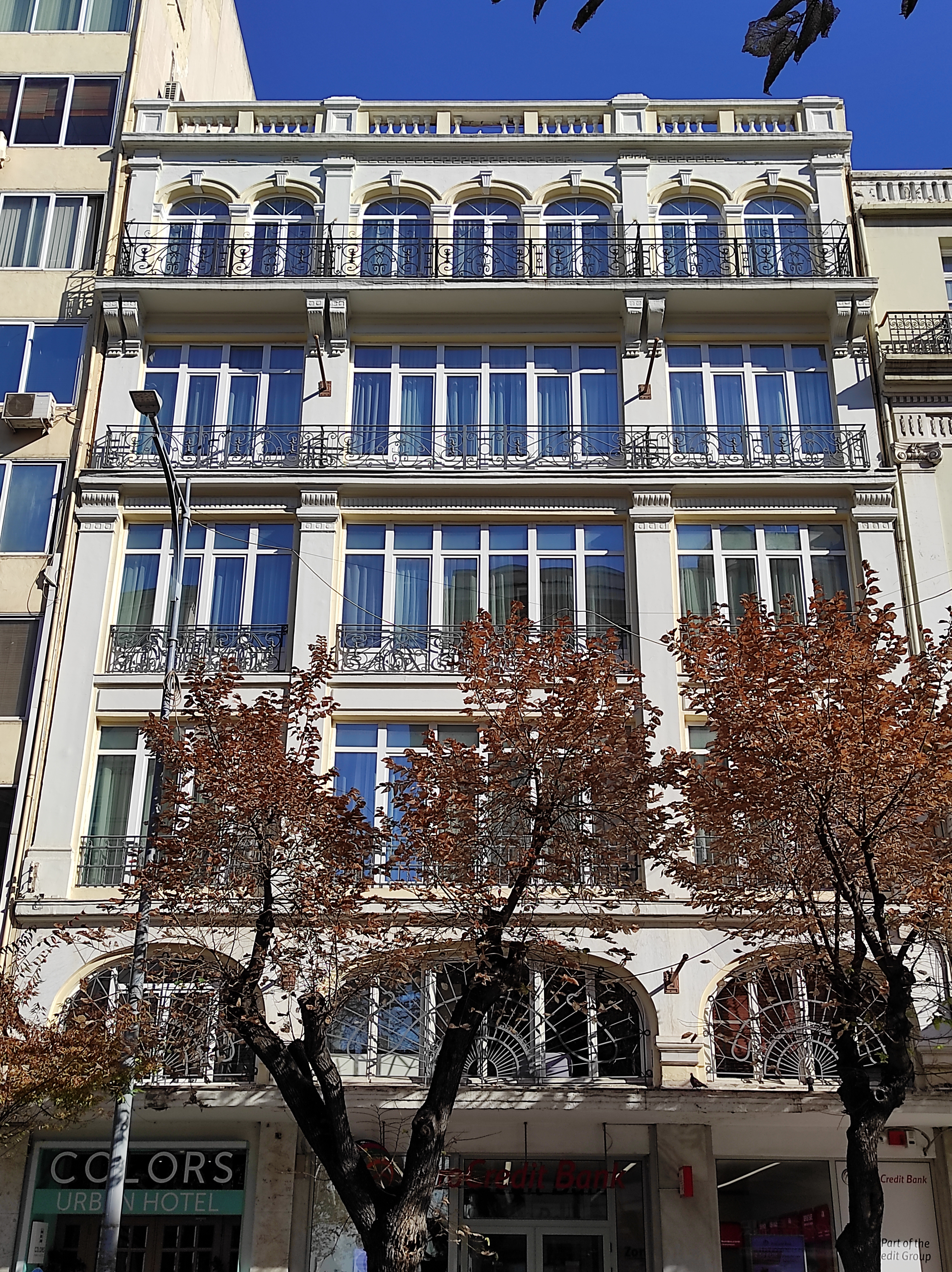
Nahmias mansion

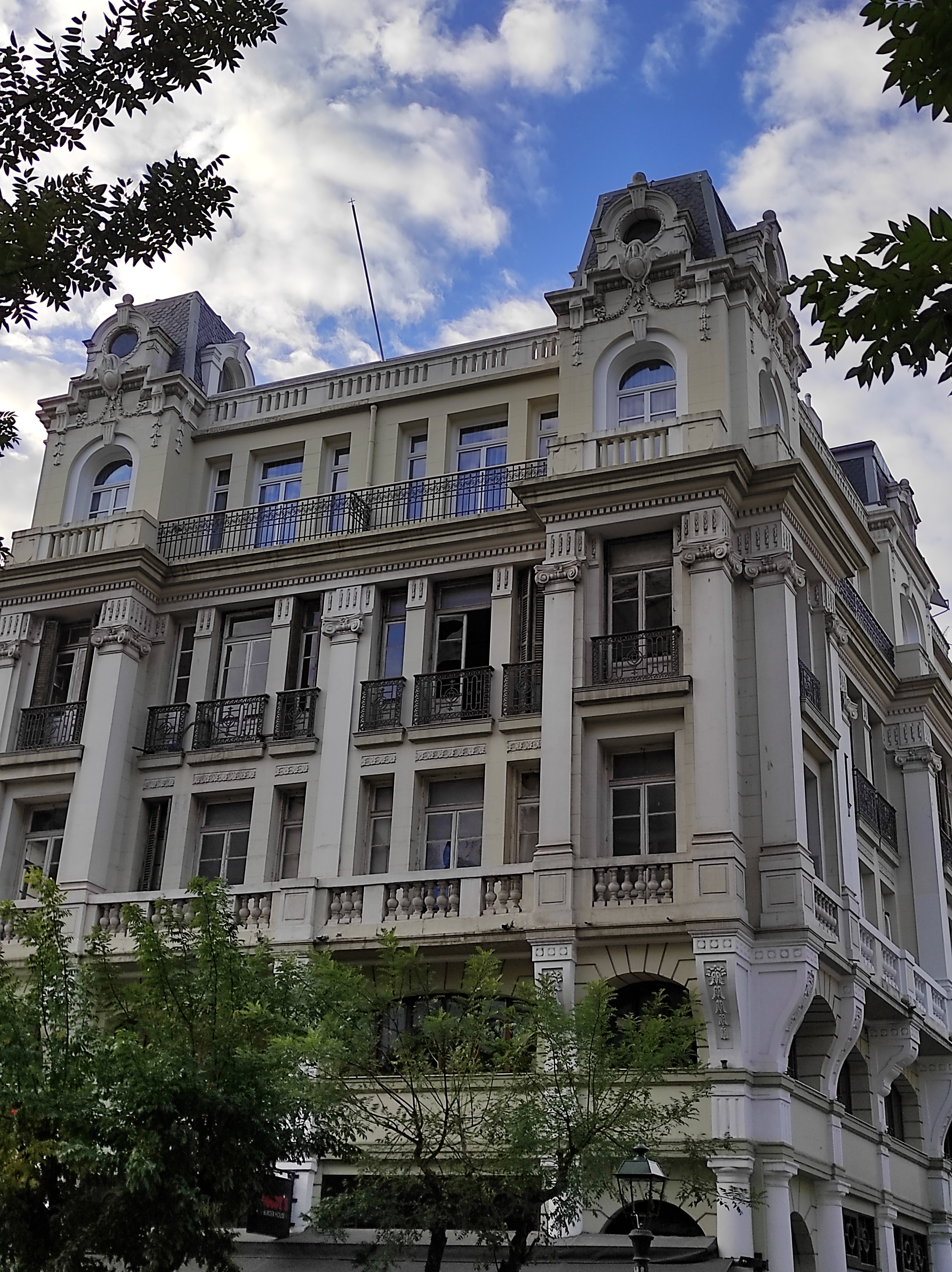
Gategno-Florentin mansion (arch.Joseph Pleyber)

== See also ==
- Aristotelous Square
