= Kalai (surname) =

Kalai (Hebrew: קלעי) is a surname and a given name of multiple origins.

It may be a surname of Sephardic Jewish origins. As such, it is derived from Arabic Qal'a, 'fortress', which may also be the name of a populated place. Therefore "Kalai" ('Kala' +'i') literally means "someone from Qal'a". Variations of the surname include Alkalai, Alqali, Elqali, Elkali, Elkalay.

Notable people with the name include:

== Surname ==
- Adam Tauman Kalai, American computer scientist
- Biswajit Kalai, Indian politician
- Ehud Kalai, prominent American game theorist and mathematical economist
- Gil Kalai (born 1955), Henry and Manya Noskwith Professor of Mathematics at the Hebrew University of Jerusalem
- Jawed Kalai, French footballer
- Hanoch Kalai (1910–1979), member of Irgun and Lehi and an expert on the Hebrew language
- Iosif Kalai (born 1980), Romanian football player of Hungarian ethnicity
- Leslie Kalai (born 1984), Papua New Guinean footballer who is a goalkeeper
- Mordecai Kalai, 17th-century Ottoman rabbi, preacher and teacher
- Yael Tauman Kalai, Israeli-American cryptographer
- Yousef el Kalai, Morocco-born Portuguese long-distance runner

== Given name ==
- Kalai Mathee (born 1959) Malaysian microbiologist
- Kalai Riadh (born 1968), Tunisian boxer
- Kalai Strode
