= Alkalai =

Alkalai (Hebrew: אלקלעי) is a surname of Sephardic Jewish origins. It is derived from Arabic Qal'a/al-Qal'a, 'fortress', which may also be the name of a populated place. Therefore "Alkalai" ('Alkala' +'i') literally means "someone from al-Qal'a". Variations of the surname include Alqali, Elqali, Elkali, Elkalay, Kalai.

Notable people with the surname include:

- Judah Alkalai (1798–1878), Ottoman Jewish religious leader & activist
- Mosko Alkalai (1931–2008), Israeli actor

== Alkalay ==
- Karen Alkalay-Gut (born 1945), an Israeli poet, professor, and editor

== Alcalay ==
- Albert Alcalay, 1917–2008) was an American abstract artist
- Ammiel Alcalay (born 1956), an American poet, scholar, critic, translator, and prose stylist
- Isaac Alcalay (1881–1978), Bulgarian Jewish leader and rabbi
- Luna Alcalay (1928–2012), a Croatian-Austrian pianist, music educator and composer
- Milos Alcalay, Venezuelan diplomat
- Reuben Alcalay, Israeli lexicographer

== See also ==
- Alkali, alkaline substance
