= Mordecai Kalai =

17th-century Ottoman rabbi and preacher

- Title: Rabbi

Personal life
- Born: Mordecai ben Solomon Kalai; 1556 Ottoman Empire
- Died: 1647 (aged 90-91)

Religious life
- Religion: Judaism

Mordecai ben Solomon Kalai (also spelled Kala'i; Hebrew: מרדכי בן שלמה קלעי; 1556 – 1647) was a 17th-century Ottoman rabbi, preacher and teacher based in Salonica (modern-day Thessaloniki, Greece). He was a prominent figure in the Sephardic Jewish community and served as head of the Portuguese yeshiva in the city.

== Biography ==
Kalai studied under several notable rabbis, including Aaron Chason, Aaron Sason and Isaac Franco. He later became the principal teacher at the Portuguese yeshiva in Salonica, where he educated many students, among them the historian David Conforte and Rabbi Daniel Estrumsa. He was a contemporary of Rabbi Abraham de Boton

Kalai endured great personal suffering. His daughter, her husband (who was also his nephew, Rabbi Mazliach Luzio, son of Rabbi Shem Tov Luzio) and their daughter all died in a plague that struck Salonica. His wife and another daughter also died during his lifetime. His student, Rabbi Moses Judah Abbas, sent him a letter containing a poem of consolation upon the death of his wife.

Kalai was considered to be a great Talmudist and well-versed in music. Much of his written work, including responsa and sermons, was lost in the Great Thessaloniki Fire of 1917.

== Legacy ==
Kalai is cited in several halakhic works of his contemporaries. He delivered a funeral sermon for Rabbi Solomon HaLevi, whose responsa (No. 10 and 29, Salonica 1652) mention Kalai. He is also referenced in:

- Mekor Chayyim by his brother Baruch Kalai
- Responsa of Joseph di Trani (No. 81)
- Peletat Bet Yehudah by Judah Lerma of Belgrade (No. 2)

Kalai is also associated with the work Lechem Mishneh, a commentary on Maimonides' Mishneh Torah by Abraham de Boton. According to Conforte, Kalai claimed that many of the glosses in the work were originally his.

== Sources ==
- David Conforte, Kore ha-Dorot (Berlin, 1846), pp. 36, 44–48, 50–52
- Chaim Joseph David Azulai, Shem ha-Gedolim, vol. I, p. 130
