= Abraham de Boton =

Talmudist and rabbi (c. 1560 – c. 1605)

Abraham Hiyya de Boton
- אברהם די בוטון

Personal life
- Born: c. 1560 Ottoman Empire
- Died: between 1603 and 1609
- Notable work(s): Lehem Mishneh; Leḥem Rav
- Occupation: Rabbi, Talmudist

Religious life
- Religion: Judaism

Abraham Hiyya de Boton (c. 1560 – c. 1605) (Hebrew: אברהם די בוטון) was a Talmudist and rabbi, a pupil of Samuel de Medina, who later dwelt for the most part at Salonica as rabbi and leader of a Talmudic academy. The name "Ḥiyya" was given him during a dangerous sickness (Ḥiyya = "life"; "may he live!"). He was for a time rabbi at Polia; in 1601 he lived in the Old Yishuv, and in 1603 was at Constantinople. He died between 1603 and 1609.

== Works ==
Even during his lifetime Boton was distinguished as a Talmudist of wide learning and acumen. His chief work is Lehem Mishneh (Double Bread; also Dispute of the Mishnah), Venice, 1609: it bears also the title Mishneh Torah. It is a commentary on Maimonides' Mishneh Torah, especially on those passages which apparently contradict the Talmud. He not only refers to such passages as had been previously noticed, but discovers a large number of others. At the same time, Boton endeavors to establish harmony between the seeming discrepancies by every possible method of interpretation. Leḥem Mishneh also contains many remarks on Maggid Mishneh, Don Vidal of Tolosa's commentary on the Mishneh Torah. The work is now widespread, and is incorporated with most editions of the Mishneh Torah that have appeared in the last two centuries. Conforte relates that his teacher Mordecai Kalai told him and other pupils that the Leḥem Mishneh was the joint work of Kalai and Boton, who were fellow-students; and Kalai is even reported to have said that most of the observations in Leḥem Mishneh were his own. This aspersion loses force through the fact that though Kalai lived in the same city, he never made this claim against Boton publicly.

Another work of Boton's was Leḥem Rav (Great Meal, or Great Dispute), responsa, published by his grandson Abraham (No. 4), Smyrna, 1660. The novellae on Baba Ḳamma in Abraham Akra's (Abraham ibn Akra) Meharere Nemerim must be the work of another and earlier Abraham de Boton.
