= Aristotelous Square =

Main city square of Thessaloniki, Greece

- Public Square
- Greek: Πλατεία Αριστοτέλους
- Former name: Alexander the Great Square
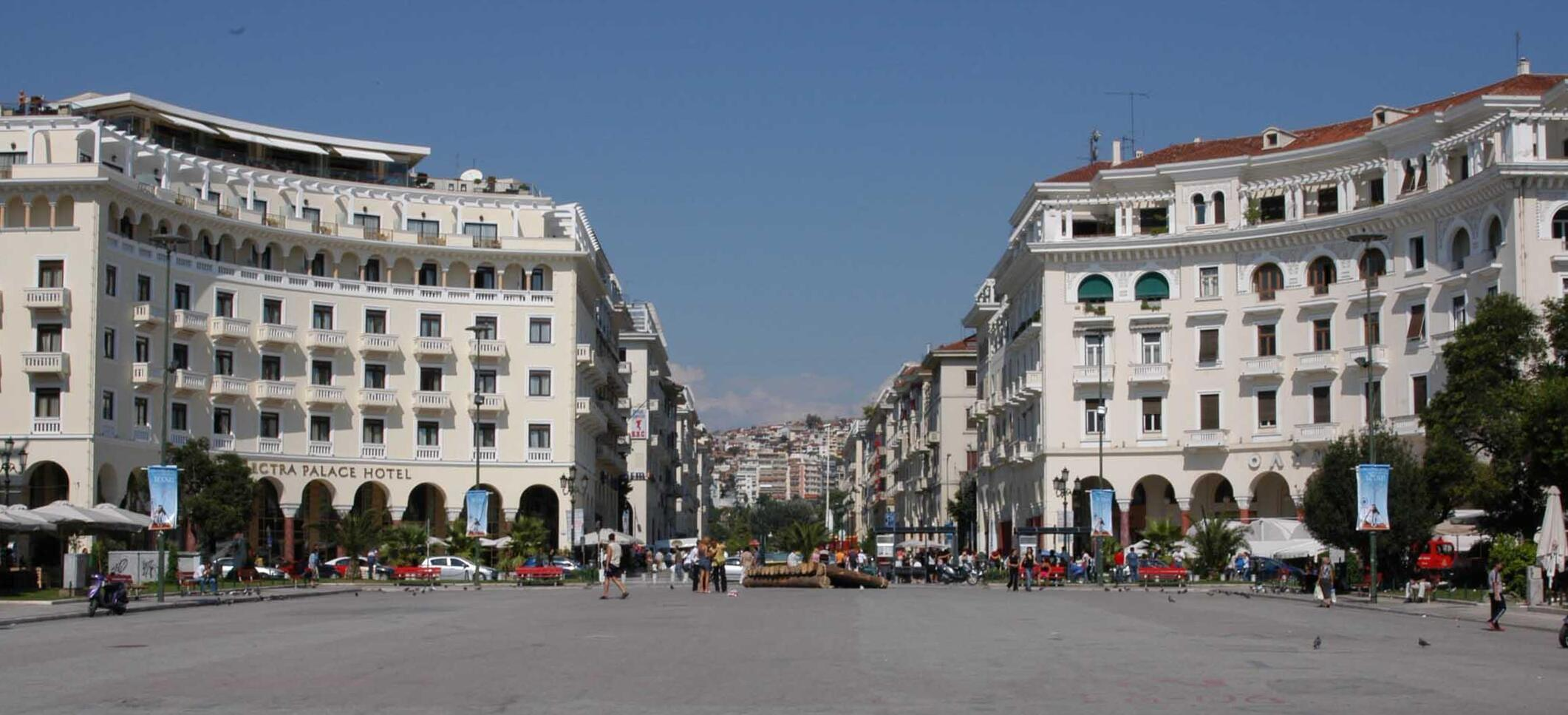
- Aristotelous Square
- Design: Ernest Hébrard
- Opened: 1920s
- Dedicated to: Aristotle
- Owner: Municipality of Thessaloniki
- Location: Thessaloniki, Greece
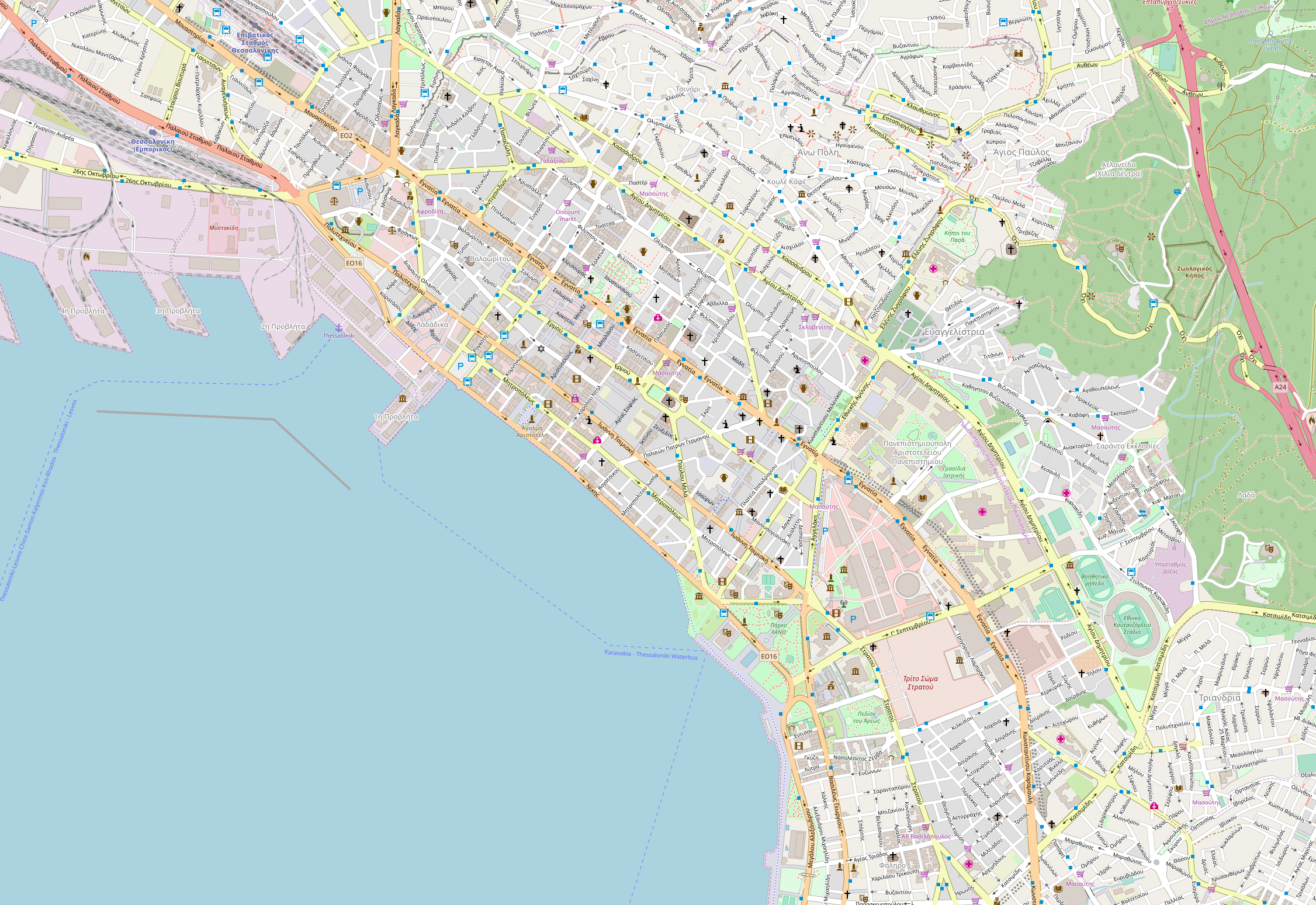
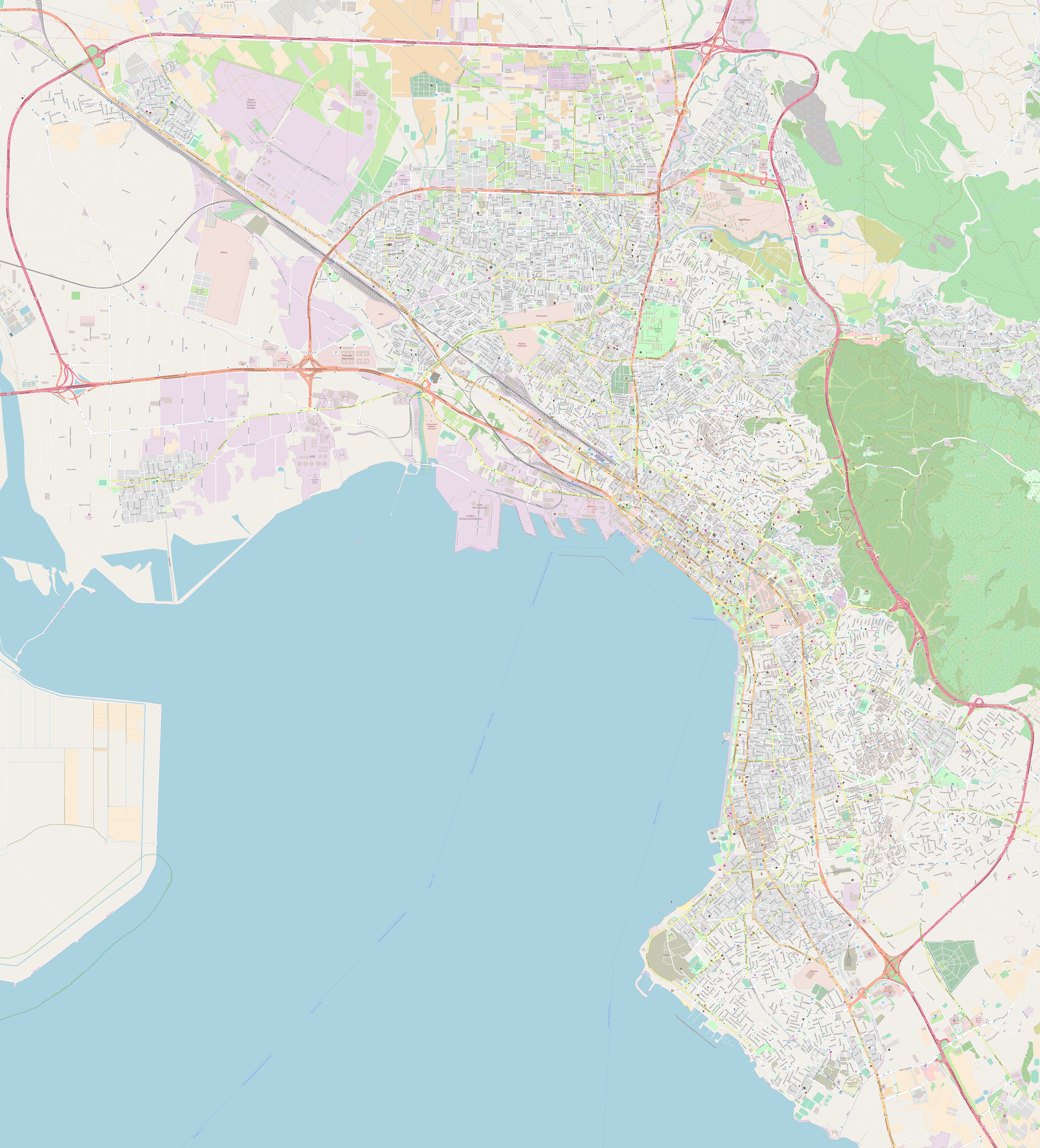
- Aristotelous Square (central Thessaloniki) Aristotelous Square (the Thessaloniki urban area) Aristotelous Square (Greece)
- Coordinates: 40°37′57″N 22°56′27″E

Aristotelous Square (Greek: Πλατεία Αριστοτέλους, IPA: [plaˈtia aristoˈtelus]), is the main city square of Thessaloniki, Greece, and is located on Nikis avenue (on the city's waterfront), in the city center. It was designed by French architect Ernest Hébrard in 1918, but most of the square was built in the 1950s. Many buildings surrounding the central square have since been renovated and its northern parts were largely restored in the 2000s.

The twelve buildings that make up Aristotelous Square have been listed buildings of Greece since 1950.

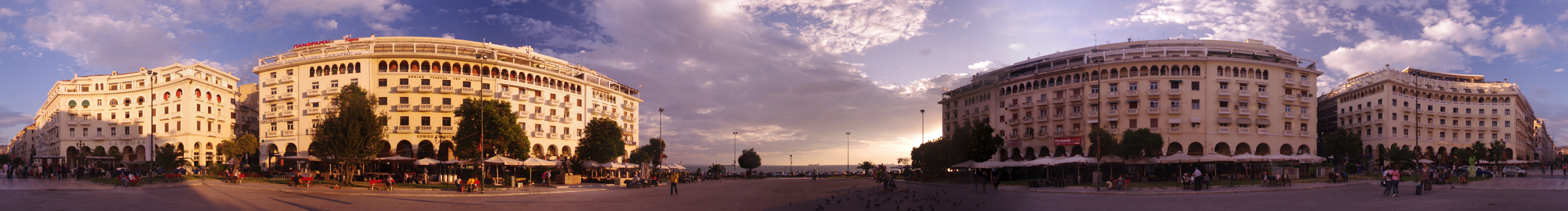
360-degree panorama of Aristotle Square

== History ==
The history of Aristotelous Square begins with the Great Fire of 1917 that destroyed two thirds of the city of Thessaloniki.

=== Before the fire ===
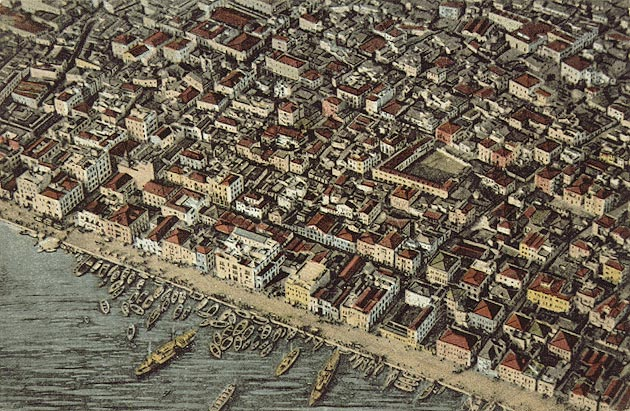
Thessaloniki in the late 19th century.

Before the Great Fire of 1917, the city lacked much of what was considered to be 'essential' in European architecture. Until 1912, Thessaloniki had been part of Ottoman Turkey for almost 500 years. Under Ottoman rule, the city grew without the guidance of a general plan for expansion and had narrow streets. The absence of squares in pre-1917 Thessaloniki was addressed by Ernest Hébrard, who proposed a number of large squares in the city, including Megalou Alexandrou Square ("Alexander the Great Square"), now Aristotelous Square.

=== Designs by Ernest Hébrard ===
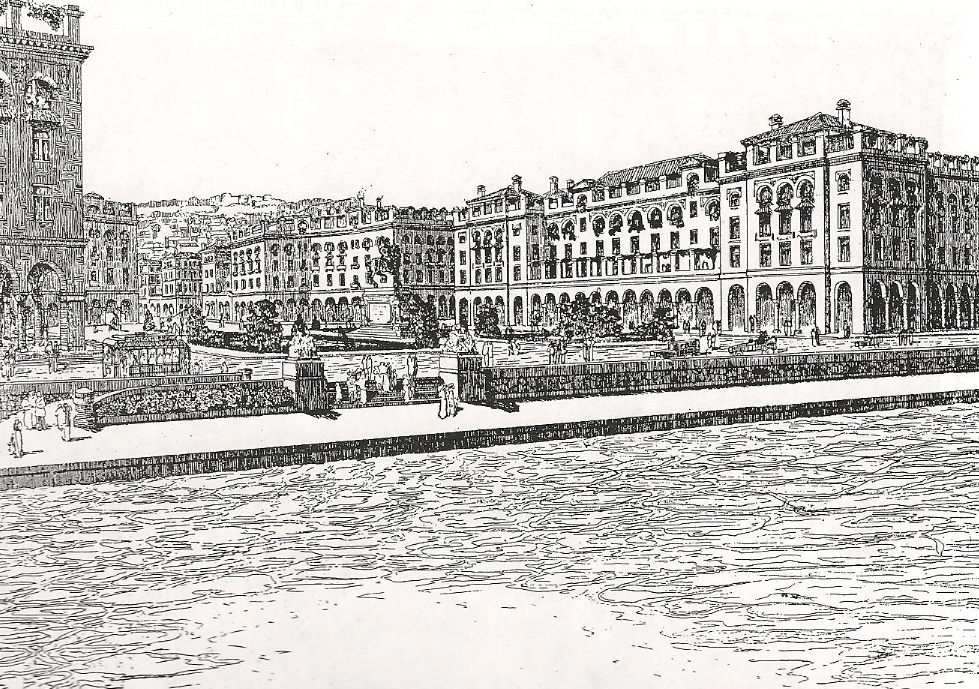
Sea-level view of Alexander the Great Square, as designed by Hébrard in 1918.

Ernest Hébrard envisioned a monumental axis for Thessaloniki that stretched from what is now Aristotelous Square on the seafront to Dikastirion Square and the Roman Forum. The axis began at Aristotelous Square, which was intended to be named after Alexander the Great. Throughout his plan for Thessaloniki, Hébrard implemented an element that was missing from the pre-1917 architecture of the city: imposing façades. For the monumental axis, the architect used elements from Byzantine and Western architecture rather than Ottoman architecture, to stress the city's connection with the Byzantine Empire. This style is most evident at Aristotelous Square, with a few building facades implementing some of Hébrard's original ideas. Additionally, a statue of Alexander the Great was to be placed in the middle of the square.

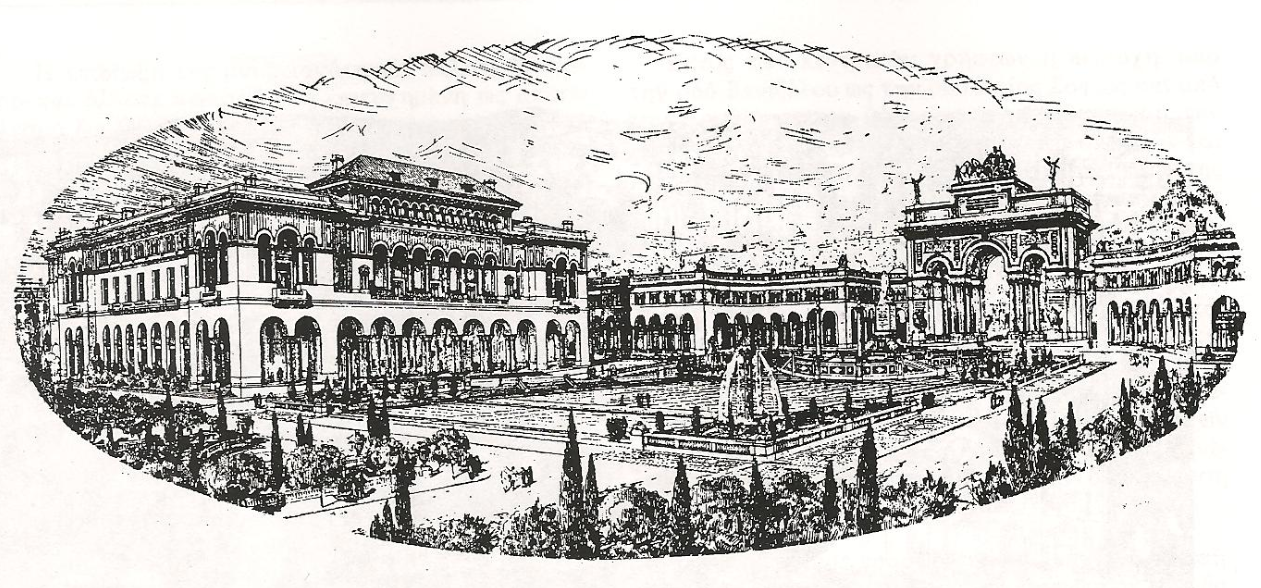
Hébrard's additional proposal for a Place Civique.

Hébrard designed the monumental axis so that looking uphill from the square one could see the city's Byzantine walls and the Upper Town. Also visible from the square would be what Hébrard called the Place Civique or Civic Square, which would be the city's administrative heart along European lines: it would feature the City Hall on the left, the court houses on the right and a grand triumphant arch leading uphill from the Civic Square. This part of the design was never realized due to a lack of funds, although following archeological excavations unearthed the ancient Roman agora at the same spot were the Civic Square was planned.

Since the first concept designs by Hébrard in 1918, his designs for Aristotelous Square were simplified considerably. Instead of the original elaborate designs, the façades that were built in the 1950s were much more modest, due to the financial situation of the country at the time and the decision of the Venizelos government in 1918 to fund the project from private sources and not the government.

=== Present day ===
Today, Aristotelous Square is one of the most famous places in all of Greece and almost synonymous with the city of Thessaloniki itself. The square plays an important role in the sociopolitical life not only of the city, but of the wider country as well. Numerous large rallies and political speeches have been organized in Aristotelous Square, such as the rally for Macedonia in 1992 (see further below). Additionally the square is used for many cultural events, such as festivals and the annual Christmas and carnival celebrations. It is an important tourist attraction for the city, and the numerous cafes and bars that line up the square make it popular with the younger generations.

The two quarter-circle sides of the square are occupied by important buildings. On the left is Electra Palace Hotel, which is one of the best five-star hotels in Thessaloniki and on the right is one of the city's most famous movie theaters, the Olympion Theatre cinema, site of the annual Thessaloniki International Film Festival. It also houses a very popular bar of the same name.

=== Future redevelopment ===
There is no redevelopment currently under consideration, but numerous proposals have been submitted over the past twenty years. When Thessaloniki became the European capital of culture during 1997, the city council put together an organizing committee for the redevelopment of the waterfront of the city, including the redevelopment of Aristotelous Square. Of the many designs that were presented to the committee, some of them were very radical and others less so. In almost all proposals, there were provisions for a marina or a similar extension of the square onto waterfront, as well as a wheel similar to the London Eye in London. Up to date, no official redevelopment scheme has been made official. The former mayor of Thessaloniki, Yannis Boutaris, had mentioned in his electoral campaign that Thessaloniki would undergo a major redevelopment to bring it into the 21st century.

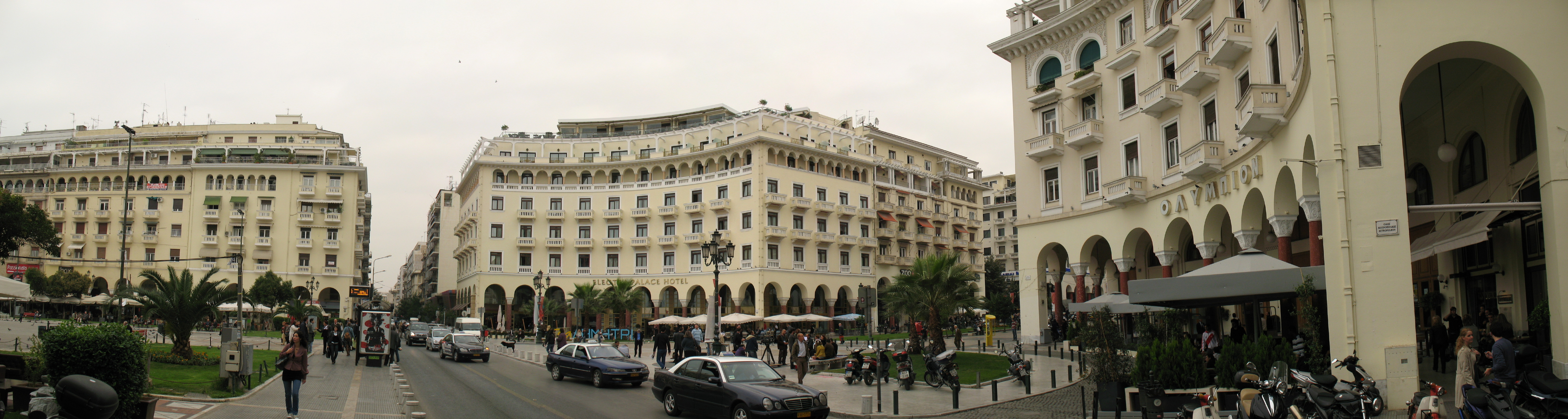
Panoramic view of Aristotelous Square.

=== Gallery ===
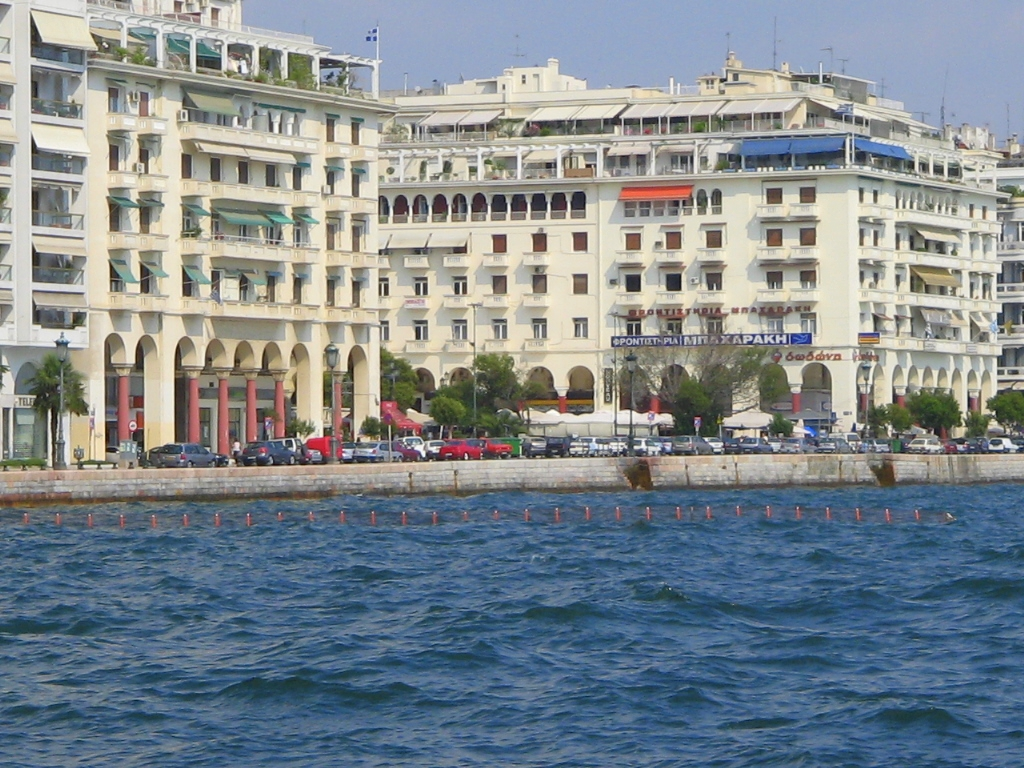
View from the sea

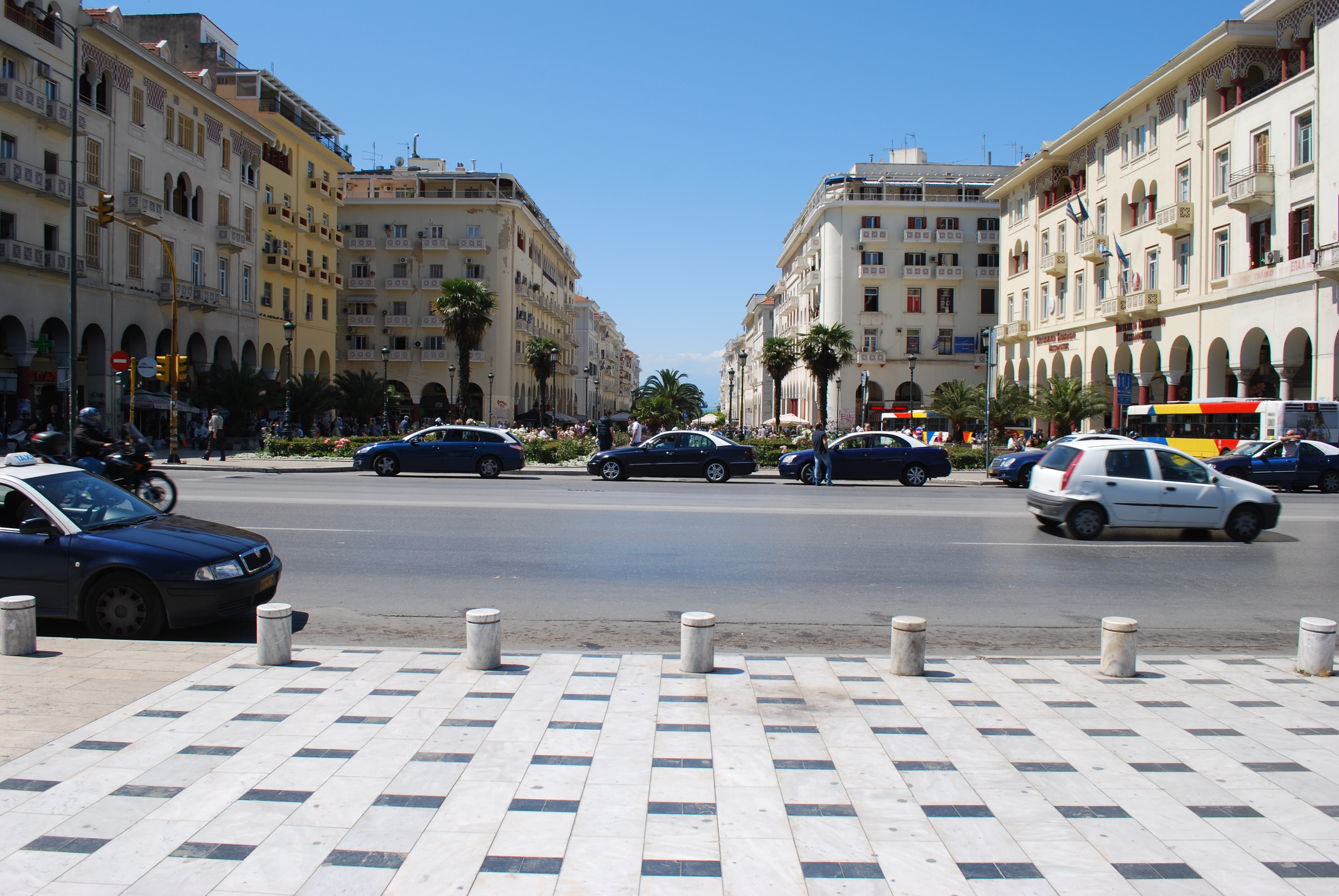
View from Egnatia Street

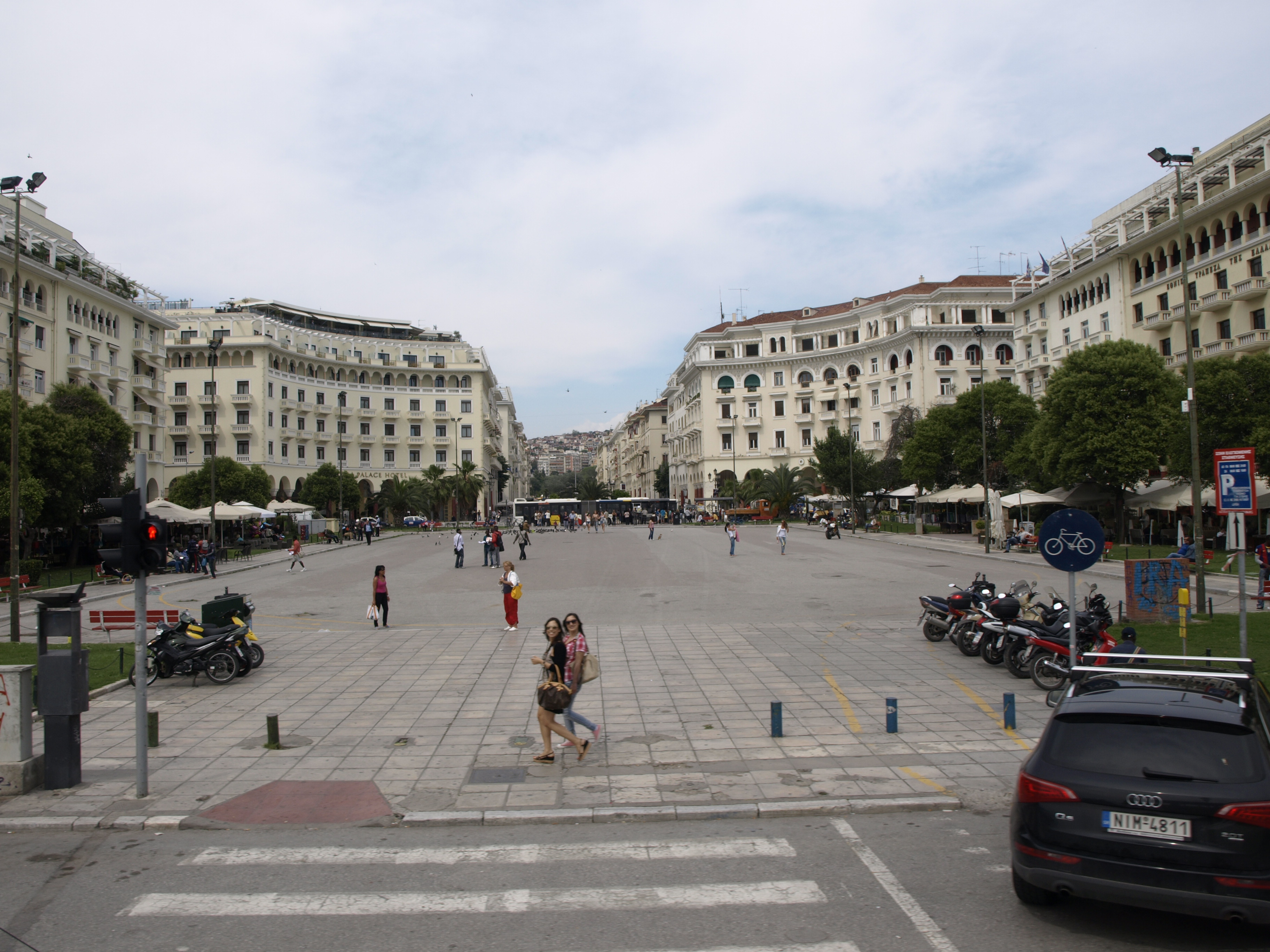
View of the square

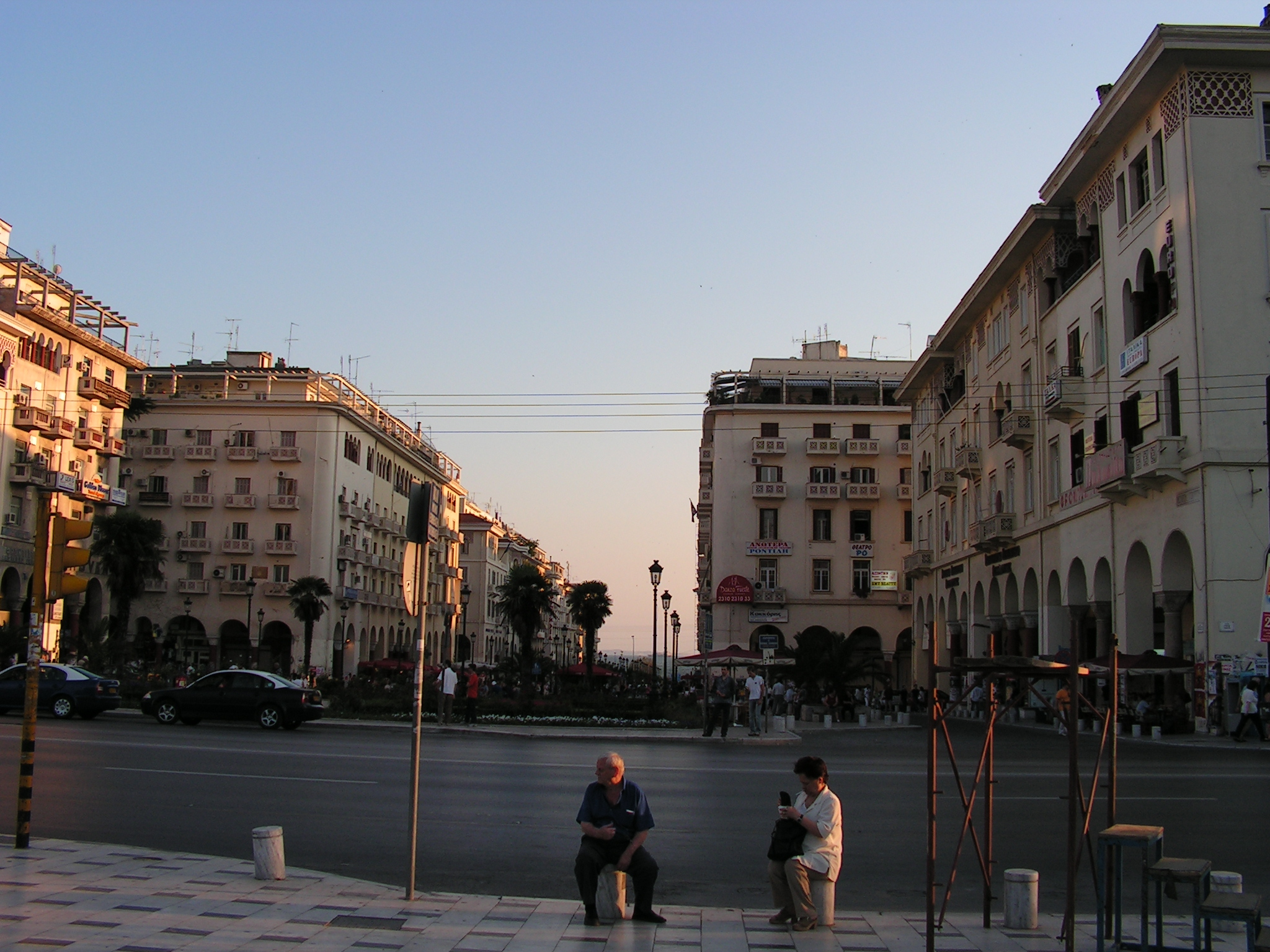
Upper Aristotelous Square, where the Place Civique was to be located

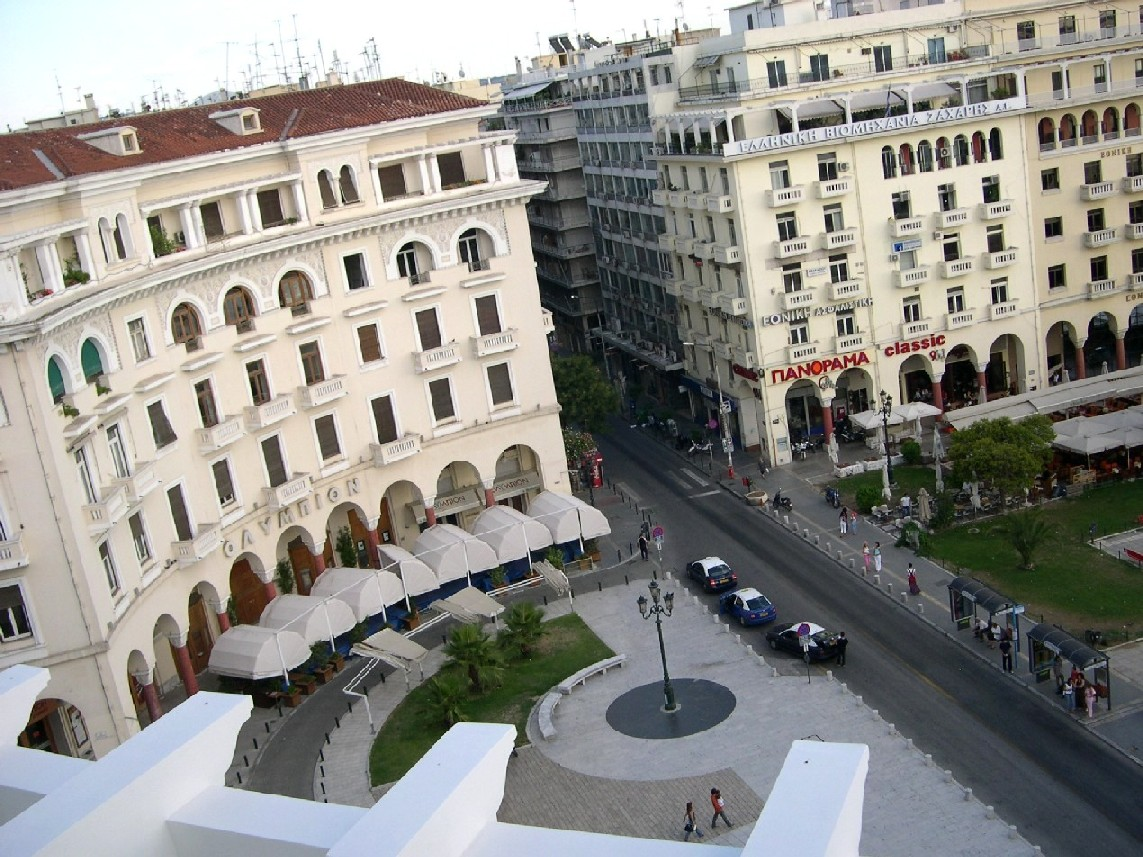
View of Olympion Cinema (architect Jacques Moshé) from the top of Electra Palace Hotel

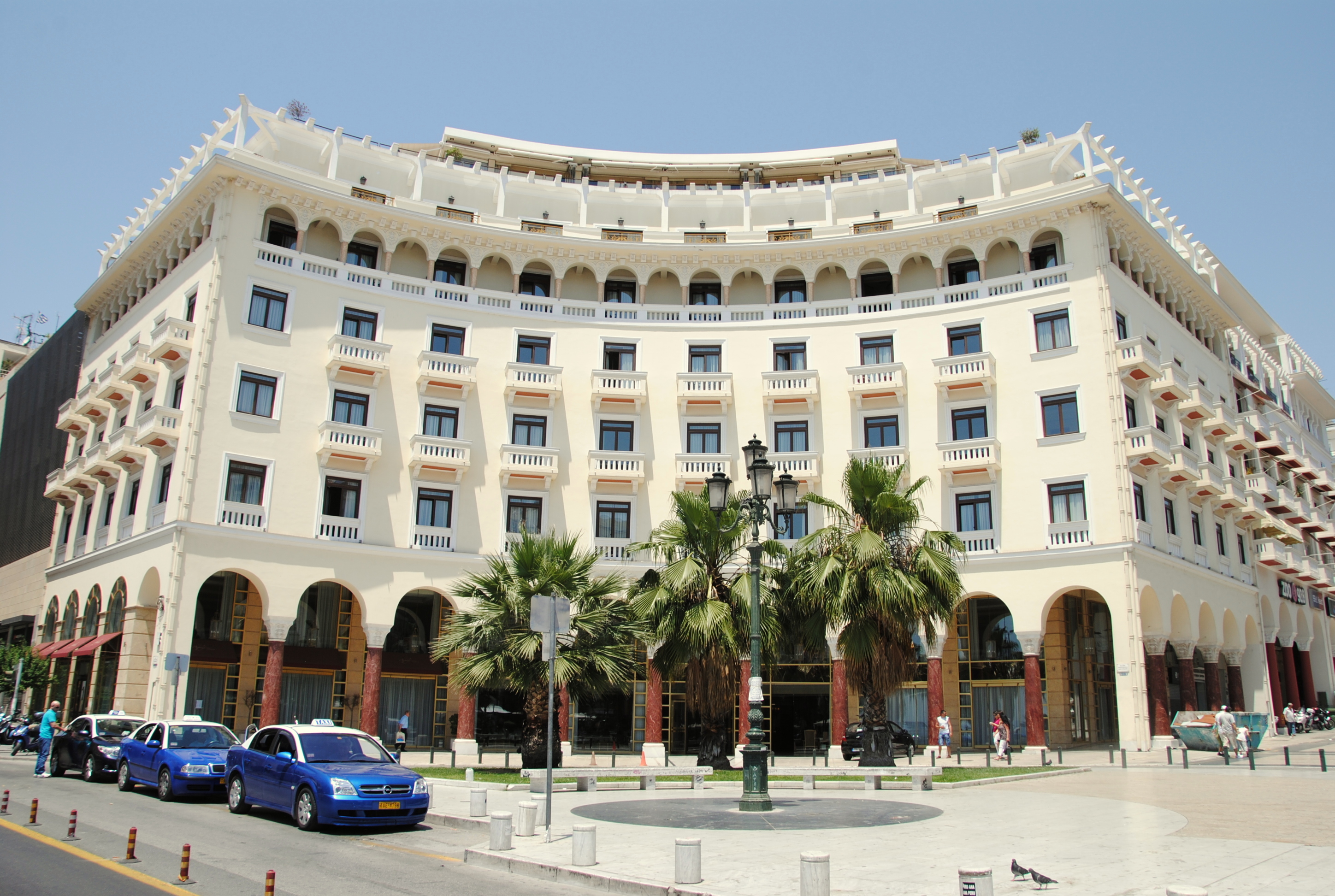
Electra Palace

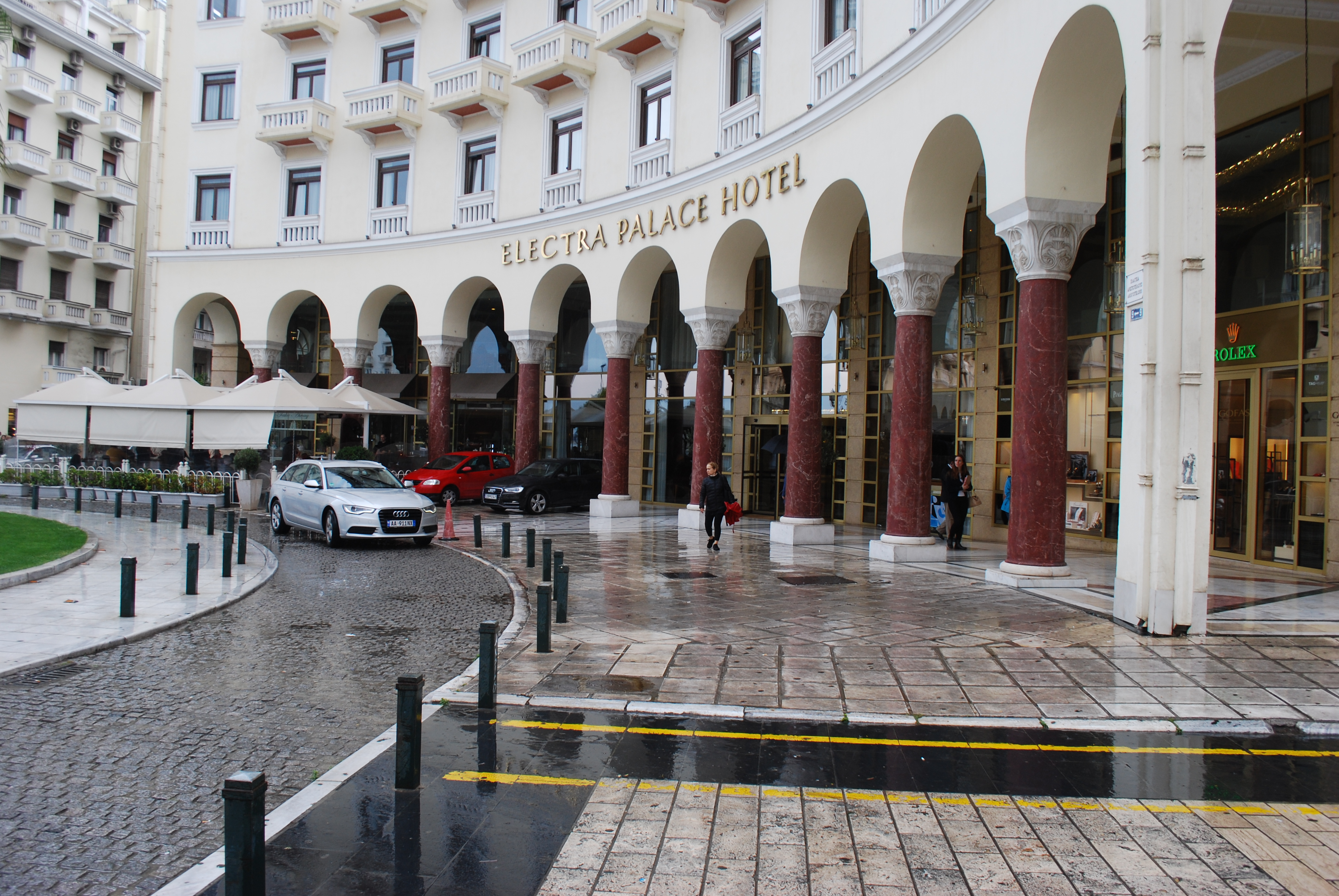
Arcades

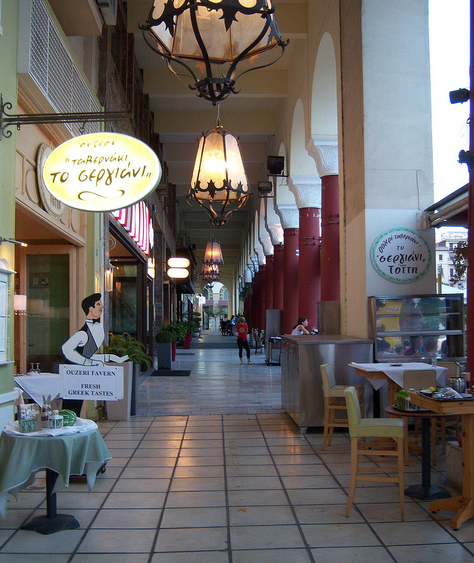
Cafes and restaurants that line up the sides of the square

== Uses ==
=== Christmas and New Year ===
Due to its location in the heart of the city, the square is used for almost all major celebrations, including that of the lighting of the official Christmas tree of Thessaloniki and the New Year countdown. Every year the municipality organizes the Celebration of the Angels (Greek: Γιορτή των Αγγέλων), which is the official lighting ceremony for the Christmas tree and is accompanied by other festive activities, including bands, choirs, popular Greek singers and fireworks displays. Similar celebrations are organized annually on New Year's Eve and New Year's Day.

Following Greek traditions, apart from a Christmas tree, the municipality of Thessaloniki also decorates a giant Christmas ship, which is a Greek variant of the custom of decorating a Christmas tree. Both the Christmas tree and the Christmas boat are over 20 meters tall and are considered a tourist attraction for visitors to the city at the time they are up.

=== Political activity ===
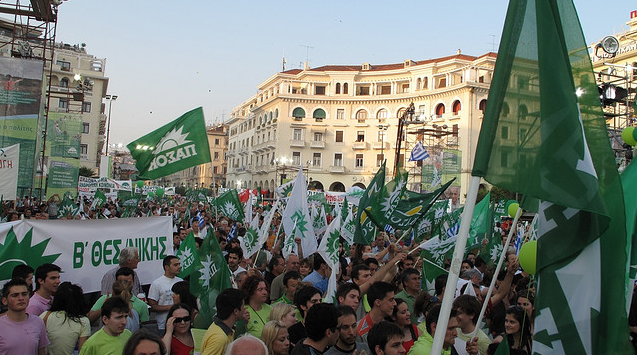
A political rally organized by the Panhellenic Socialist Movement in Aristotelous Square.

A map of Aristotelous Square and the surrounding areas from OpenStreetMap.

Since its creation, the square has been used for a number of important party rallies. Many former Prime Ministers of Greece have given their main address from Aristotelous Square, including Andreas Papandreou, Costas Karamanlis and George Papandreou.

Apart from partisan action, there have also been numerous demonstrations in the square that were not backed by any particular party. Under the nationalist rush against the Republic of Macedonia in the early 1990s over the Macedonia naming dispute, a huge demonstration was organized in the square in February 1992 "to show support for the Greekness of Macedonia". During the NATO bombing of Yugoslavia, a large demonstration also took place in the square that reaffirmed the Greek people's disapproval of the NATO bombing and to show their support for the Serbian people. Many other demonstrations have been held in the square in recent years on a variety of subjects ranging from religious affairs, education reforms and the economic crisis.

== Transportation ==
When the first buildings in the square were constructed in the late 1950s, the square was served by Thessaloniki's extensive tram network but the service was discontinued in 1957. Since then, the square has been served primarily by the buses of the Thessaloniki Urban Transport Organization (OASTH). The city's horse shoe shape and the square's location within the city center make it easily reachable by OASTH, with many lines passing either through Aristotelous or by Venizelou Square. Additionally, there are taxi stands on Mitropoleos Street (a street which "cuts" the square in half), in front of the Olympion Theatre.

The Venizelou station of the Thessaloniki Metro, which opened in November 2023, is within walking distance of the square on Egnatia Avenue. Other means of transportation that have been proposed are ferry services to the other pivotal points of coastal Thessaloniki.

== In popular culture ==
A redesign concept from the late 1980s.

Because of its resemblance to a bottle when viewed from above, an aerial photograph of the square was recently used in an advertisement for Absolut Vodka.
