= Ernest Hébrard =

19/20th-century French architect, archaeologist and urban planner

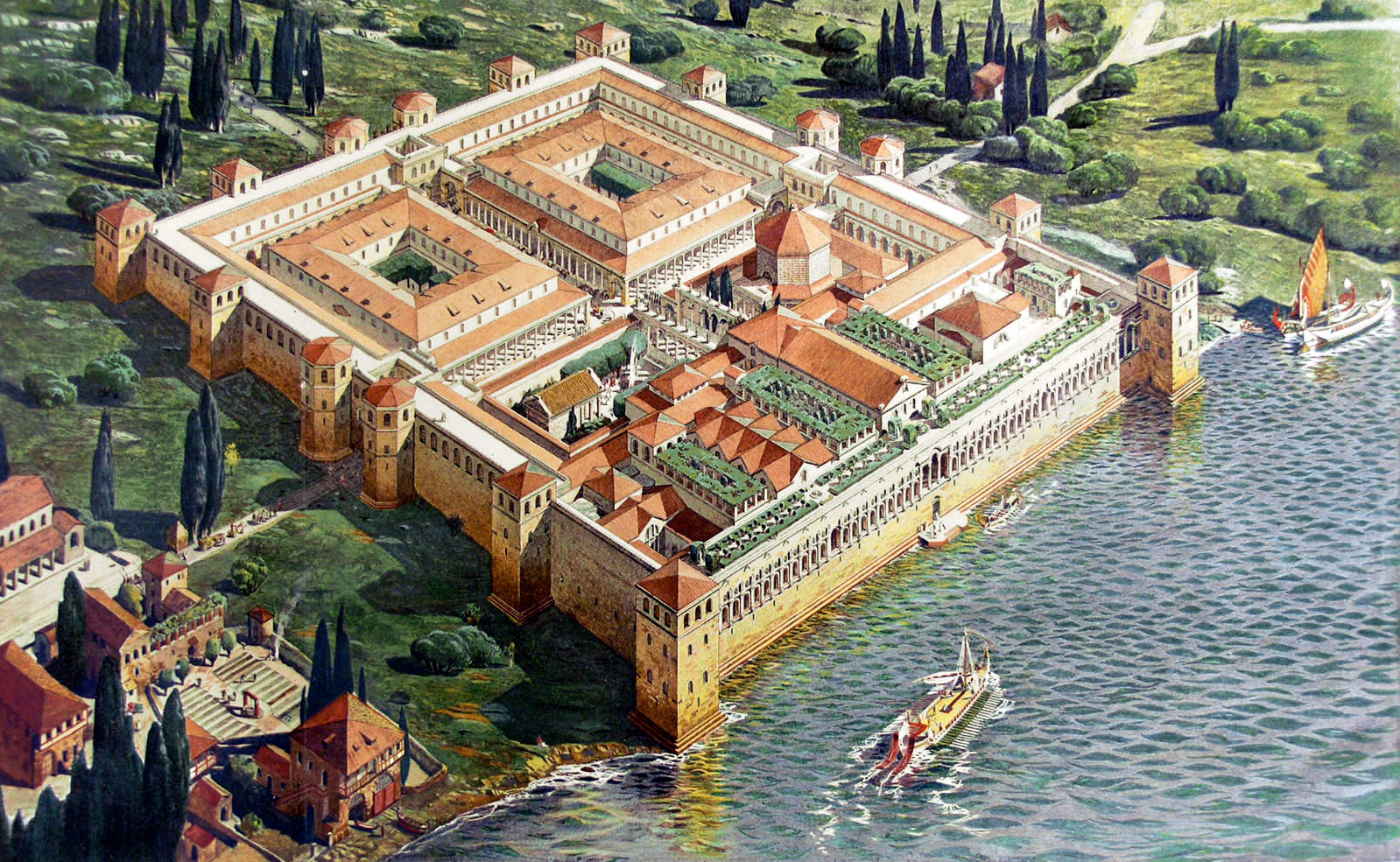
Reconstruction of the Palace of the Roman Emperor Diocletian in its original appearance upon completion in 305 AD, by Ernest Hébrard

Ernest Hébrard (1875–1933) was a French architect, archaeologist and urban planner, best known for his urban plan for the center of Thessaloniki, Greece, after the great fire of 1917.

== Background ==
Hebrard studied at the École des Beaux-Arts, and in 1904 won the Grand Prix de Rome, allowing him to study at the Académie de France in Rome, located in the Villa Medici. It was here that he chose to study Diocletian's palace at Split, eventually leading to the 1912 publication of a monograph containing what is still regarded as the most accurate image of the original appearance of the Palace. At the Academie, he was a few years behind Henri Prost, later famed as the planner of Casablanca, and together with other members of the reformist Musée social, he developed an interest in the possibilities of town planning.

In 1913, he published with Hendrik Christian Andersen their enormous project (the text weighed over ten pounds) of A World Center of Communication, a perfect "World City," filled with art, which would motivate humanity to achieve a near-Utopian state.

== Work in Greece ==
During WW1, in 1916, Hebrard had been conscripted as the Director of the Archaeological Service of the Army of the Orient based in Thessaloniki, and so was present when the majority of the city was largely destroyed in the Great Fire of 1917. The Greek Prime Minister Eleftherios Venizelos forbade the reconstruction of the city center until a modern city plan was approved. He commissioned Ernest Hébrard for the work, which the architect conceived and developed with the aid of the Greek architects Aristotelis Zachos and Konstantinos Kitsikis, as well as British designer Thomas Hayton Mawson and fellow Frenchman Joseph Pleyber. The plan did away with the medieval and Ottoman street layout, imposing instead a plan of formal boulevards, in a symmetrical pattern about a central axis, carefully composed around the most important ancient Byzantine churches and mosques. Hébrard taught at the National Technical University of Athens, and his work is well known in the architecture schools of Greece.

== Work in Indochina ==
In 1921, he was appointed the head of the Indochina Architecture and Town Planning Service, based in Hanoi, the capital of French Indochina, at first charged with planning the hill station of Da Lat in Annam, Vietnam's middle province. He participated in the planning new districts or urban improvements of several other cities in the region, including Hanoi itself. He also designed a number of prominent buildings, including the eclectically styled Martyr's Church, popularly known as the Cửa Bắc Church, in central Hanoi in the late 1920s (completed c1931), but he is particularly noted for a series of government buildings that worked to incorporate elements of vernacular design from French Indochina into modern structures. They include :

- Hanoi University of Pharmacy, originally the Hanoi Medical University, built 1926.
- Ministry of Foreign Affairs, originally built as the Indochina Ministry of Finance, 1924–28.
- National Museum of Vietnamese History, originally the French School of the Far East, built 1926–31, and intended to house the archeological collections of the school.
- Lê Hồng Phong High School, originally Lycee Petrus Ký, District 5, Ho Chi Minh City, 1925–28.
- Hotel Le Royal, Phnom Penh, Cambodia, proposed 1924, opened 1929 (with Jean Desbois).

In 1930, he presented a project for the building of a university in Salonika, and in 1931 he returned to Paris, where he died at the age of 58 two years later.

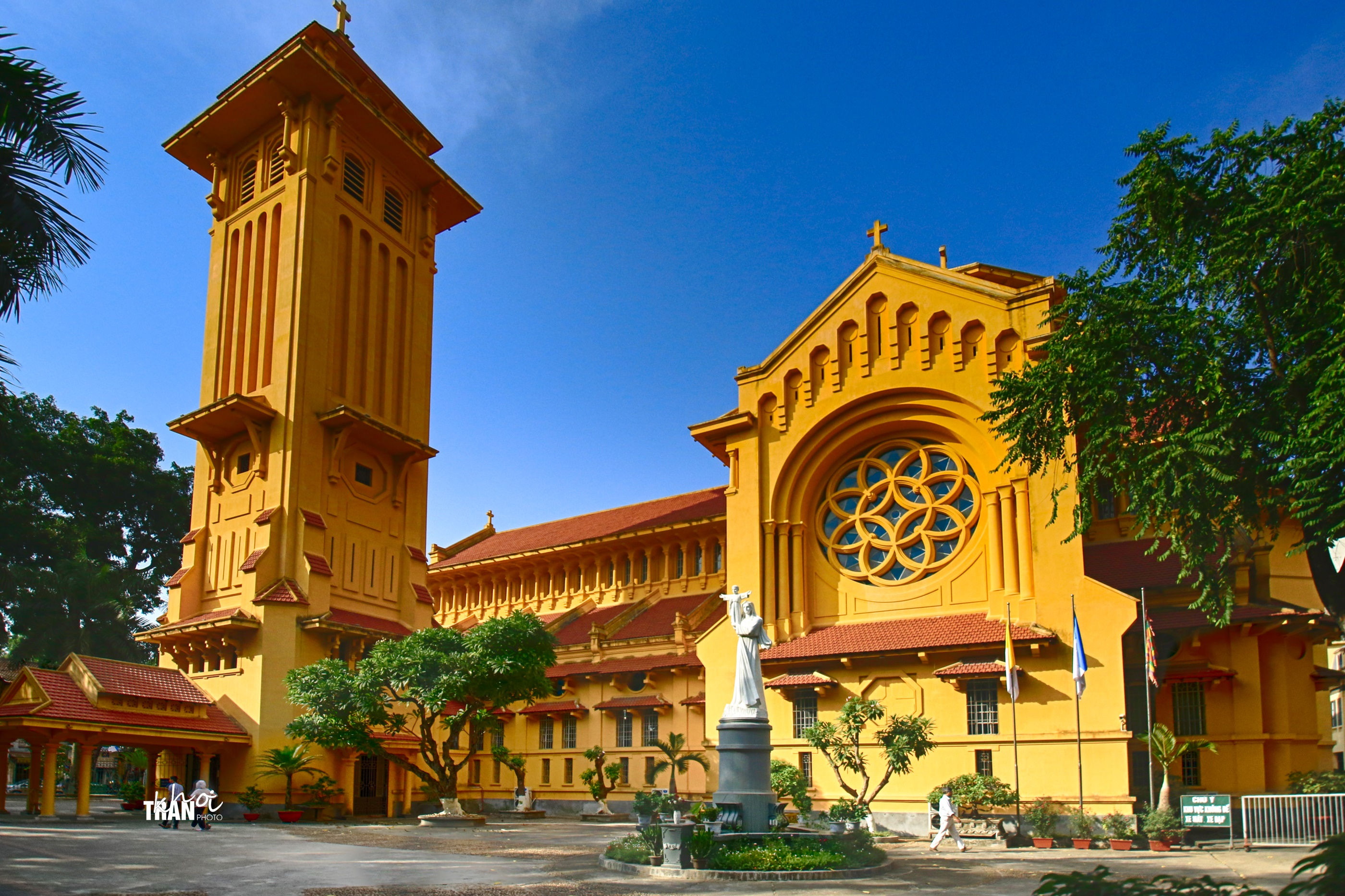
Martyr's Church, Cửa Bắc Church, c.1929-31

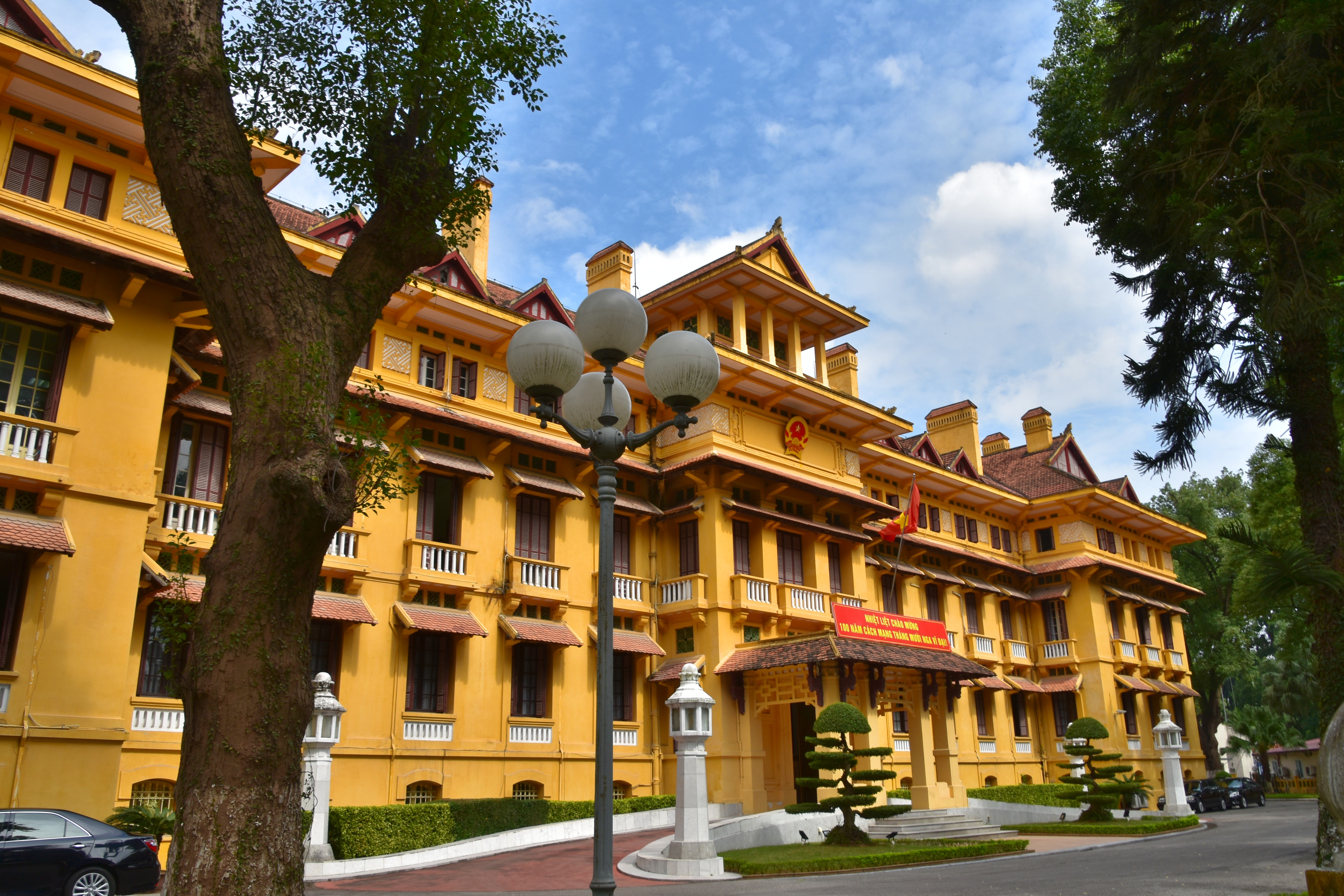
Indochina Ministry of Finance, now Ministry of Foreign Affairs, 1924–28

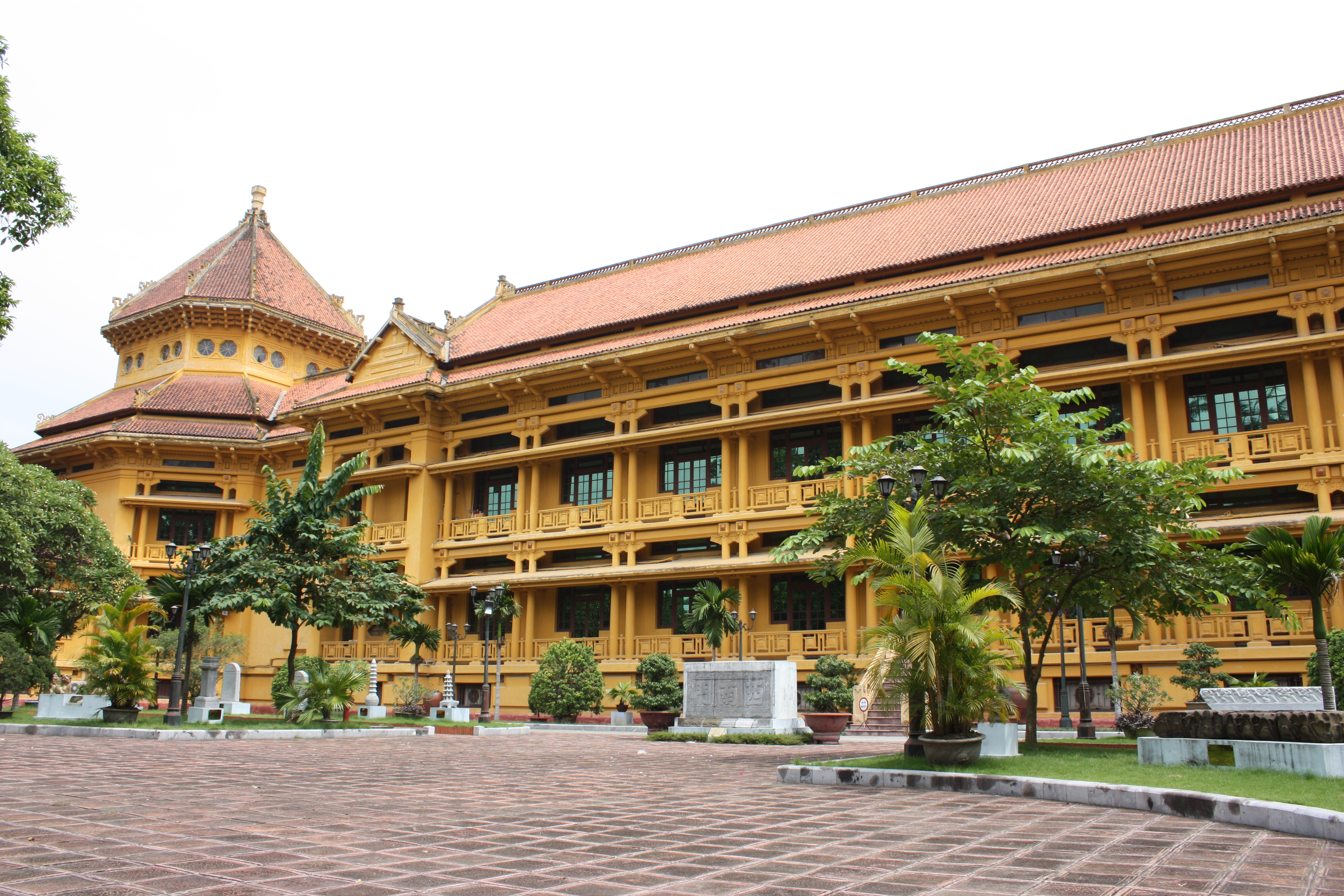
French School of the Far East, now National Museum of Vietnamese History, 1928–32

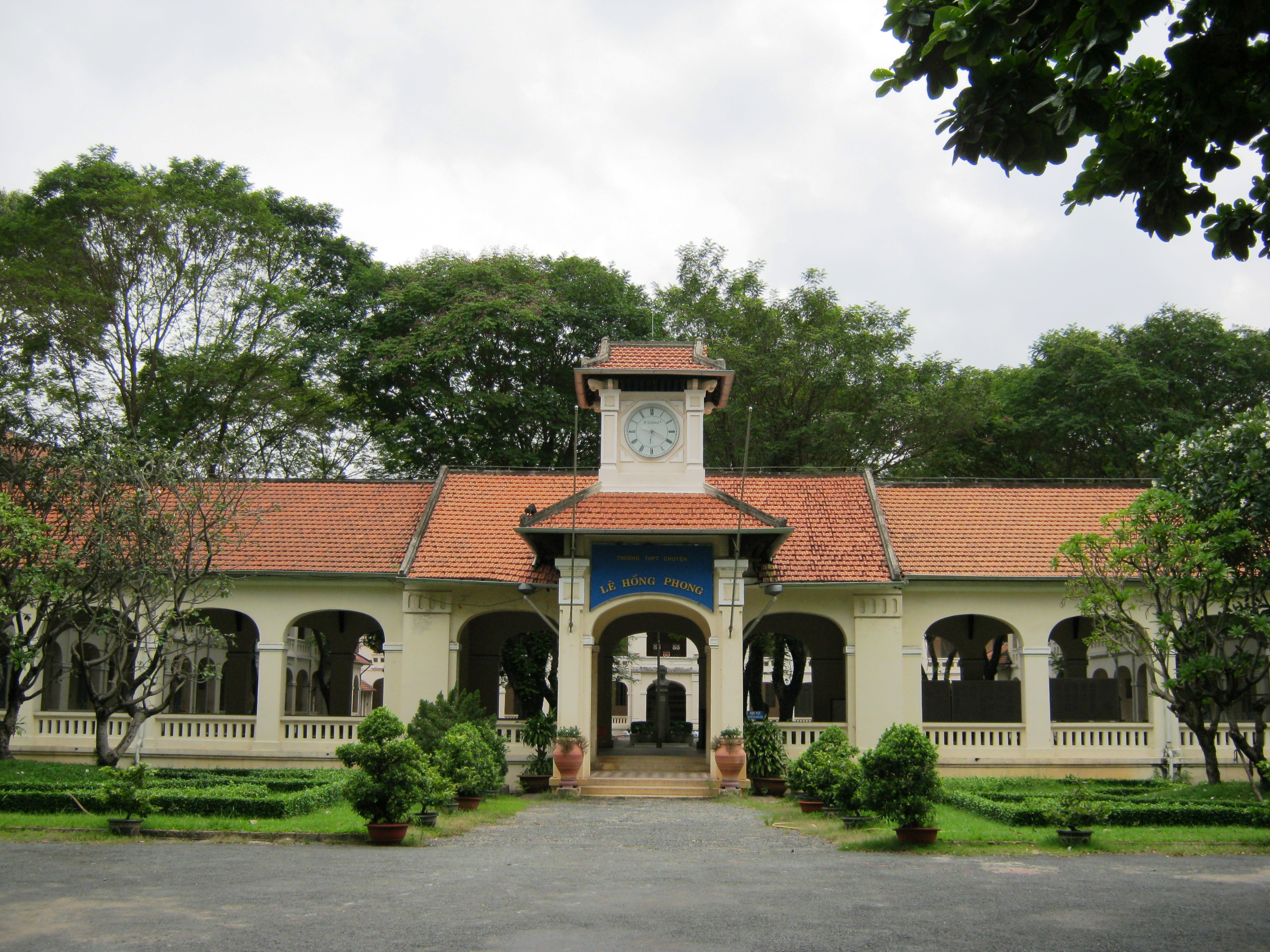
Lycee Petrus Ký now Lê Hồng Phong High School, 1925–28

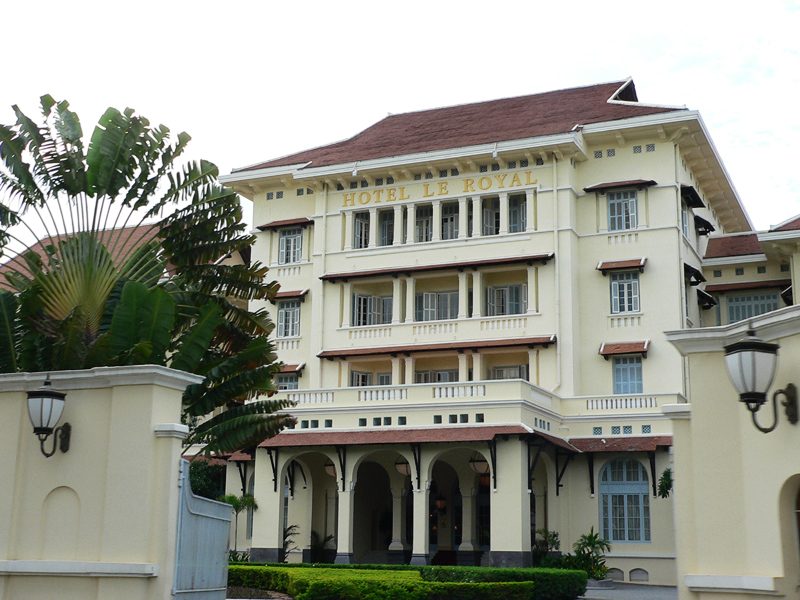
Hotel Le Royal, Phnom Penh, 1924–29

== See also ==
- Aristotelous Square
