= Great Thessaloniki Fire of 1917 =

1917 fire which destroyed two-thirds of Thessaloniki, Greece

Coordinates: 40.635°N 22.940°E

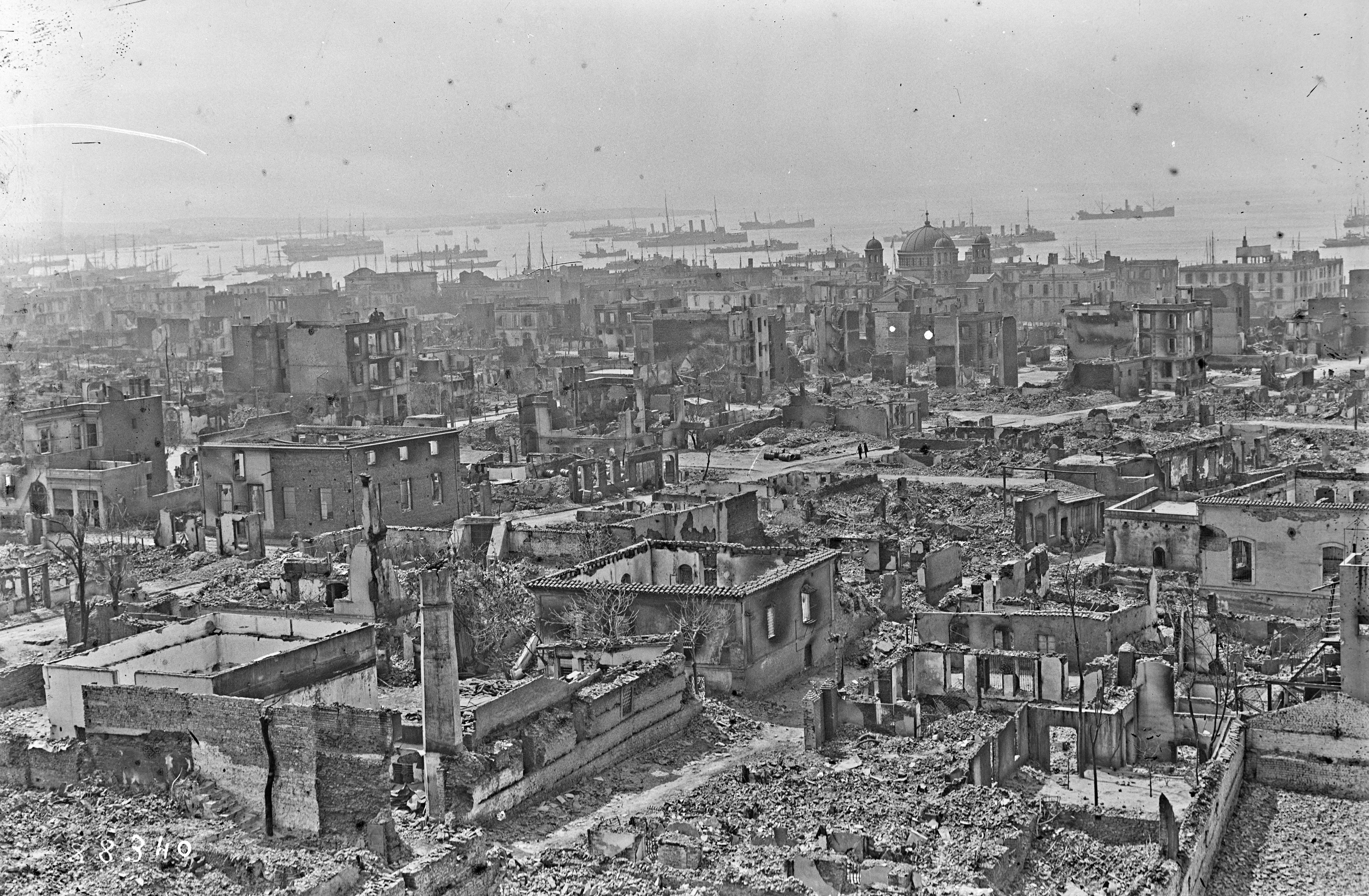
Aftermath of the fire

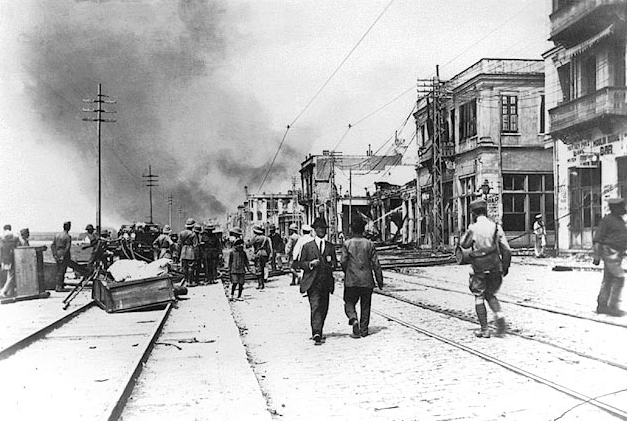
The fire as seen from the quay in 1917.

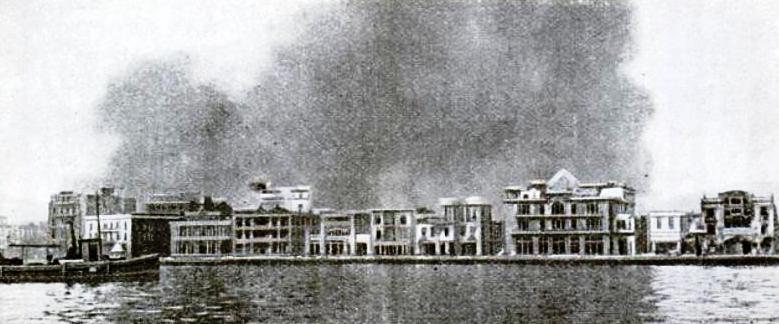
The fire as seen from the Thermaic Gulf.

The Great Thessaloniki Fire of 1917 (Greek: Μεγάλη Πυρκαγιά της Θεσσαλονίκης, 1917) began as an accidental kitchen fire and ended up as a massive conflagration, destroying two thirds of the city of Thessaloniki, the second-largest city in Greece, leaving more than 70,000 homeless. The fire burned for 32 hours and destroyed 9,500 houses within an extent of 1 square kilometer. Half the Jewish population emigrated from the city as their livelihoods were gone. Rather than quickly rebuilding, the government commissioned the French architect Ernest Hébrard to design a new urban plan for the burned areas and for the future expansion of the city. His designs are still evident in the city, most notably Aristotelous Square, although some of his most grandiose plans were never completed due to a lack of funds. French navy official Dufour de la Thuillerie writes in his report that "I saw Thessaloniki, a city of more than 150,000 people, burn".

== The city before the fire ==
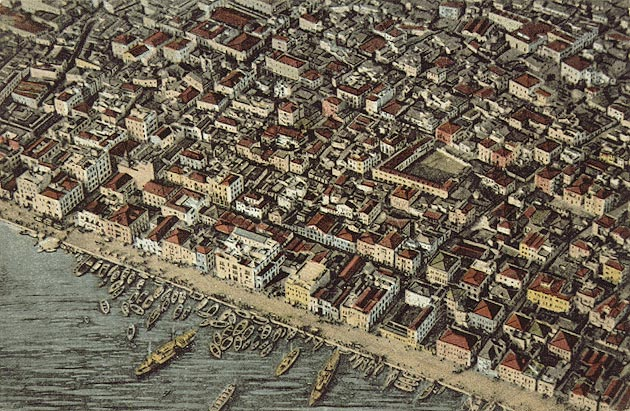
Thessaloniki (Selânik) in the late 1800s, when it was part of the Ottoman Empire.

Thessaloniki was one of the largest and most modern cities in Europe by Balkan standards at the time of the fire. By European standards, the city's planning was chaotic and the unhygienic conditions that prevailed in the poorer areas were described as "unacceptable" by the government in Athens. The city's harbour was one of the most important centres of trade in the region. In 1912 the city, along with the biggest part of Macedonia and Epirus, was incorporated in Greece after almost 500 years of Ottoman rule. The population of the city was essentially maintained: the larger part of the population were Sephardi Jews, followed by Greeks, Turks, Bulgarians, Roma and others.

As soon as World War I began in 1914, Greece officially maintained neutrality. With authorization by the Venizelos' government, Entente Forces had landed troops in Thessaloniki in 1915, in order to support their Serb allies in the Macedonian Front. In August 1916, Venizelist officers launched an uprising that resulted in the establishment of the Provisional Government of National Defence in the city, essentially dividing Greece into two sovereign states, one represented by Eleftherios Venizelos, and the other by King Constantine. After King Constantine abdicated in June 1917, Greece was reunified again and entered officially the war with the Allies side.

Thessaloniki soon became a transit center for Allied troops and supplies, and the city filled with thousands of French and British soldiers, numbering up to 200,000. The 1913 census recorded a population of 150,000 people. (Note: In 1917, the population of the city was recorded to be around 278,000, while in the 1920 census, a population of 170,000 is recorded. The 1917 record is seen as not entirely correct, with a typographical error being highly likely: a population of 178,000 seems more plausible.)

== The fire ==
=== Start of the fire ===
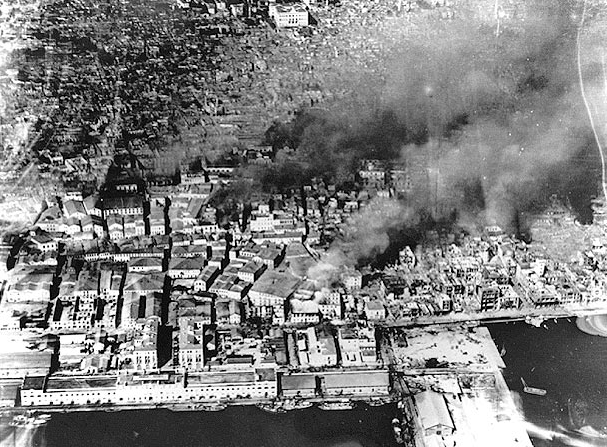
Aerial picture of the fire.

The fire began on Saturday 5 (OS, Julian Calendar) /18 (NS) August 1917 at roughly 15:30, by accident at a small house of refugees at Olympiados 3, in the Mevlane district between the center and the Upper City when a housewife, living in the dense district, tried to cook eggplants. A spark from the kitchen fire fell in a pile of straw and ignited it. Due to both lack of water and indifference, the initial fire was not put out. Eventually, an intense wind carried the fire to the neighboring houses, and it continued throughout central Thessaloniki. As the centre of operations for Allied Forces in the Balkans during World War I, Thessaloniki had no fire service and its water supply was requisitioned by foreign soldiers – which, along with the intense wind and wooden structures, is why the Great Fire attained historic proportions.

Initially the fire followed two directions, to the Residency via the road of Agiou Dimitriou, and to the market via the Leontos Sofou road. The Residency was saved by its employees, who hurried to help. The wind strengthened and continued to spread the fire towards the center of the city. In the early morning of the next day (6/19 August), the wind changed direction and the two fronts of the fire destroyed the whole commercial center. At 12:00, the fire passed around the grounds of the church of Haghia Sophia without burning it, and continued eastward up to the road of Ethnikis Amynis (former name: Hamidie), where it stopped. On the evening of that day the fire completely died out.

=== Efforts at firefighting ===
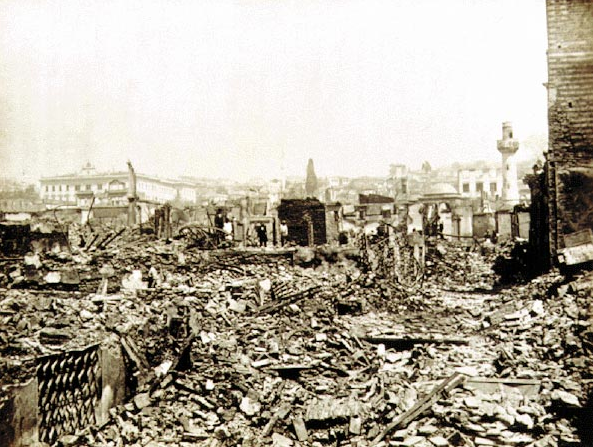
Destruction caused by the fire, with the Ministry for Macedonia and Thrace in the background.

There was not enough water for firefighting because (to serve their camps and hospitals in the suburbs of the city) the Allied forces controlled water reserves, which were reduced due to the drought of that summer and the high water consumption of the growing population. More significantly, the city government did not have an organized fire brigade; a few firefighting teams were privately owned by insurance companies that protected only their subscribers. The private firefighters were found to be unorganized and equipped with old or no equipment. Additionally, Allied detachments, while trying to stop the fire and attempting to create Fire Safe Zones, accidentally exploded entire blocks and exacerbated the fire.

== Destruction ==
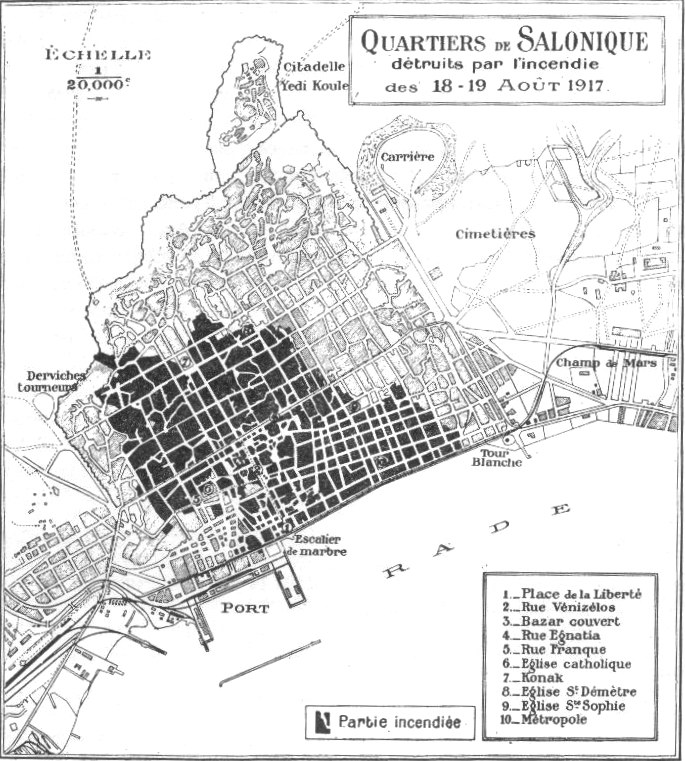
A map showing the huge area destroyed by the fire.

The fire destroyed 32% of Thessaloniki, about 1 square kilometer. The burned region was between the roads of Aghiou Dimitriou, Leontos Sofou, Nikis, Ethnikis Amynis, Alexandrou Svolou, and Egnatia (from Aghia Sofia). This region is reported in official documents as "burned zone" (Greek: πυρίκαυστος ζώνη, pirikafstos zoni) and in the popular narrations simply as "the burned" (Greek: τα καμμένα, ta kammena). The extent of material damage within Thessaloniki was calculated to be worth 8,000,000 golden pounds.

Included among buildings that were burned were the Post Office, the telegraph office, the town hall, the water supply, and gas company headquarters, the Ottoman Bank, the National Bank of Greece, the deposits of the Bank of Athens, parts of the Saint Demetrius church, the monastery of Saint Theodora and another church, the Saatli Mosque, 11 other mosques, the seat of the chief rabbi with all its archive, 16 of the 33 synagogues, and the printing-houses of most newspapers. Thessaloniki had the highest number of published newspapers in Greece, but after the fire most did not manage to rebuild their businesses and publish again. Approximately 4,096 of the 7,695 shops within the city were destroyed and 70% of the workforce was unemployed.

=== Care of fire victims ===
The people affected by the fire totaled approximately 73,447. The Pallis Report identified the homeless by the three religious communities of Thessaloniki: 52,000 Jews, 10,000 Orthodox and 11,000 Muslims. Other sources give a number of 64,000 total.

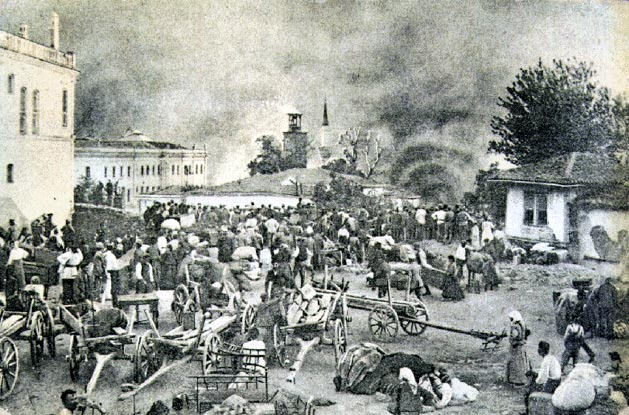
Refugees after the fire.

The care for the fire victims started immediately: Greek authorities constructed 100 houses to shelter 800 families. The British authorities established three settlements with 1,300 tents, where they accommodated 7,000 homeless. The French authorities set up a settlement for 300 families, and built the Union of French Ladies, a smaller camp for 100 families. Together they transported 5,000 people by train for free and relocated the refugees to Athens, Volos and Larissa. The Greek authorities set up distribution points providing free bread to 30,000 individuals. The American, French, and British Red Cross distributed food among the homeless. Nearly half the city's Jews, having lost both homes and shops, soon emigrated to western countries, mainly France and the United States, while some emigrated to Palestine.

Pericles A. Argyropoulos, the major government representative, founded the Administration for Victims of Fire for the care of thousands of fire victims; and the government approved credit of 1,500,000 drachmas for the first needs. Simultaneously, the Central Committee for Donations was organized, with a line of sub-committees for the collection of donations and the distribution of money and goods.

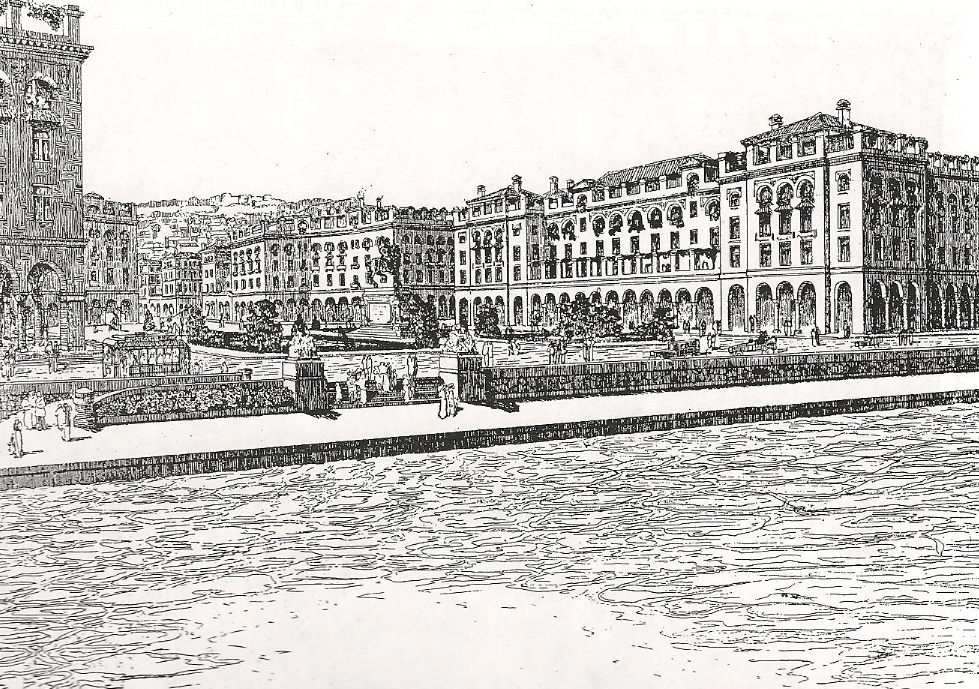
The plans for Alexander the Great Square by Ernest Hebrard.

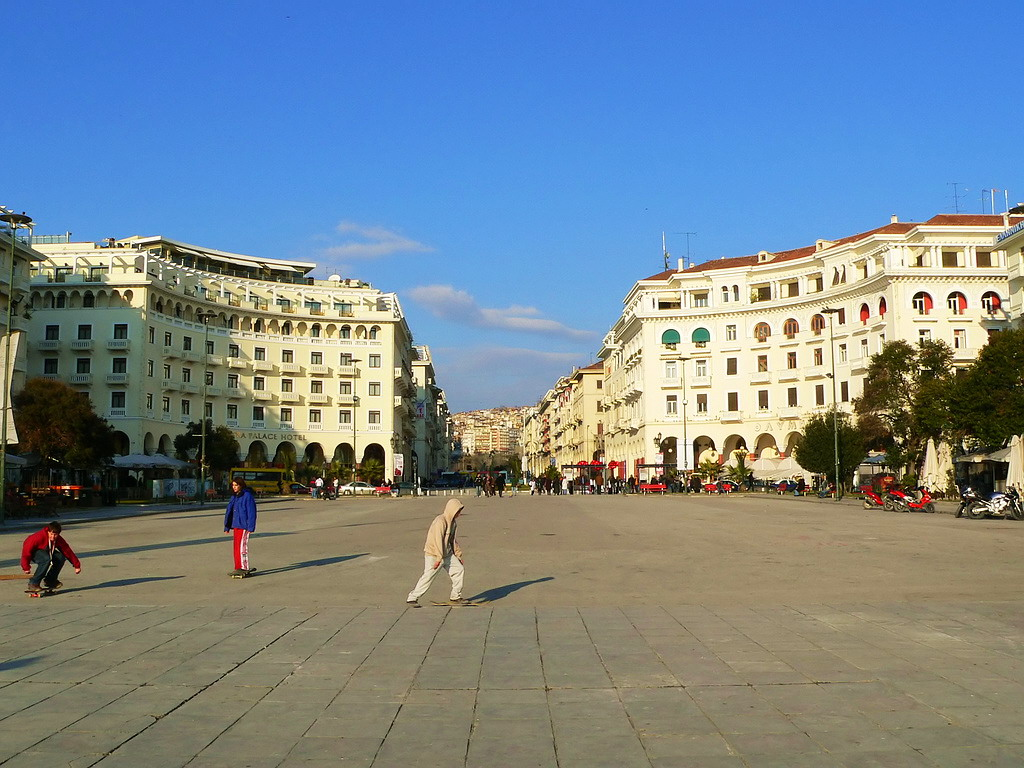

=== Compensation ===
After the destruction of the city, insurance companies sent their agents to survey the damage. There were rumours that Germans or French had caused the fire by arson, but these were disproved. The total amount of insurance contracts was about 3,000,000 golden pounds. The majority of insurance companies within the region were British. The insurance company, North British and Mercantile Insurance, had to compensate 3,000 insurance contracts. The Court deemed the fire was caused by accidental reasons. Under the pressure of Greek and foreign authorities along with the Court, all of the insurance policies were completely paid.

== Reconstruction ==
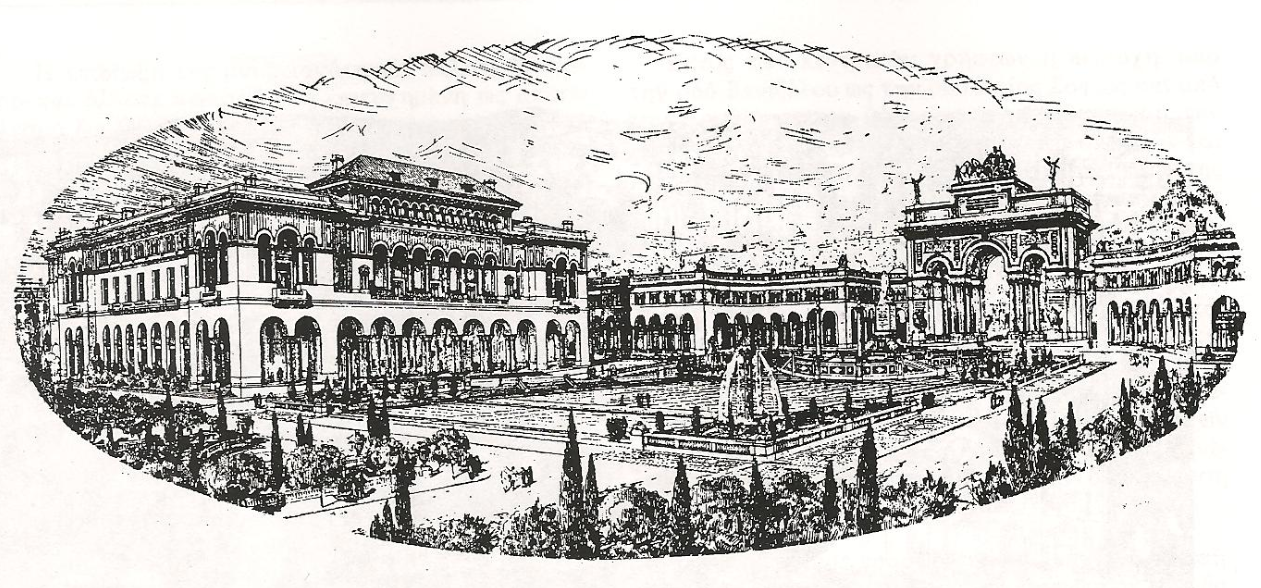
Hebrard's proposal for a Place Civique, 1918

Only a few days after the fire, the Venizelos government announced that it would not allow reconstruction of the city as it was. They intended to create a new city instead, according to an urban plan. The Minister of Transports Alexandros Papanastasiou was given the lead and founded the "International Committee for the New Plan of Thessaloniki". He appointed as chairman the French architect and archeologist Ernest Hébrard, who supervised development of the plan. Other members included the British landscape architect Thomas Hayton Mawson, the French engineer and architect Joseph Pleyber, the architects Aristotle Zachos and Konstantinos Kitsikis, the port planner Angelos Ginis and the city's mayor Konstantinos Angelakis. Delivered to the General Administration of Macedonia on 29 June 1918, the plan was to redevelop the city along European lines. It went through many changes, but established improved transportation routes, squares and other amenities to support a large population. The Swiss artist Émile Gilliéron fils, resident in Athens, travelled to the city to restore Byzantine artworks destroyed in the fire.

== See also ==
- Olive Kelso King
- Great fire of Smyrna
