= Somos =

Somos may refer to:

== Companies and organizations ==
- Somos (Argentina), a democratic socialist and feminist party
- Somos (Mexico), a centre-left political party
- Somos Group, an American media company, including:
  - Somos Distribution, an audiovisual content distribution company
  - SOMOS Films, a company that produces Spanish-language feature films
  - SomosTV, a pay TV company
- Somos, Inc., a company that manages registry databases for the telecommunications industry
- Somos SE, a Hungarian football club
- Somos (LGBTQ organization), a Brazilian organization operating from 1978 to 1983.

== Music ==
- Somos (band), an American rock band 2012–2019
- Somos (Christopher Von Uckermann album), 2010
- Somos (Eros Ramazzotti album), Spanish-language version of Noi, 2012
- "Somos", a song by Concha Buika and Chucho Valdés from El Último Trago, 2009

== People ==
- Efkleidis Somos (fl. early 20th century), Greek politician and lawyer
- Michael Somos (fl. late-20th/early-21st centuries), American mathematician
  - Somos sequence
  - Somos' quadratic recurrence constant

== Other uses ==
- Somos. a 2021 six-episode Mexican television series
- Somos (magazine), an Argentine magazine published by Editorial Atlántida
- Somos, a 1973–1976 Argentine underground magazine published by the Frente de Liberación Homosexual

== See also ==
- Somo (disambiguation)
