= Efkleidis =

Efkleidis may refer to:

== People ==
- Efkleidis Kourtidis
- Efkleidis Tsakalotos
- Efkleidis Somos

== Other ==
- Efkleidis metro station
