= Karin Baur =

Swiss mathematician

- Education: University of Basel (PhD)
- Awards: Royal Society Wolfson Fellowship (2018)
- Scientific career
- Fields: Mathematics
- Workplaces: University of Leeds; University of Graz; ETH Zurich; University of California, San Diego; University of Leicester
- Doctoral advisor: Hanspeter Kraft

Karin Baur is a Swiss mathematician who is working in the mathematical fields algebra, representation theory, cluster algebras, cluster categories, combinatorics, Lie algebras. Currently she is a professor at University of Leeds and she also a full professor at University of Graz. From 2007–2012 she has been an assistant professor (SNSF professor) at ETH Zurich. Moreover, she is one of the protagonists of the project Women of Mathematics throughout Europe.

== Recognition ==
In 2018 Baur was awarded a Royal Society Wolfson Fellowship for her work on Surface categories and mutation.

For her project Orbit Structures in Representation Spaces, she won an SNSF Professorship in 2007.

== Publications ==
- "List of arXiv preprints by Karin Baur".
