= Sergey Fomin =

Russian American mathematician

- Born: 16 February 1958 (age 68); Saint Petersburg, Russia
- Education: Saint Petersburg State University (Ph.D., M.Sc)
- Known for: Cluster algebras
- Awards: Leroy P. Steele Prize (2018)
- Scientific career
- Fields: Mathematics
- Workplaces: Michigan; MIT (1992–2000)
- Thesis: Rates of Convergence in Multidimensional Central Limit Theorem (1982)
- Doctoral advisor: Anatoly Vershik; Leonid Osipov

Sergey Vladimirovich Fomin (Сергей Владимирович Фомин) (born 16 February 1958 in Saint Petersburg, Russia) is a Russian American mathematician who has made important contributions in combinatorics and its relations with algebra, geometry, and representation theory. Together with Andrei Zelevinsky, he introduced cluster algebras.

== Biography ==
Fomin received his M.Sc. in 1979 and his Ph.D. in 1982 from St. Petersburg State University under the direction of Anatoly Vershik and Leonid Osipov. Previous to his appointment at the University of Michigan, he held positions at the Massachusetts Institute of Technology from 1992 to 2000, at the St. Petersburg Institute for Informatics and Automation of the Russian Academy of Sciences, and at the Saint Petersburg Electrotechnical University. Sergey Fomin studied at the 45th Physics-Mathematics School and later taught mathematics there.

== Research ==
Fomin's contributions include

- Discovery (with A. Zelevinsky) of cluster algebras.
- Work (jointly with A. Berenstein and A. Zelevinsky) on total positivity.
- Work (with A. Zelevinsky) on the Laurent phenomenon, including its applications to Somos sequences.

== Awards and honors ==
- Simons Fellow (2019)
- Steele Prize for Seminal Contribution to Research (2018).
- Invited lecture at the International Congress of Mathematicians (Hyderabad, 2010).
- Robert M. Thrall Collegiate Professor of Mathematics at the University of Michigan.
- Fellow (2012) of the American Mathematical Society.
- Elected to the American Academy of Arts and Sciences, 2023.

== Selected publications ==
- Fomin, S.; Zelevinsky, A. (2003). "Y-systems and generalized associahedra". Annals of Mathematics. 158 (3): 977–1018. arXiv:math/0505518. doi:10.4007/annals.2003.158.977. S2CID 5153512.
- Fomin, S.; Zelevinsky, A. (2003). "Cluster algebras II: Finite type classification". Inventiones Mathematicae. 154 (1): 63–121. arXiv:math/0208229. Bibcode:2003InMat.154...63F. doi:10.1007/s00222-003-0302-y. S2CID 14540263.
- Fomin, S.; Zelevinsky, A. (2002). "Cluster algebras I: Foundations". Journal of the AMS. 15: 497–529.
- Fomin, S.; Gelfand, S.; Postnikov, A. (1997). "Quantum Schubert Polynomials". Journal of the AMS. 10: 565–596.
