= Pantelemidis-TITAN =

The Pantelemidis family owned a company producing farm machinery (specializing in threshing machines) and buses, using the Titan brand name. It was established in Thessaloniki, Greece, in 1937. This company became best known, however, for the engineering inventions of Ioannis Pantelemidis; especially a novel chassis type he designed in 1955, on which he produced two vehicles, a 4-tonne truck and a city bus. The chassis featured a complex hydraulic mechanism and axle design which enabled the driver to adjust ground clearance (e.g. low, for easier loading, or elevated, for all-terrain drive).

Pantelemidis's struggle to get a licence to produce the vehicles are indicative of the Greek state's historically negative attitude to the local motor industry. A series of delays and refusals to conduct approval tests by the state (with the claim of insufficient legal framework concerning novel developments) lead Pantelemidis to "parade" his vehicles through Thessaloniki to gain public support. He exhibited his truck in the 1956 Thessaloniki International Fair, while in an article published in 1958 he claimed that successful tests were conducted in a Greek military facility. Eventually he got state permission to produce a maximum of two 4-tonne trucks. It seems that Pantelemidis abandoned all efforts at production in 1959, while the Pantelemidis factory continued to make bus bodies, supplying the Thessaloniki City Transport Authority (OASTH). The company was dissolved in 1988. The concept of Pantelemidis's "invention" seems familiar today, as several vehicles with similar mechanisms have appeared ever since, most probably through independent development.

== Sources ==
- L.S. Skartsis, "Greek Vehicle & Machine Manufacturers 1800 to present: A Pictorial History", Marathon (2012) ISBN 978-960-93-4452-4 (eBook)
- Neon Aftokiniton magazine, article in the January 31, 1956 issue
- Makedonia newspaper, articles in the May 16, 1957 and September 28, 1958 issues
- Eleftheria newspaper, article in the July 4, 1957 issue
- E. Roupa and E. Hekimoglou, I istoria tou aftokinitou stin Ellada (History of automobile in Greece), Kerkyra - Economia publishing, Athens (2009) ISBN 978-960-8386-95-2
- Apostolos Kourbelis archive
