= Andrei Zelevinsky =

Russian-American mathematician

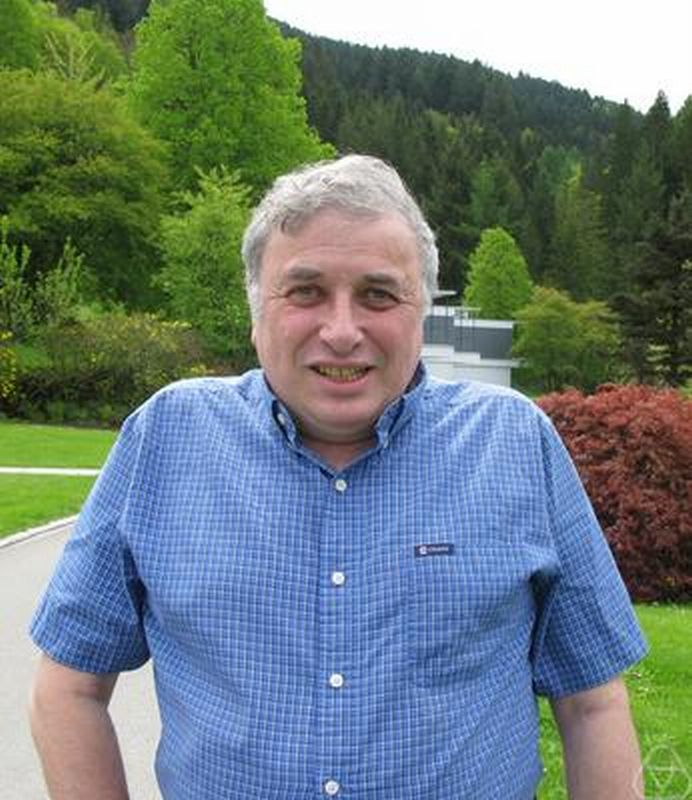
- Born: January 30, 1953; Moscow, Soviet Union
- Died: April 10, 2013 (aged 60); Boston, United States
- Education: Moscow State University
- Known for: Bernstein–Zelevinsky classification Cluster algebras
- Awards: Humboldt Prize (2004); Leroy P. Steele Prize (2018)
- Scientific career
- Fields: Mathematics
- Workplaces: Northeastern University
- Doctoral advisors: Israel Gelfand; Alexandre Kirillov

Andrei Vladlenovich Zelevinsky (Андрей Владленович Зелевинский; 30 January 1953 – 10 April 2013) was a Russian-American mathematician who made important contributions to algebra, combinatorics, and representation theory, among other areas.

== Biography ==
Zelevinsky graduated in 1969 from the Moscow Mathematical School No. 2. After winning a silver medal as a member of the USSR team at the International Mathematical Olympiad he was admitted without examination to the mathematics department of Moscow State University where he obtained his PhD in 1978 under the mentorship of Joseph Bernstein, Alexandre Kirillov and Israel Gelfand.

He worked in the mathematical laboratory of Vladimir Keilis-Borok at the Institute of Earth Science (1977–85), and at the Council for Cybernetics of the Soviet Academy of Sciences (1985–90). In the early 1980s, at a great personal risk, he taught at the Jewish People's University, an unofficial organization offering first-class mathematics education to talented students denied admission to Moscow State University's math department.

In 1990–91, Zelevinsky was a visiting professor at Cornell University, and from 1991 until his death was on faculty at Northeastern University, Boston. With his wife, Galina, he had a son and a daughter; he also had several grandchildren.

Zelevinsky is a relative of the physicists Vladimir Zelevinsky and Tanya Zelevinsky.

== Research ==
Zelevinsky's most notable achievement is the discovery (with Sergey Fomin) of cluster algebras. His other contributions include:

- Bernstein–Zelevinsky classification of representations of p-adic groups;
- Introduction (jointly with Israel Gelfand and Mikhail Kapranov) of A-systems of hypergeometric equations (also known as GKZ-systems) and development of the theory of hyperdeterminants;
- generalization of the Littlewood–Richardson rule and Robinson–Schensted correspondence using the combinatorics of "pictures";
- work (jointly with Arkady Berenstein and Sergey Fomin) on total positivity;
- work (with Sergey Fomin) on the Laurent phenomenon, including its applications to Somos sequences.

== Awards and recognition ==
- Invited lecture at the International Congress of Mathematicians (Berlin, 1998)
- Humboldt Research Award (2004)
- Fellow (2012) of the American Mathematical Society
- University Distinguished Professorship (2013) at Northeastern University
- Steele Prize for Seminal Contribution to Research (2018)
