= Kaftanzoglio Stadium =

Sports stadium in Greece

Coordinates: 40°37′32″N 22°58′01″E

- Καυτανζόγλειο Εθνικό Στάδιο
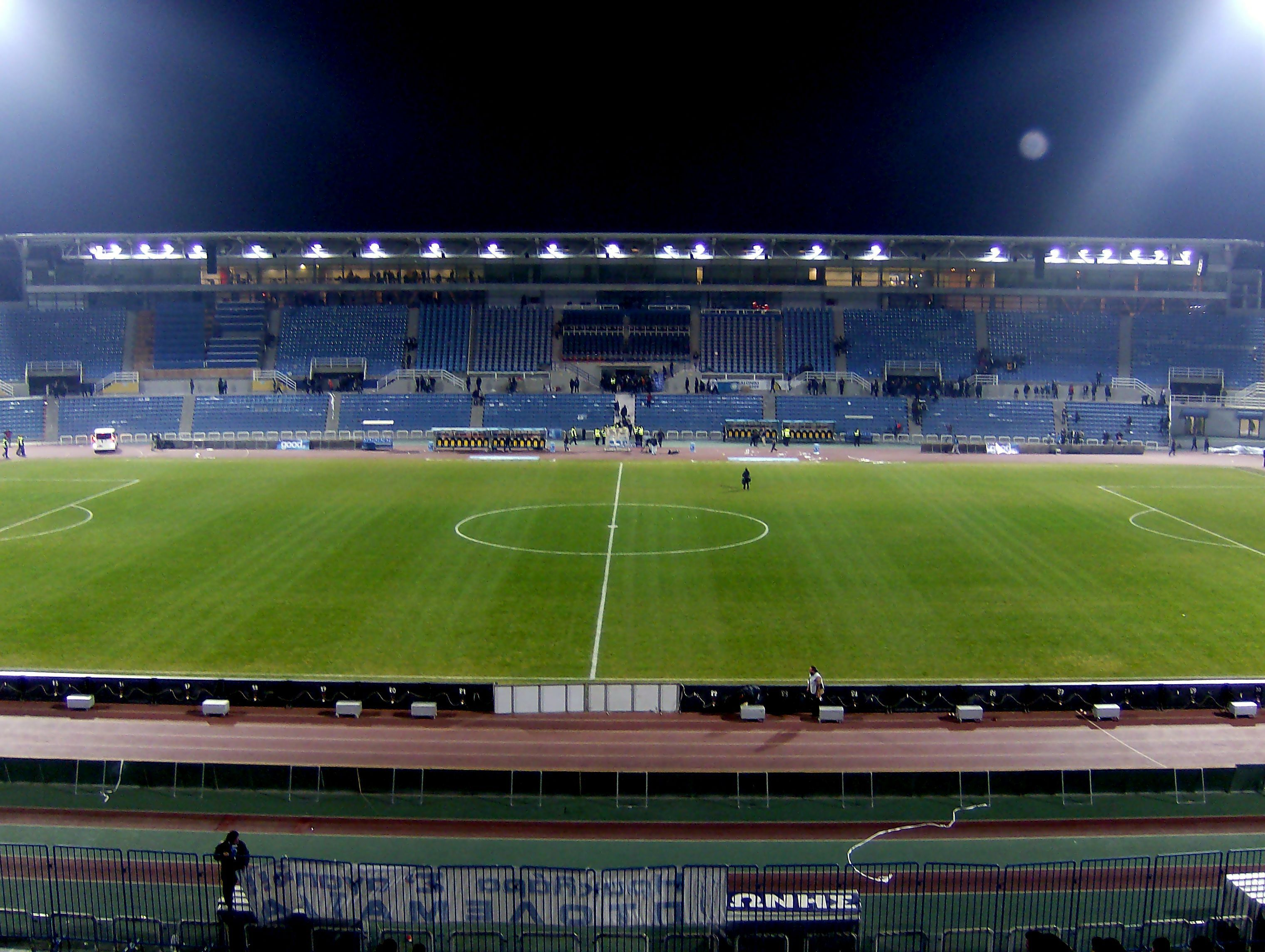
- The west stand of Kaftanzoglio
- Interactive map of Kaftanzoglio Stadium
- Full name: Kaftanzoglio National Stadium
- Location: Thessaloniki, Greece
- Owner: Hellenic Olympic Committee
- Operator: Thessaloniki Municipality
- Capacity: 27,560
- Surface: Hybrid grass
- Scoreboard: Yes
- Field size: 105 m × 68 m
- Public transit: O.A.S.TH. (17, 37): Stop "Kaftanzoglio"; Thessaloniki Metro: Metro Station "Panepistimio"

Construction
- Built: 1956–1960
- Opened: 27 October 1960
- Renovated: 2000, 2002–2004
- Cost: ₯ 36,000,000
- Architect: Georgios Pantzaris

Tenants
- Iraklis Thessaloniki (1960–2002, 2004–2019, 2021–2023, 2024–); Doxa Drama (2011–2012); Veria (2013)

Website
- kaftanzoglio.gr

Kaftanzoglio National Stadium (Greek: Καυτανζόγλειο Εθνικό Στάδιο) is a sports stadium in Thessaloniki, Greece. It currently has 27,560 seats, owing to conversion of terraces to seats in 2000 and a comprehensive renovation before reopening to host football matches for the 2004 Summer Olympics, which was centered in Athens. It is the home stadium of Iraklis Thessaloniki since 1960.

== History ==
The stadium was built with money donated by the Kaftanzoglou Foundation, in honour of Lysandros Kaftanzoglou, hence its name. At the time of its opening on 27 October 1960, the stadium was one of the highest quality stadiums in the Balkans. It was the largest stadium in Greece until 1982, but has since been surpassed in capacity by the Olympic Stadium in Athens.

On 15 October 1969, the attendance record was set with 47,458 fans present for a FIFA World Cup qualifying match, witnessing Greece defeat Switzerland by a 4–1 score. In 1973 it hosted the European Cup Winners Cup Final, which resulted in a 1–0 victory for Milan over Leeds United.

The complex has become increasingly dilapidated and derelict following the 2002–2004 renovations, with the stadium being temporarily closed after failed safety inspections concurrently with the Athens Olympic Sports Complex, which includes the Olympic Stadium.

== Athletics events ==
The stadium regularly hosts athletics events. It hosted the Greek national championships in 2009 and it has been used for both athletics at the Mediterranean Games and the European Cup in athletics. It was the host stadium for the 2009 IAAF World Athletics Final.

== Gallery ==
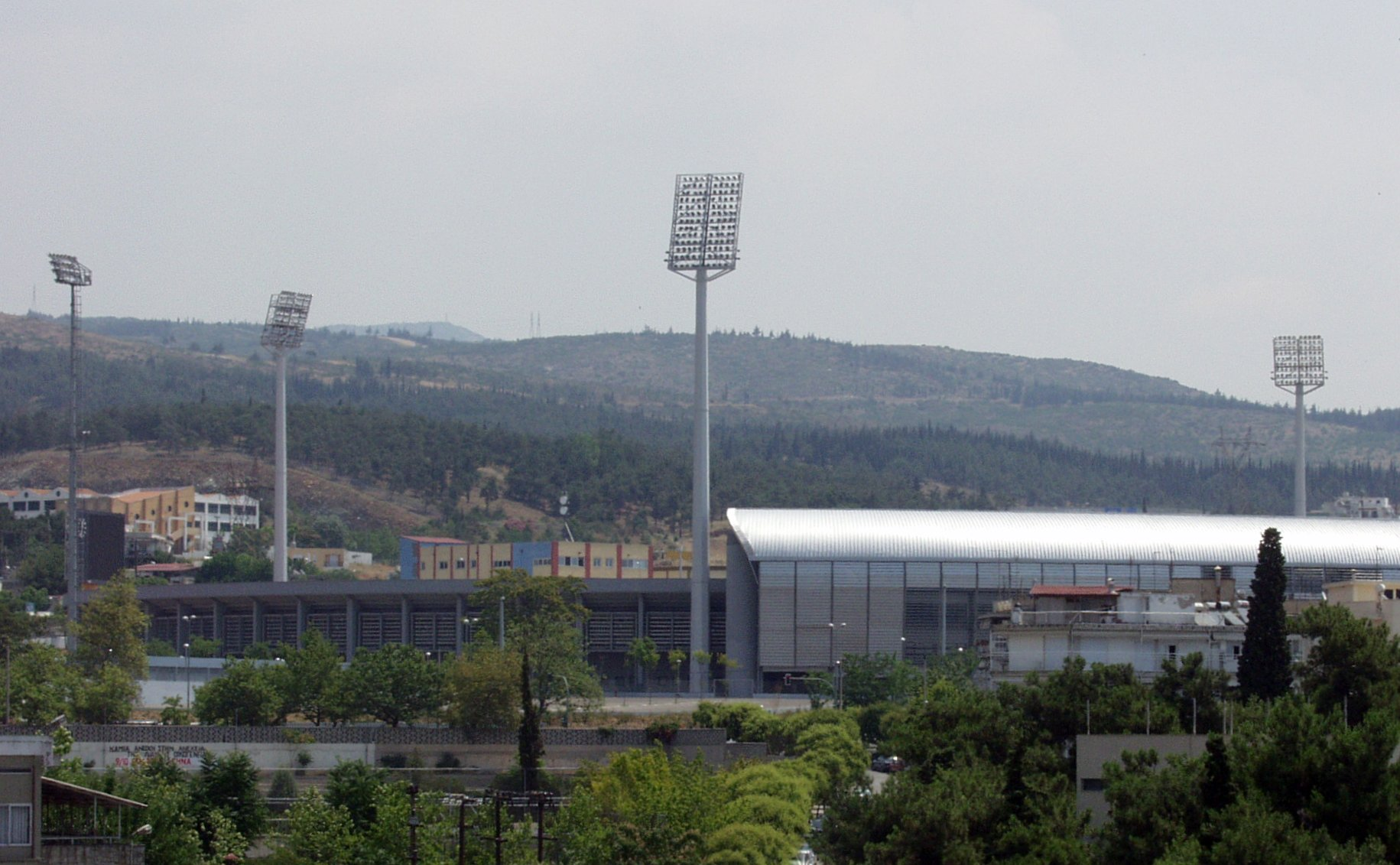
Exterior view

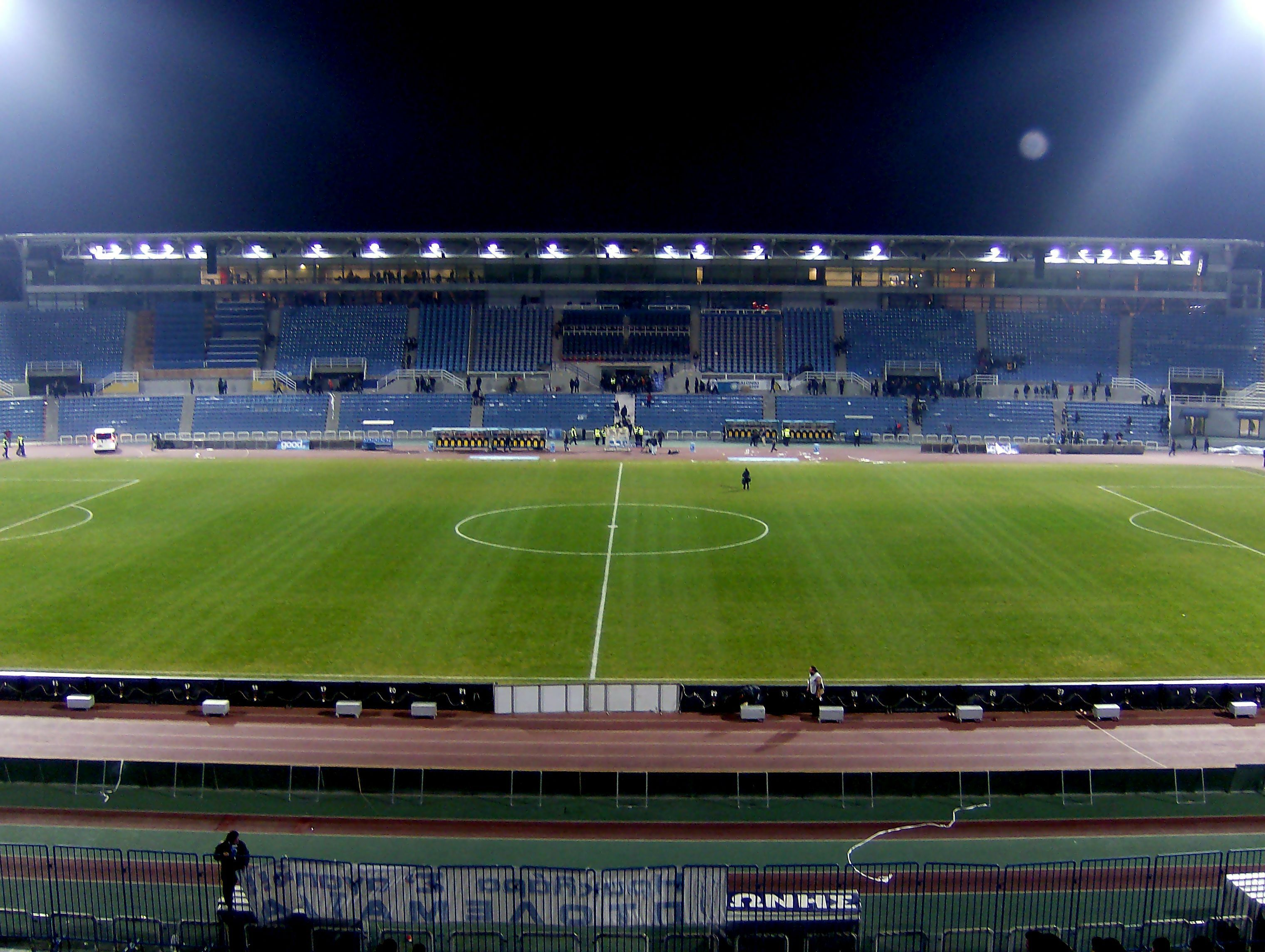
Interior view
