= Papafi metro station =

Metro station in Thessaloniki, Greece

Παπάφη Papafi
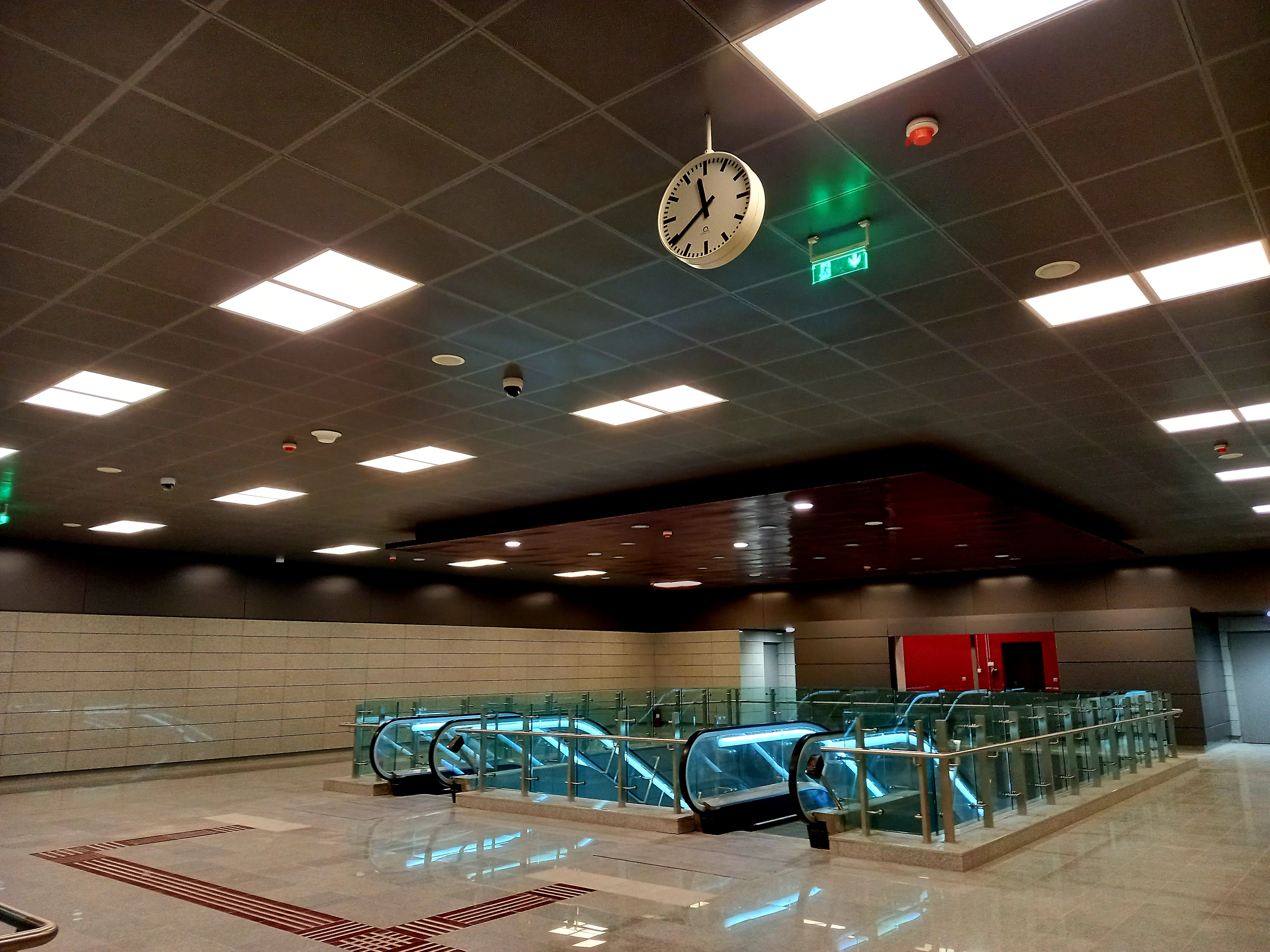

General information
- Location: Thessaloniki; Greece
- Coordinates: 40°37′11″N 22°57′45″E
- Owner: Elliniko Metro
- Operator: Thessaloniki Metro Automatic S.A. (THEMA)
- Transit authority: TheTA
- Line: Thessaloniki Metro Line 1 Thessaloniki Metro Line 2
- Platforms: 1 (island)
- Tracks: 2

Construction
- Structure type: Underground
- Accessible: Yes

History
- Opened: 30 November 2024

Services
Preceding station	Thessaloniki Metro	Following station
Panepistimio towards New Railway Station	Line 1	Efkleidis towards Nea Elvetia
Panepistimio towards New Railway Station	Line 2	Efkleidis towards Mikra
- Track layout
- Schematic only – not to scale.
Location

Papafi (Greek: Παπάφη,) is a metro station serving Thessaloniki Metro's Line 1 and Line 2. The station is named after the Ioannis Papafis, a Thessaloniki-born merchant, entrepreneur, and national benefactor of Greece. The station is built within the grounds of the Papafio Orphanage, a male-only orphanage financed by Papafis and operated by the Metropolis of Thessaloniki. Construction of this station was held back by legal conflicts between the Metropolis and Elliniko Metro (then Attiko Metro), the company overseeing its construction. The Metropolis challenged the company's right to the compulsory purchase of 907 square metres (9,760 sq ft) of the orphanage's garden grounds, resulting in a legal battle which reached Greece's Council of State. On 14 April 2011, it was announced that Attiko Metro and the Metropolis had reached a settlement, with the orphanage receiving a €4 million compensation. It entered service in 2024.

This station also appears in the 1988 Thessaloniki Metro proposal. In earlier iterations of the Thessaloniki Metro Development Plan, Papafi station is shown as a starting point for an extension of Line 1 to Nea Elvetia through Toumba, but this has been abandoned as of 2018.

== See also ==
- List of Thessaloniki Metro stations
- Media related to Papafi metro station at Wikimedia Commons
