= Bernstein–Zelevinsky classification =

In mathematics, the Bernstein–Zelevinsky classification, introduced by Bernstein and Zelevinsky (1977) and Zelevinsky (1980), classifies the irreducible complex smooth representations of a general linear group over a local field in terms of cuspidal representations.
