= Göbel's sequence =

Sequence of rational numbers

In mathematics, a Göbel sequence is a sequence of rational numbers defined by the recurrence relation

$$x_n = \frac{ x_0^2+x_1^2+\cdots+x_{n-1}^2}{n-1},\!\,$$

with starting value

$$x_0 = x_1 = 1.$$

Göbel's sequence starts with

1, 1, 2, 3, 5, 10, 28, 154, 3520, 1551880, ... (sequence A003504 in the OEIS)

The first non-integral value is x_{44}.

== History ==
This sequence was developed by the German mathematician Fritz Göbel in the 1970s. In 1975, the Dutch mathematician Hendrik Lenstra showed that the 44th term is not an integer.

== Generalization ==
Göbel's sequence can be generalized to kth powers by

$$x_n = \frac{1+x_0^k+x_1^k+\cdots+x_{n-1}^k}{n},$$

with starting value

$$x_0 = 1.$$

The least indices at which the k-Göbel sequences assume a non-integral value are

43, 89, 97, 214, 19, 239, 37, 79, 83, 239, ... (sequence A108394 in the OEIS)

Regardless of the value chosen for k, the initial 19 terms are always integers.

== See also ==
- Somos sequence
