= Pylaia depot =

Train depot in Thessaloniki, Greece

Pylaia Depot
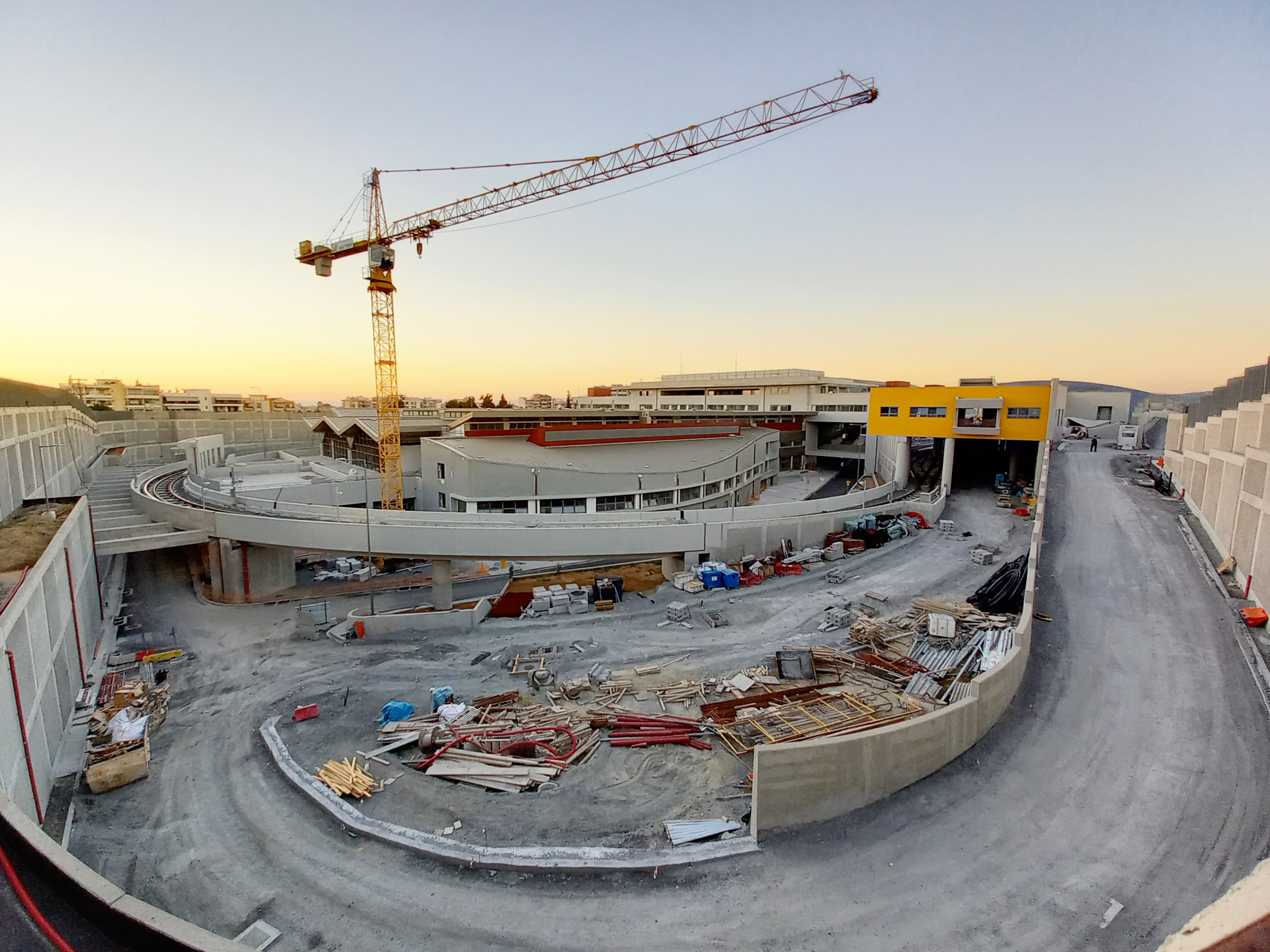
- The depot under construction in 2022

General information
- Location: Thessaloniki; Greece
- Coordinates: 40°34′57″N 22°58′12″E
- Owner: Thessaloniki Metro

History
- Opening: 2023
Location

The Pylaia depot (Greek: Αμαξοστάσιο Πυλαίας) is a rapid transit depot serving the Thessaloniki Metro. It features 50,000 m^{2} (540,000 sq ft) of space, and entered service in 2023, in preparation for tests runs before the official opening of the first phase of the metro on 30 November 2024.

== See also ==
- List of Thessaloniki Metro stations
- Media related to Pylaia depot at Wikimedia Commons
