= Fleming metro station =

Metro station in Thessaloniki, Greece

Φλέμινγκ Fleming

General information
- Location: Thessaloniki; Greece
- Coordinates: 40°36′33″N 22°57′26″E
- Owner: Elliniko Metro
- Operator: Thessaloniki Metro Automatic S.A. (THEMA)
- Transit authority: TheTA
- Line: Thessaloniki Metro Line 1 Thessaloniki Metro Line 2
- Platforms: 1 (island)
- Tracks: 2

Construction
- Structure type: Underground
- Accessible: Yes

History
- Opened: 30 November 2024

Services
Preceding station	Thessaloniki Metro	Following station
Efkleidis towards New Railway Station	Line 1	Analipsi towards Nea Elvetia
Efkleidis towards New Railway Station	Line 2	Analipsi towards Mikra
- Track layout
- Schematic only – not to scale.
Location

Fleming (Greek: Φλέμινγκ,) is a metro station serving Thessaloniki Metro's Line 1 and Line 2. The station is named after Fleming Street, under which it sits, itself named after the Scottish scientist Alexander Fleming. During construction, a Roman cemetery and a small settlement were found, and it is designated as a low-importance archaeological site by Elliniko Metro, the company overseeing its construction. It entered service in 2024.

This station also appears in the 1988 Thessaloniki Metro proposal.

== See also ==
- List of Thessaloniki Metro stations
- Media related to Fleming metro station at Wikimedia Commons
