= Somo =

Somo, SoMo, or SOMO may refer to:

== Places ==
In the United States

- Somo, Kentucky, unincorporated community
- Somo, Wisconsin, town

Elsewhere

- Somo, Mali, commune

== Rivers ==
- Somo River, river in Wisconsin, United States

== Music ==
- SoMo (born 1987), American recording artist
- SoMo (album), 2014 album by SoMo

== Acronyms ==
- State Organization for Marketing of Oil, Iraqi company
- Singly Occupied Molecular Orbital, in chemistry
- Centre for Research on Multinational Corporations (SOMO), Dutch non-profit organisation

== See also ==
- Somos (disambiguation)
- Somosomo, Fiji
