= Sintrivani metro station =

Train station in Thessaloniki, Greece

Σιντριβάνι Sintrivani
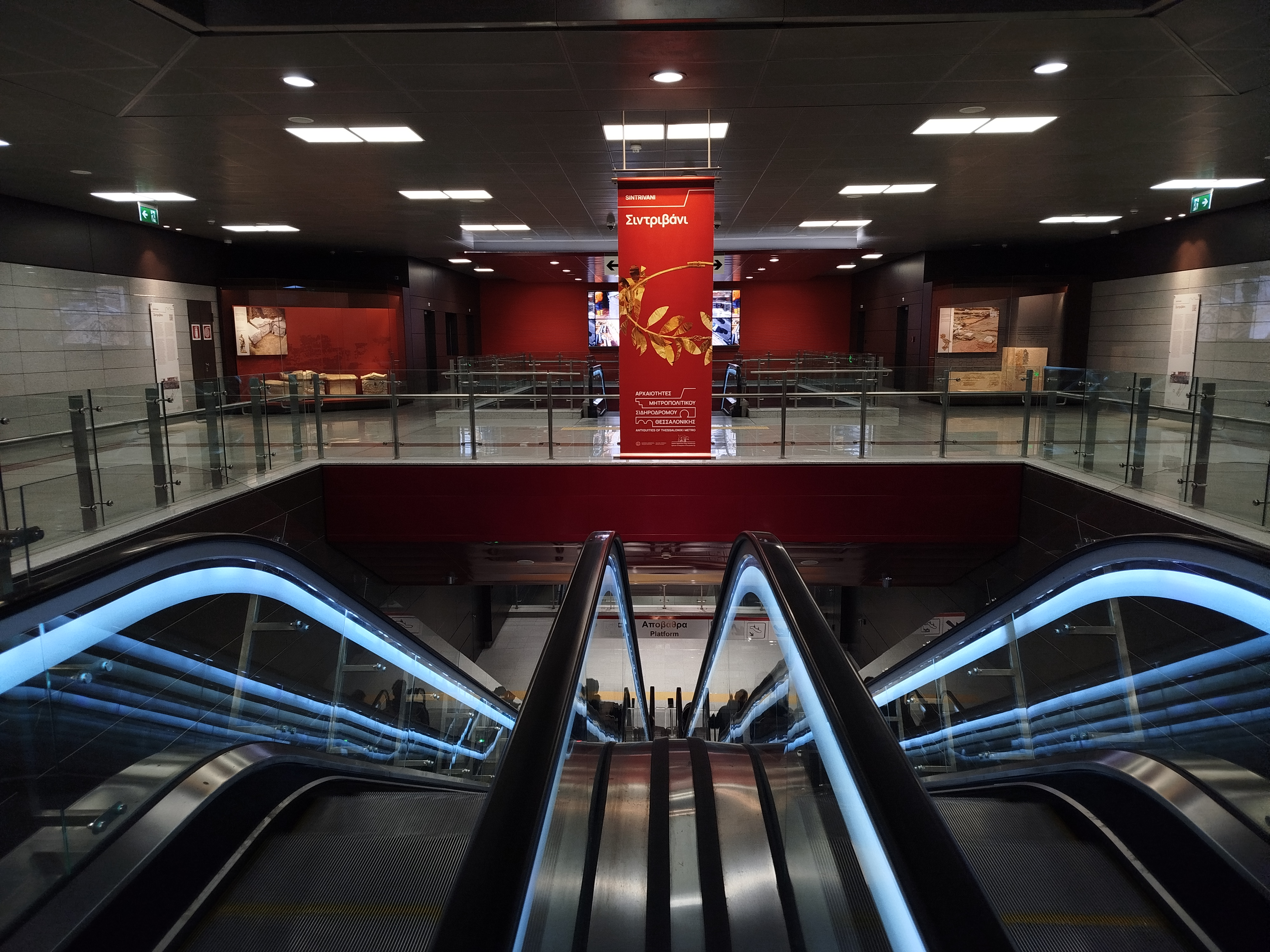

General information
- Location: Thessaloniki International Fair; Thessaloniki; Greece
- Coordinates: 40°37′50″N 22°57′15″E
- Owner: Elliniko Metro
- Operator: Thessaloniki Metro Automatic S.A. (THEMA)
- Transit authority: TheTA
- Line: Thessaloniki Metro Line 1 Thessaloniki Metro Line 2
- Platforms: 1 (island)
- Tracks: 2

Construction
- Structure type: Underground
- Accessible: Yes

History
- Opened: 30 November 2024

Services
| Preceding station | Thessaloniki Metro | Following station |
|---|---|---|
| Agias Sofias towards New Railway Station | Line 1 | Panepistimio towards Nea Elvetia |
| Agias Sofias towards New Railway Station | Line 2 | Panepistimio towards Mikra |
- Track layout
- Schematic only – not to scale.
Location

Sintrivani metro station (Greek: Σιντριβάνι,, lit. 'Fountain') is a metro station serving Thessaloniki Metro's Line 1 and Line 2. It entered service in 2024. The station is named after an Ottoman fountain, which marked the eastern entrance into the walled city before its expansion. In addition, the western side of the Aristotle University of Thessaloniki campus and the grounds of the Thessaloniki International Fair are immediately adjacent to it.

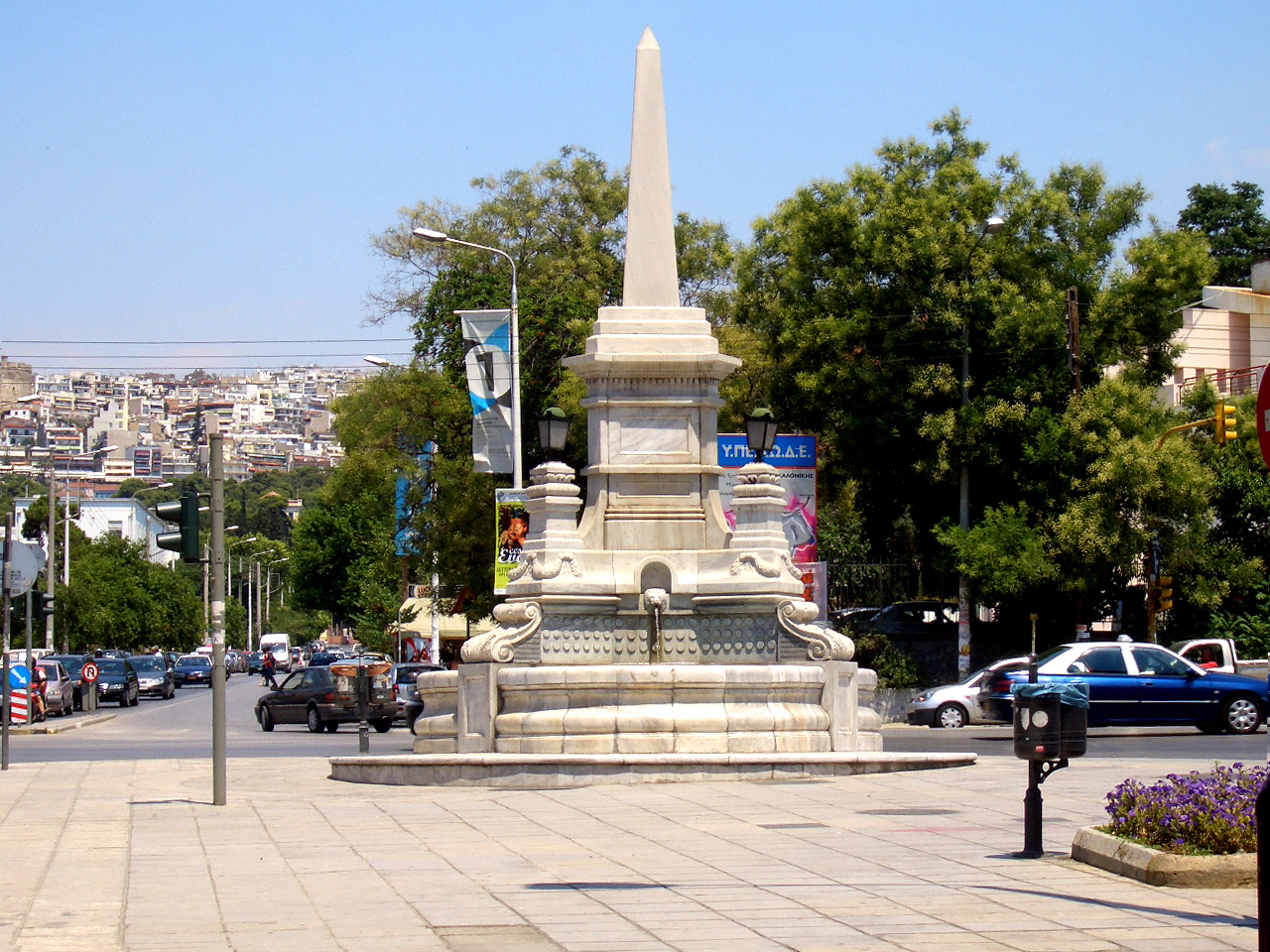
The fountain after which the station is named. It was gifted in 1889 by Sultan Abdul Hamid II to the people of Thessaloniki, which was then part of the Ottoman Empire. A Thessaloniki Metro construction information board is partly visible behind.

== History ==
The station appeared in the 1988 Thessaloniki Metro proposal. In previous iterations of the Thessaloniki Metro Development Plan, the station was shown with the alternative spelling Syntrivani (Greek: Συντριβάνι).

During construction, the station was known as Sintrivani/Ekthesi (Greek: Σιντριβάνι/Έκθεση, lit. 'Fountain/Exposition'), with the latter being in reference to the Thessaloniki International Fair.

== See also ==
- List of Thessaloniki Metro stations
- Media related to Sintrivani metro station at Wikimedia Commons
