= Somos' quadratic recurrence constant =

Mathematical constant

In mathematical analysis and number theory, Somos' quadratic recurrence constant or simply Somos' constant is a constant defined as an expression of infinitely many nested square roots. It arises when studying the asymptotic behaviour of a certain sequence and also in connection to the binary representations of real numbers between zero and one. The constant named after Michael Somos. It is defined by

$$\sigma = \sqrt {1 \sqrt {2 \sqrt{3 \sqrt{4\sqrt{5\cdots}}}}} \approx 1.661687949633594121295\dots$$

(sequence A112302 in the OEIS).

== Sums and products ==
Somos' constant can be alternatively defined via the following infinite product:

$$\sigma=\prod_{k=1}^\infty k^{1/2^k} =
1^{1/2}\;2^{1/4}\; 3^{1/8}\; 4^{1/16} \dots$$

This can be easily rewritten into the far more quickly converging product representation

$$\sigma = \prod_{k=1}^\infty \bigg(\frac{k+1}{k}\bigg)^{1/2^k}\! =
\left(\frac{2}{1}\right)^{1/2}
\left(\frac{3}{2}\right)^{1/4}
\left(\frac{4}{3}\right)^{1/8}
\left(\frac{5}{4}\right)^{1/16}\cdots = \prod_{k=1}^{\infty} \left(1+ \frac{1}{k}\right)^{1/2^k}.$$

Another product representation is given by:

$$\sigma = \prod_{n=1}^\infty\prod_{k=0}^n (k+1)^{(-1)^{k+n} \binom{n}{k}}$$

Expressions for $\ln\sigma$ (sequence A114124 in the OEIS) include:

$$\ln \sigma = \sum_{k=1}^{\infty} \frac{\ln k}{2^k} = \sum_{k=1}^{\infty} \frac{(-1)^{k+1}}{k} \text{Li}_k\left(\tfrac12\right)$$,

and

$$\ln \frac\sigma2 = \sum_{k=1}^{\infty} \frac{1}{2^k}\left(\ln\left(1+\frac{1}{k}\right)-\frac1k\right).$$

== Integrals ==
Integrals for $\ln\sigma$ are given by:

$$\ln \sigma = \int_0^1 \frac{1-x}{(x-2)\ln x} dx$$

$$\ln \sigma = \int_0^1 \int_0^1 \frac{-x}{(2-xy)\ln(xy)} dx dy$$

== Other formulas ==
The constant $\sigma$ arises when studying the asymptotic behaviour of the sequence

$$g_0 = 1$$
$$g_n = n g_{n-1}^2,  \qquad n \ge  1$$

with first few terms 1, 1, 2, 12, 576, 1658880, ... (sequence A052129 in the OEIS). This sequence can be shown to have asymptotic behaviour as follows:

$$g_n \sim {\sigma^{2^n}}\left(n+2-n^{-1}+4n^{-2}-21n^{-3}+138n^{-4}+O(n^{-5})\right)^{-1}$$

Guillera and Sondow give a representation in terms of the derivative of the Lerch transcendent $\Phi(z, s, q)$:

$$\ln\sigma = -\frac{1}{2} \frac{\partial\Phi}{\partial s}\!\left( 1/2, 0, 1 \right)$$

If one defines the Euler-constant function (which gives Euler's constant for $z=1$) as:

$$\gamma(z)=\sum_{n=1}^\infty z^{n-1}\left(\frac1n  - \ln\left(\frac{n+1}{n}\right)\right)$$

one has:

$$\gamma(\tfrac12)=2\ln\frac2 \sigma$$

== Universality ==
One may define a "continued binary expansion" for all real numbers in the set $(0,1]$, similarly to the decimal expansion or simple continued fraction expansion. This is done by considering the unique base-2 representation for a number $x\in(0,1]$ which does not contain an infinite tail of 0's (for example write one half as $0.01111..._2$ instead of $0.1_2$). Then define a sequence $(a_k)\sube \N$ which gives the difference in positions of the 1's in this base-2 representation. This expansion for $x$ is now given by:

$x=\langle a_1, a_2, a_3, ... \rangle$

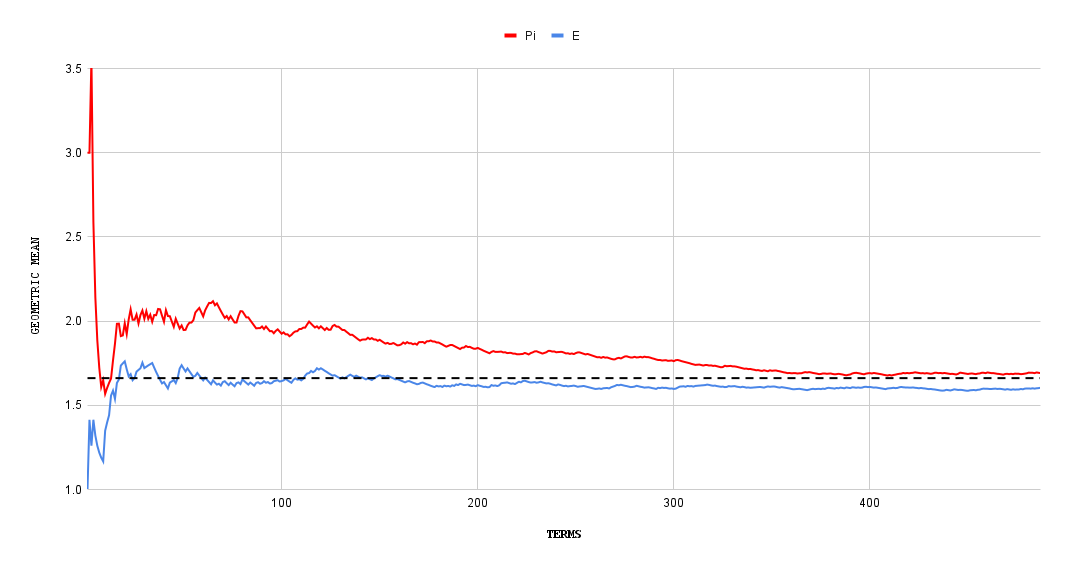
The geometric means of the terms of Pi and e appear to tend to Somos' constant.

For example the fractional part of Pi we have:

$\{\pi\} = 0.14159 \,26535 \, 89793... = 0.00100 \, 10000 \, 11111 ..._2$ (sequence A004601 in the OEIS)

The first 1 occurs on position 3 after the radix point. The next 1 appears three places after the first one, the third 1 appears five places after the second one, etc. By continuing in this manner, we obtain:

$\pi-3= \langle 3, 3, 5, 1, 1, 1, 1 ... \rangle$ (sequence A320298 in the OEIS)

This gives a bijective map $(0,1] \mapsto \N ^\N$, such that for every real number $x\in(0,1]$ we uniquely can give:

$x = \langle a_1, a_2, a_3, ... \rangle :\Leftrightarrow x= \sum _{k=1}^\infty 2^{-(a_1+...+a_k)}$

It can now be proven that for almost all numbers $x\in(0,1]$ the limit of the geometric mean of the terms $a_k$ converges to Somos' constant. That is, for almost all numbers in that interval we have:

$\sigma = \lim_{n\to\infty}\sqrt[n]{a_1a_2...a_n}$

Somos' constant is universal for the "continued binary expansion" of numbers $x\in(0,1]$ in the same sense that Khinchin's constant is universal for the simple continued fraction expansions of numbers $x\in\R$.

== Generalizations ==
The generalized Somos' constants may be given by:

$$\sigma_t=\prod_{k=1}^\infty k^{1/t^k} =
1^{1/t}\;2^{1/t^2}\; 3^{1/t^3}\; 4^{1/t^4}\dots$$

for $t>1$.

The following series holds:

$$\ln\sigma_t=\sum_{k=1}^\infty \frac{\ln k}{t^k}$$

We also have a connection to the Euler-constant function:

$$\gamma(\tfrac1t)=t\ln\left(\frac{t}{(t-1)\sigma_t^{t-1}}\right)$$

and the following limit, where $\gamma$ is Euler's constant:

$$\lim_{t\to 0^+} t\sigma_{t+1}^{t}=e^{-\gamma}$$

== See also ==
- Euler's constant
- Khinchin's constant
- Binary number
- Ergodic theory
- List of mathematical constants
