= Thessaloniki International Fair =

Annual international exhibition in Thessaloniki, Greece

Thessaloniki International Fair Διεθνής Έκθεση Θεσσαλονίκης
- TIF—HELEXPO logo
- Status: Active
- Genre: Fair, exhibition
- Date: First week of September
- Frequency: Annual
- Venue: HELEXPO Fair Grounds
- Locations: Thessaloniki, Macedonia
- Coordinates: 40.6278°N 22.9554°E
- Country: Greece
- Years active: 100
- Inaugurated: 1926
- Previous event: 7–15 September 2024
- Next event: 6–14 September 2025
- Participants: 1,500 (2017)
- Attendance: 263,000 (2017)
- Area: 180,000 m^{2} (1,900,000 sq ft)
- Organiser: HELEXPO
- Website: www.thessalonikifair.gr

The Thessaloniki International Fair (Greek: Διεθνής Έκθεση Θεσσαλονίκης, Diethnis Ekthesi Thessalonikis), abbreviated TIF (ΔΕΘ), is an annual international exhibition event held in Thessaloniki, Greece's second-largest city. It has been held in the first week of September since 1926, and its opening is traditionally marked by a series of programmatical statements by the Prime Minister of Greece. The 2020 fair was cancelled due to the COVID-19 pandemic, the first cancellation since WW2.

== Description ==
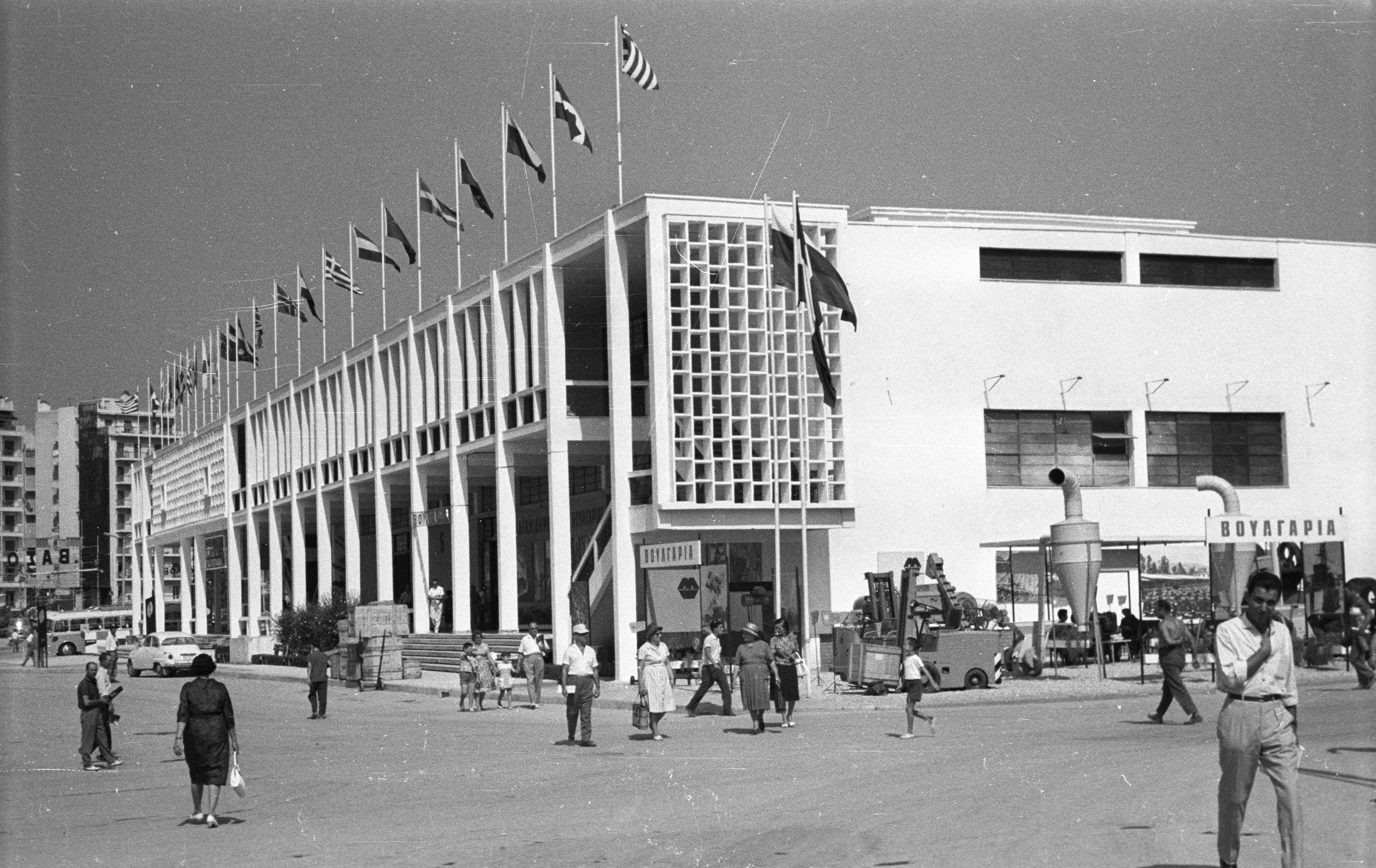
Snapshot from the 1964 event

The International Exhibition & Congress Centre is located in the YMCA Square of downtown Thessaloniki. Due to its location, it is accessible from the rest of the city. Sintrivani Station is located adjacent to the grounds.

The TIF HELEXPO Exhibition Centre covers a total area of 180,000 sq.m., of which 62,000 sq.m. are indoor exhibition areas, distributed into a complex of 17 pavilions that are functionally designed and interconnected to serve the needs of each event. The exhibition facilities are complemented by conference centres, parking areas, sports and recreational facilities, catering areas, citizen service centres, museums, banks and developmental agency offices. This way, Thessaloniki International Exhibition Centre functions as a hub providing services that successfully meet the requirements of exhibitions, conferences and cultural events.

Similar trade fairs of the city have occurred regularly since the Byzantine era, attracting traders from all over the Balkans.

== Events ==
It has been customary for the country's prime minister to set out his government's policies for each coming year in a speech at the annual Thessaloniki International Trade Fair, and for this reason the event has political significance in addition to its commercial importance.

== Honoured Country ==
With 1998 being the first year, the Fair has had a honoured country. Although this doesn't occur every year, with big gaps of honoured countries, specially from 2003 - 2007 and 2012 - 2015, this occurrence seems to have been stabilised in the past decade, with a country being selected for almost every event. Below is a table of the honoured countries in the Thessaloniki International Fair.

Year	Country	Comments			
Year	Country	Comments	1998	China	First honoured country in the history of the fair.
1999	None				
2000	United States				
2001	None				
2002	France				
2003	None	The organisers decided to have an honoured country every other year, something that didn't come to fruition.			
2004	None				
2005	None				
2006	None				
2007	None				
2008	Italy				
2009	India				
2010	Hungary				
2011	Serbia				
2012	None				
2013	None				
2014	None				
2015	None	It was decided that from next year the honoured country will be reinstated.			
2016	Russia				
2017	China	First country to be honoured twice.			
2018	United States				
2019	India				
2020	None	The fair was cancelled due to the COVID-19 pandemic.			
2021	Greece	Honorary selection to celebrate the country's 200 years of independence.			
2022	United Arab Emirates				
2023	Bulgaria				
2024	Germany				
2025	None	Although there were reports of an unnamed Asian country being the honoured country, the focus ended up being on the 100 years of the fair's idea.			
2026	Japan				

== Gallery ==
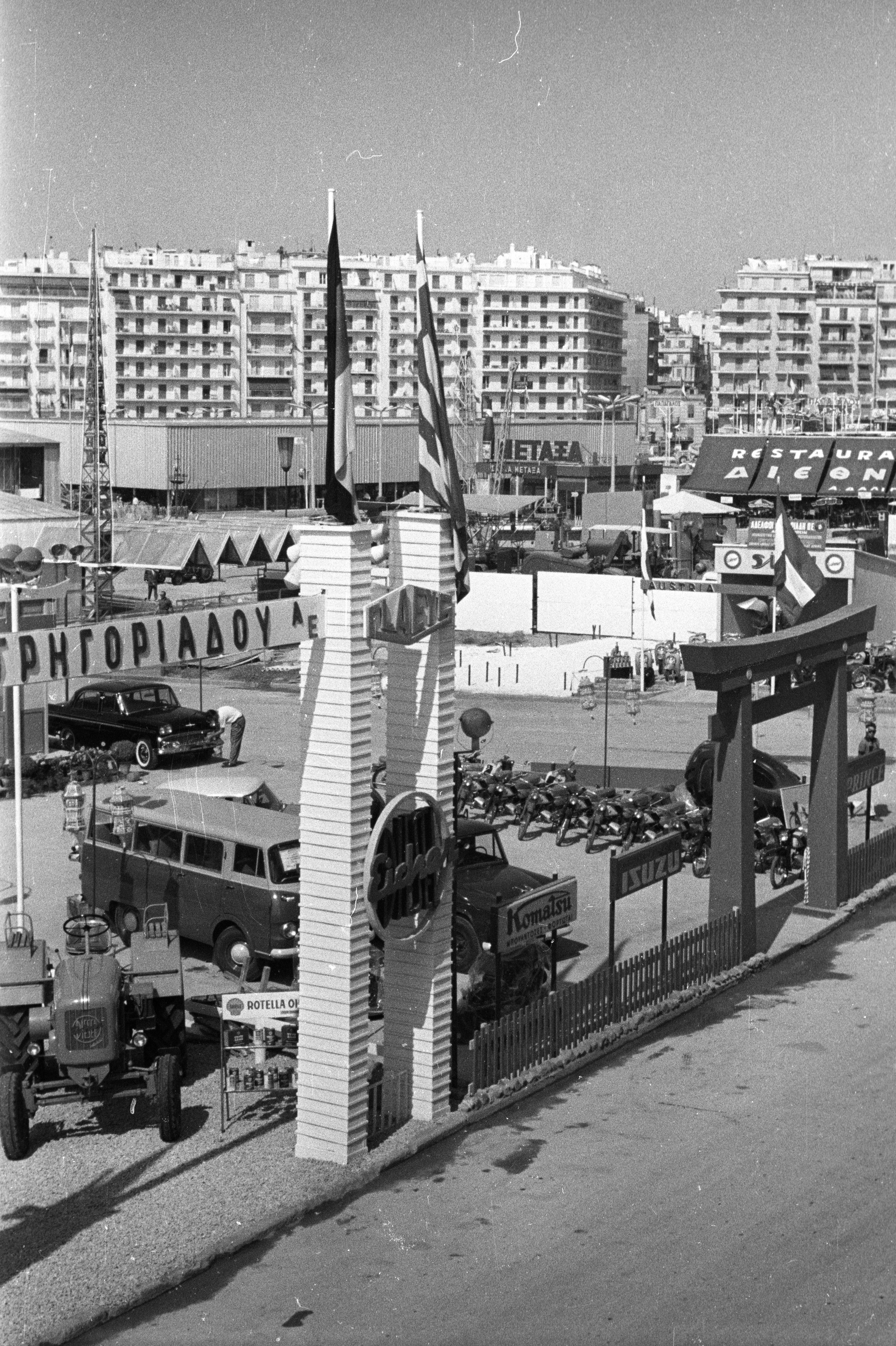
1964 photo

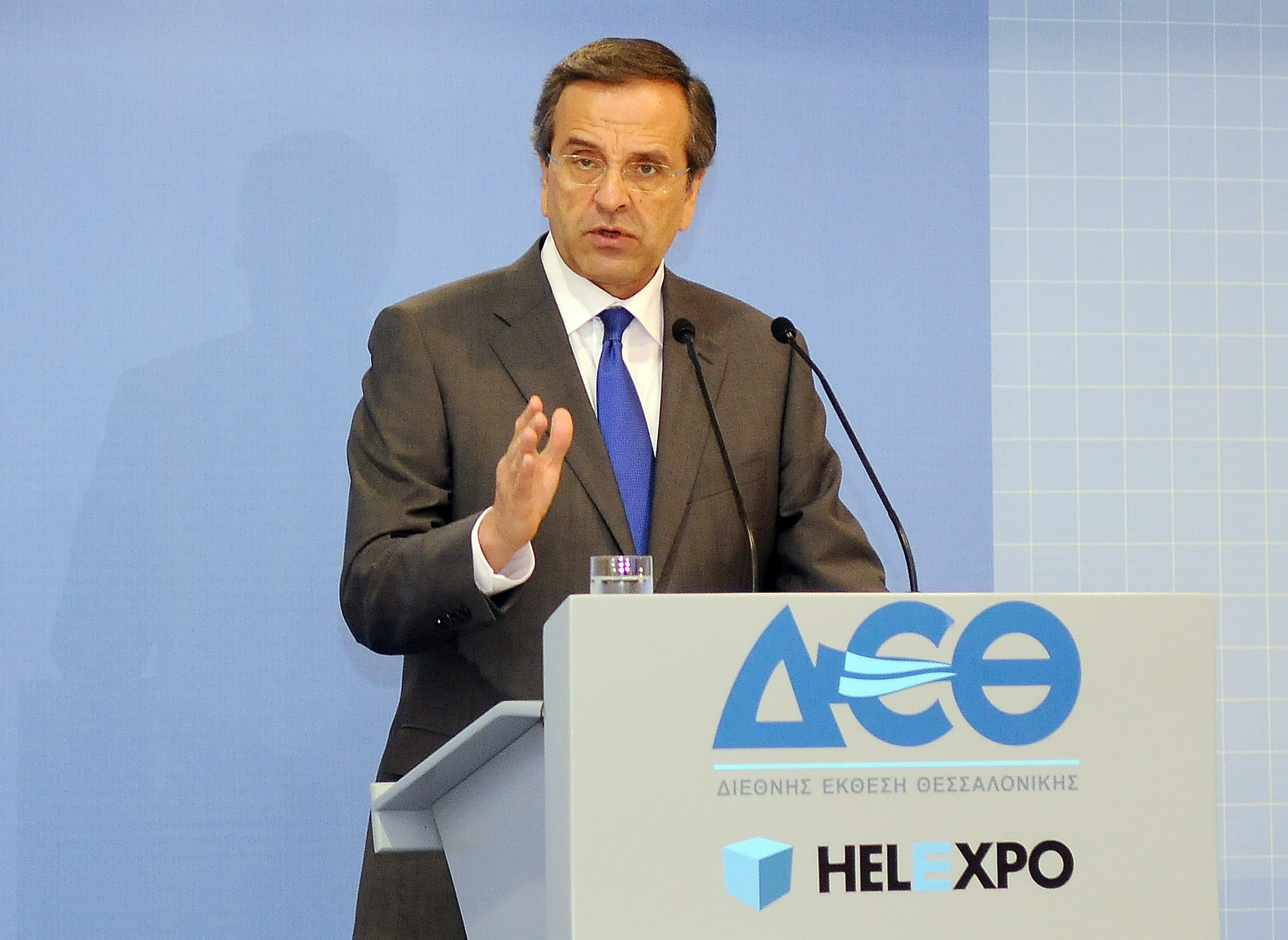
Antonis Samaras speech in 2012

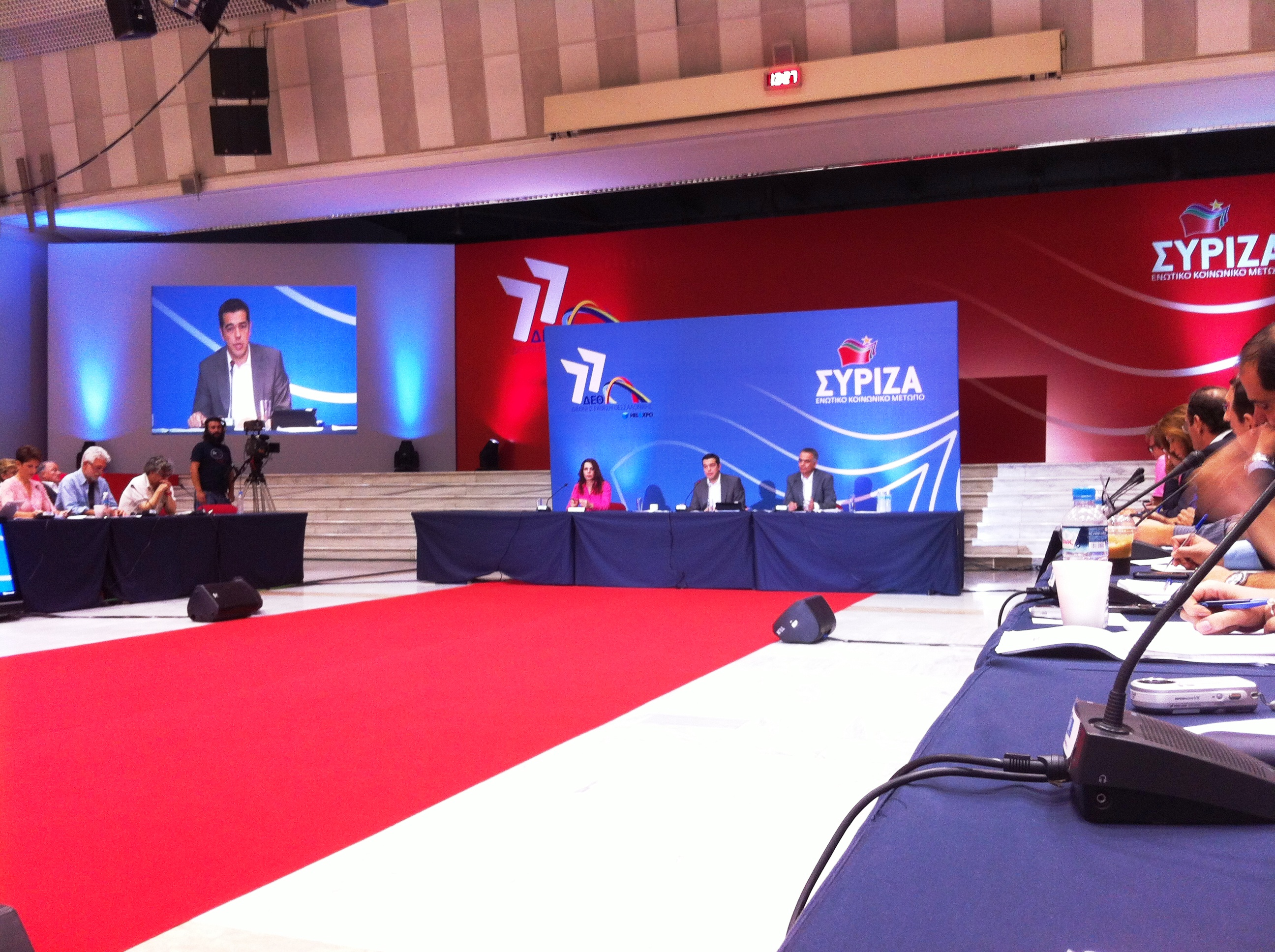
Syriza political press conference

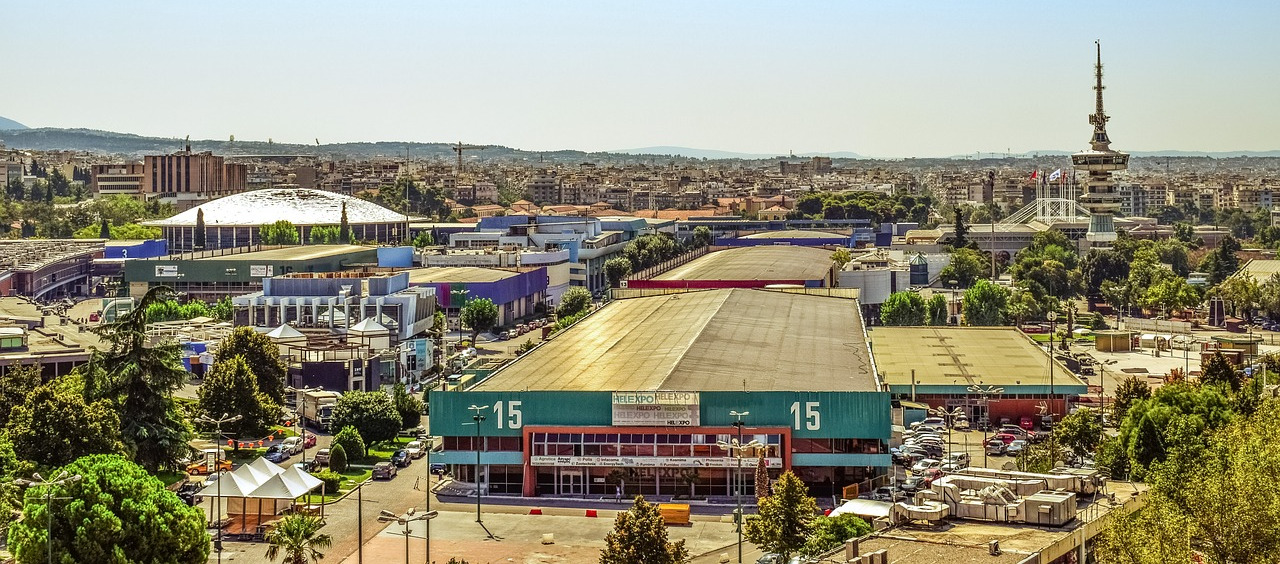
International Fair area

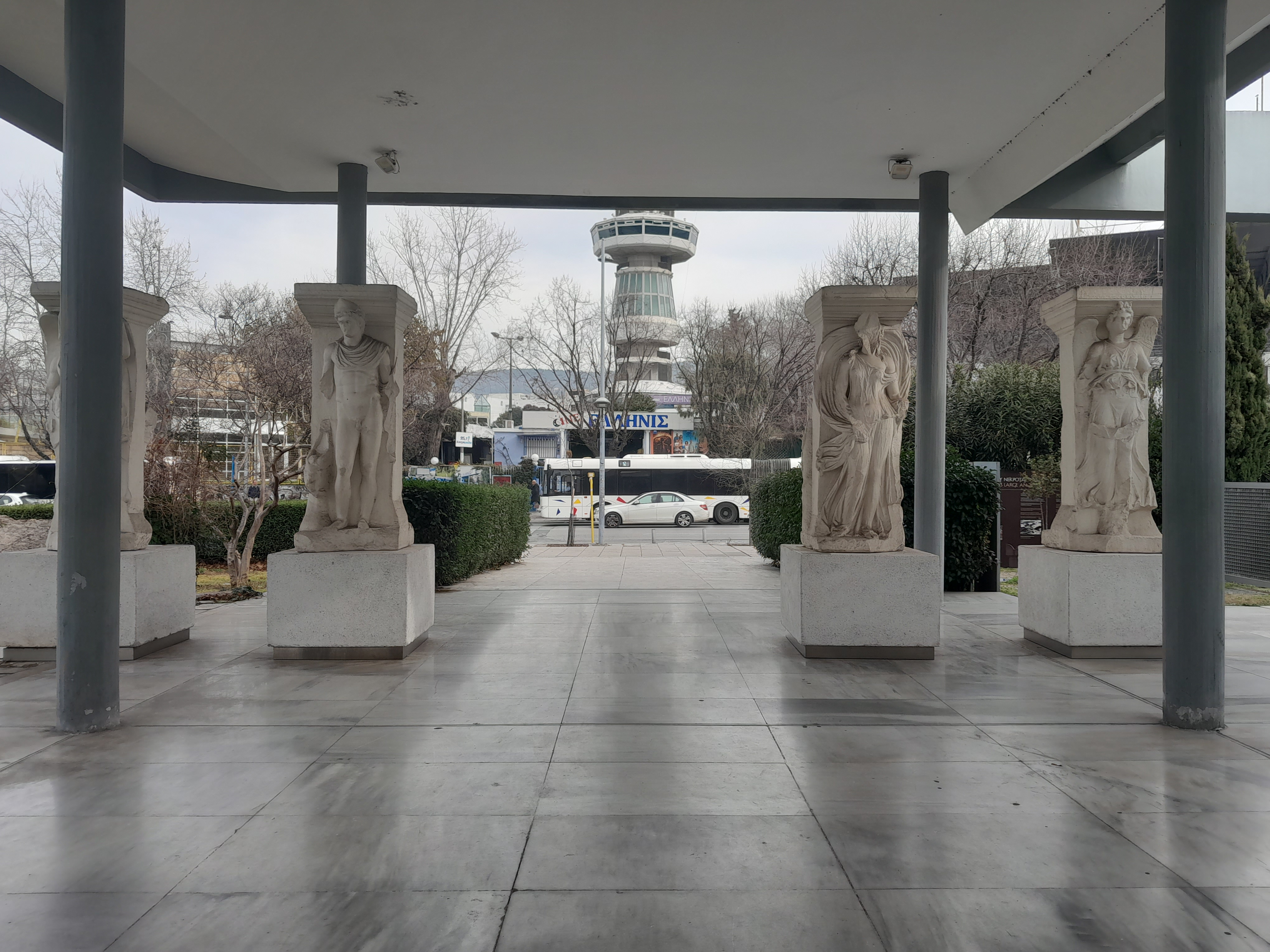
The TIF provided funds for the purchase of Las Incantadas replicas

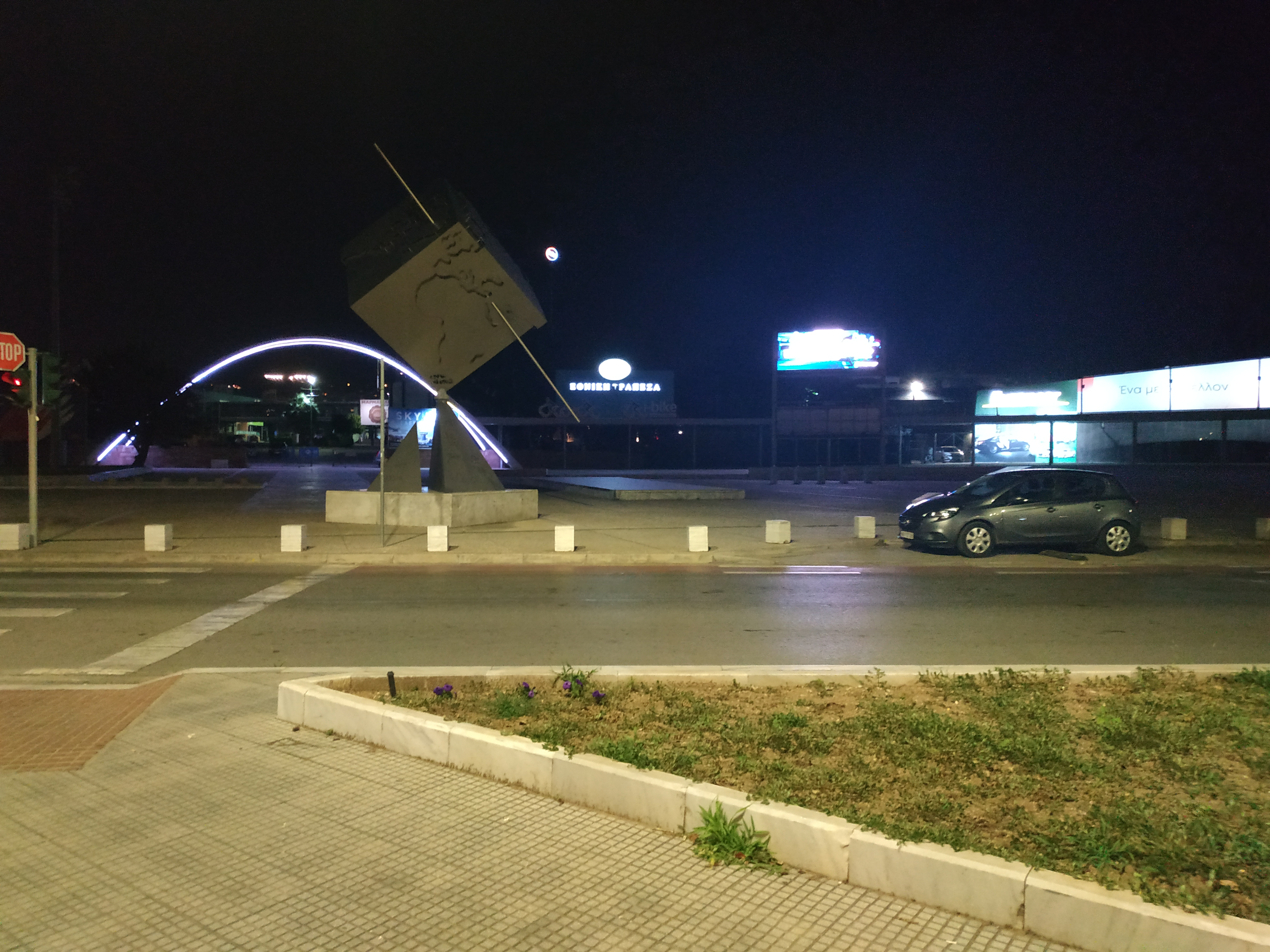
Front entrance

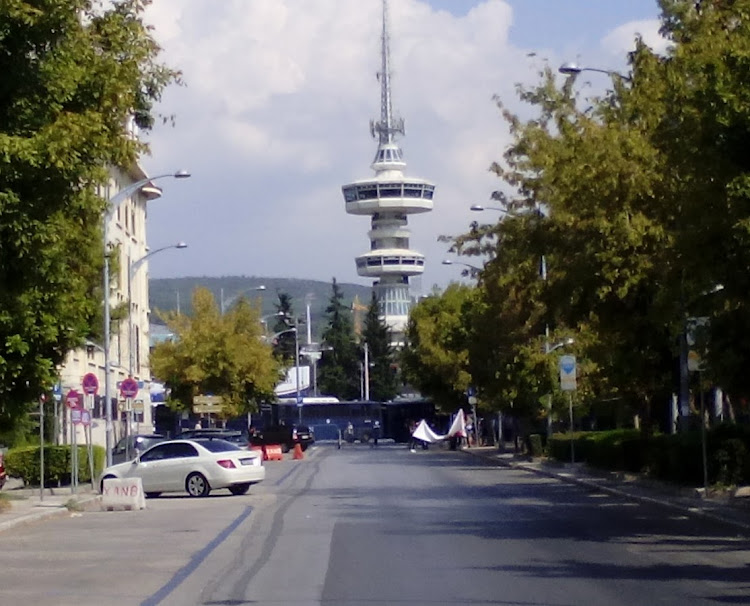
Thessaloniki International Fair
