= Efkleidis metro station =

Train station in Thessaloniki, Greece

Ευκλείδης Efkleidis
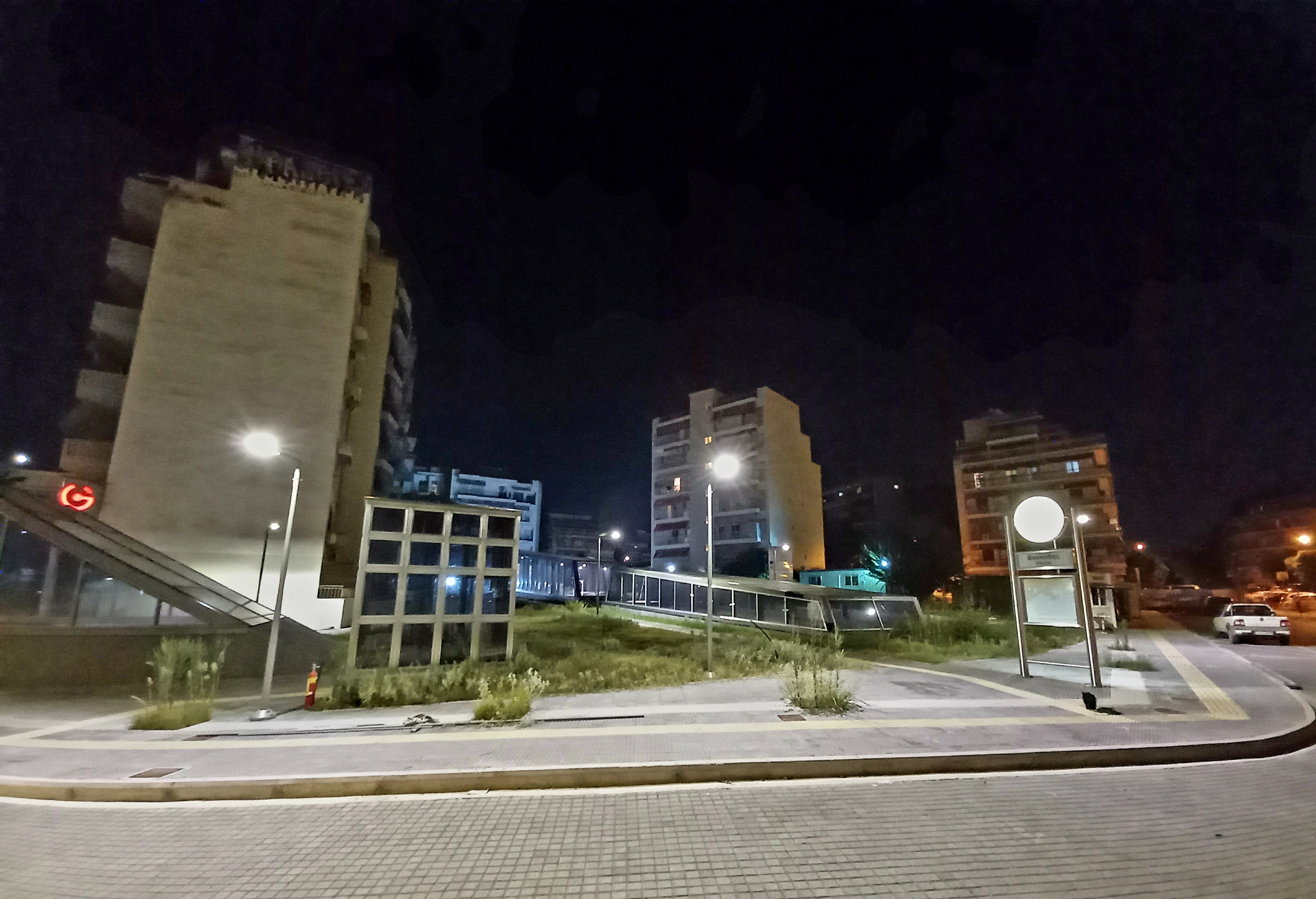

General information
- Location: Thessaloniki; Greece
- Coordinates: 40°36′58″N 22°57′37″E
- Owner: Elliniko Metro
- Operator: Thessaloniki Metro Automatic S.A. (THEMA)
- Transit authority: TheTA
- Line: Thessaloniki Metro Line 1 Thessaloniki Metro Line 2
- Platforms: 1 (island)
- Tracks: 2

Construction
- Structure type: Underground
- Accessible: Yes

History
- Opened: 30 November 2024

Services
Preceding station	Thessaloniki Metro	Following station
Papafi towards New Railway Station	Line 1	Fleming towards Nea Elvetia
Papafi towards New Railway Station	Line 2	Fleming towards Mikra
- Track layout
- Schematic only – not to scale.
Location

Efkleidis metro station (Greek: Ευκλείδης,) is a metro station serving Thessaloniki Metro's Line 1 and Line 2. The station is named after the ancient Greek mathematician Euclid and the neighbouring technical school of the same name, which currently houses the Thessaloniki department of ASPETE. It entered service in 2024.

Efklidis also appeared in the 1988 Thessaloniki Metro proposal, under the name Archaeological Museum. Until 1957, the stop "Paraskevopoulou" of the old Thessaloniki tram was located at the site.

== See also ==
- List of Thessaloniki Metro stations
- Media related to Efkleidis metro station at Wikimedia Commons
