= Panepistimio metro station (Thessaloniki) =

Metro station in Thessaloniki, Greece

Πανεπιστήμιο Panepistimio

General information
- Location: Aristotle University; Thessaloniki; Greece
- Coordinates: 40°37′34″N 22°57′36″E
- Owner: Elliniko Metro
- Operator: Thessaloniki Metro Automatic S.A. (THEMA)
- Transit authority: TheTA
- Line: Thessaloniki Metro Line 1 Thessaloniki Metro Line 2
- Platforms: 1 (island)
- Tracks: 2

Construction
- Structure type: Underground
- Parking: 2000 park and ride spaces
- Accessible: Yes

History
- Opened: 30 November 2024

Services
Preceding station	Thessaloniki Metro	Following station
Sintrivani towards New Railway Station	Line 1	Papafi towards Nea Elvetia
Sintrivani towards New Railway Station	Line 2	Papafi towards Mikra
- Track layout
- Schematic only – not to scale.
Location

Panepistimio (Greek: Πανεπιστήμιο,, lit. 'University') is a metro station serving Thessaloniki Metro's Line 1 and Line 2. The station is named after the two universities adjacent to it, the Aristotle University of Thessaloniki and the University of Macedonia. Construction of this station was delayed by major archaeological finds, and it is designated as a mid-importance archaeological site by Attiko Metro, the company overseeing its construction. It entered service in 2024.

Panepistimio station appears in the 1988 Thessaloniki Metro proposal, and construction of a 650 m (2,130 ft) section of the system began here in the same year before being abandoned due to lack of funding.

== See also ==
- List of Thessaloniki Metro stations
