= Michael Somos =

American mathematician

Michael Somos is an American mathematician, who was a visiting scholar in the Georgetown University Mathematics and Statistics department for four years and is a visiting scholar at The Catholic University of America. In the late eighties he proposed a conjecture about certain polynomial recurrences, now called Somos sequences, that surprisingly in some cases contain only integers. Somos' quadratic recurrence constant is also named after him.
