= Somos sequence =

In mathematics, a Somos sequence is a sequence of numbers defined by a certain recurrence relation, described below. They were discovered by mathematician Michael Somos. From the form of their defining recurrence (which involves division), one would expect the terms of the sequence to be fractions, but surprisingly, a few Somos sequences have the property that all of their members are integers.

== Recurrence equations ==
For an integer number $k$ larger than $1$, a Somos-$k$ sequence $\{a_n\}_{n \in \mathbb{Z}}$ is a solution of the equation
$$a_n a_{n-k} = \sum_{i=1}^{\lfloor k/2 \rfloor} \alpha_i a_{n-i} a_{n-k+i}$$
where $\alpha_1$, $\alpha_2$, ..., $\alpha_{\lfloor k/2 \rfloor}$ are fixed parameters. It can be rearranged into the form of an order $k$ recurrence relation
$$a_n = \frac{\sum_{i=1}^{\lfloor k/2 \rfloor} \alpha_i a_{n-i} a_{n-k+i}}{a_{n-k}}.$$
Hence a non-degenerate solution is determined by a choice of $k$ initial values $a_0$, $a_1$, ..., $a_{k - 1}$. The sequence yielded by setting $\alpha_1 = \alpha_2 = \dots = \alpha_{\lfloor k/2 \rfloor} = 1$ and $a_0 = a_1 = \dots = a_{k - 1} = 1$ is referred to as the Somos-$k$ sequence. The Somos-$k$ sequence is symmetric, i.e., $s_{-n} = s_{n + k - 1}$.

For $k = 2$ or $3$, the defining relations are very simple (there is no addition on the right-hand side).

In the first nontrivial case, $k = 4$, the relation is
$$a_n = \frac{\alpha a_{n-1} a_{n-3} + \beta a_{n-2}^2}{a_{n-4}}$$
where $\alpha$ and $\beta$ are constant parameters. In the case $k = 5$ the relation is
$$a_n = \frac{\alpha a_{n-1} a_{n-4} + \beta a_{n-2} a_{n-3}}{a_{n-5}}.$$

== Sequence values ==
The Somos-$2$ and Somos-$3$ sequences are the all-ones sequences (..., $1$, $1$, $1$, $1$, $1$, ...).

The values in the Somos-$4$ sequence are

1, 1, 1, 1, 2, 3, 7, 23, 59, 314, 1529, 8209, 83313, 620297, 7869898, ... (sequence A006720 in the OEIS).

The values in the Somos-$5$ sequence are

1, 1, 1, 1, 1, 2, 3, 5, 11, 37, 83, 274, 1217, 6161, 22833, 165713, ... (sequence A006721 in the OEIS).

The values in the Somos-$6$ sequence are

1, 1, 1, 1, 1, 1, 3, 5, 9, 23, 75, 421, 1103, 5047, 41783, 281527, ... (sequence A006722 in the OEIS).

The values in the Somos-$7$ sequence are

1, 1, 1, 1, 1, 1, 1, 3, 5, 9, 17, 41, 137, 769, 1925, 7203, 34081, ... (sequence A006723 in the OEIS).

The first 17 values in the Somos-$8$ sequence are

1, 1, 1, 1, 1, 1, 1, 1, 4, 7, 13, 25, 61, 187, 775, 5827, 14815 [the next value is fractional].

== Integrality and the Laurent phenomenon ==
The form of the recurrences describing the Somos sequences involves divisions, making it appear likely that the sequences defined by these recurrence will contain fractional values. Nevertheless, for $k \le 7$ the Somos sequences contain only integer values. Generally, for $k \le 7$, a Somos-$k$ sequence satisfies the so-called Laurent property. That is, as a function of the initial terms $a_0$, ..., $a_{k-1}$, every term $a_n$ is a multivariate Laurent polynomial with coefficients in $\mathbb{Z}[\alpha_1, \dots, \alpha_{\lfloor k/2 \rfloor}]$. Several mathematicians have studied the problem of proving and explaining this property of the Somos sequences; it is closely related to the combinatorics of cluster algebras.

For $k \ge 8$ the Somos-$k$ sequences eventually contain fractional values. For Somos-$8$ the first fractional value is the 18th term with value $420514/7$.

== Closed formula ==
Consider a Somos-$4$ relation
$$a_n a_{n-4} = \alpha a_{n-1} a_{n-3} + \beta a_{n-2}^2$$
with $\alpha \ne 0$. Then a complex-valued Somos-$4$ sequence corresponds to an arithmetic sequence of points $Q + n P$ on an elliptic curve $E$ (see Elliptic curve#Group law). The general term is given by the formula
$$a_n = A B^n \frac{\sigma(z_0 + n \kappa)}{\sigma(\kappa)^{n^2}}$$
where $\sigma(z) = \sigma(z; g_2, g_3)$ denotes the Weierstrass sigma function associated with the curve $E$ written in the canonical form
$$E: \quad y^2 = 4 x^3 - g_2 x - g_3.$$
The six parameters $g_2, g_3, A, B, z_0, \kappa \in \mathbb{C}$ are determined uniquely (up to a choice of sign) by the coefficients $\alpha, \beta$ and the initial terms $a_0, a_1, a_2, a_3$. The $(x, y)$ coordinates of the sequence $Q + n P$ are given by $(\wp(z_0 + n \kappa), \wp'(z_0 + n \kappa))$, where $\wp(z) = \wp(z; g_2, g_3)$ denotes the Weierstrass elliptic function. The coefficients $\alpha$ and $\beta$ are given as elliptic functions of $\kappa$ by
$$\alpha = \wp(\kappa)^2, \quad \beta =\wp'(\kappa)^2 (\wp(2 \kappa) - \wp(\kappa)).$$

== See also ==
- Göbel's sequence
