= Cluster algebra =

Class of commutative rings

Cluster algebras are a class of commutative rings introduced by Fomin and Zelevinsky (2002, 2003, 2007). A cluster algebra of rank n is an integral domain A, together with some subsets of size n called clusters whose union generates the algebra A and which satisfy various conditions.

== Definitions ==
Suppose that F is an integral domain, such as the field Q(x_{1},...,x_{n}) of rational functions in n variables over the rational numbers Q.

A cluster of rank n consists of a set of n elements {x, y, ...} of F, usually assumed to be an algebraically independent set of generators of a field extension F.

A seed consists of a cluster {x, y, ...} of F, together with an exchange matrix B with integer entries b_{x,y} indexed by pairs of elements x, y of the cluster. The matrix is sometimes assumed to be skew-symmetric, so that b_{x,y} = –b_{y,x} for all x and y. More generally the matrix might be skew-symmetrizable, meaning there are positive integers d_{x} associated with the elements of the cluster such that d_{x}b_{x,y} = –d_{y}b_{y,x} for all x and y. It is common to picture a seed as a quiver whose vertices are the generating set, by drawing b_{x,y} arrows from x to y if this number is positive. When b_{x,y} is skew symmetrizable the quiver has no loops or 2-cycles.

A mutation of a seed, depending on a choice of vertex y of the cluster, is a new seed given by a generalization of tilting as follows. Exchange the values of b_{x,y} and b_{y,x} for all x in the cluster. If b_{x,y} > 0 and b_{y,z} > 0 then replace b_{x,z} by b_{x,y}b_{y,z} + b_{x,z}. If b_{x,y} < 0 and b_{y,z} < 0 then replace b_{x,z} by -b_{x,y}b_{y,z} + b_{x,z}. If b_{x,y} b_{y,z} ≤ 0 then do not change b_{x,z}. Finally replace y by a new generator w, where

$$wy=\prod_{t: \, b_{t,y}>0}t^{b_{t,y}} + \prod_{t: \, b_{t,y}<0}t^{-b_{t,y}}$$

where the products run through the elements t in the cluster of the seed such that b_{t,y} is positive or negative respectively. The inverse of a mutation is also a mutation, i.e. if A is a mutation of B then B is a mutation of A.

A cluster algebra is constructed from an initial seed as follows. If we repeatedly mutate the seed in all possible ways, we get a finite or infinite graph of seeds, where two seeds are joined by an edge if one can be obtained by mutating the other. The underlying algebra of the cluster algebra is the algebra generated by all the clusters of all the seeds in this graph. The cluster algebra also comes with the extra structure of the seeds of this graph.

A cluster algebra is said to be of finite type if it has only a finite number of seeds. Fomin & Zelevinsky (2003) showed that the cluster algebras of finite type can be classified in terms of the Dynkin diagrams of finite-dimensional simple Lie algebras.

== Integrability ==
Some dynamical systems, like the pentagram map, can be interpreted in terms of cluster mutations. This can be used to prove integrability.

== Examples ==
=== Cluster algebras of rank 1 ===
If {x} is the cluster of a seed of rank 1, then the only mutation takes this to {2x^{−1}}. So a cluster algebra of rank 1 is just a ring k[x,x^{−1}] of Laurent polynomials, and it has just two clusters, {x} and {2x^{−1}}. In particular it is of finite type and is associated with the Dynkin diagram A_{1}.

=== Cluster algebras of rank 2 ===
Suppose that we start with the cluster {x_{1}, x_{2}} and take the exchange matrix with b_{12} = –b_{21} = 1. Then mutation gives a sequence of variables x_{1}, x_{2}, x_{3}, x_{4},... such that the clusters are given by adjacent pairs {x_{n}, x_{n+1}}. The variables are related by

$$\displaystyle x_{n-1}x_{n+1}=1+x_n,$$

so are given by the sequence

$$x_1, \ x_2, \ x_3 = \frac{1+x_2}{x_1}, \ x_4 = \frac{1+x_3}{x_2}=\frac{1+x_1+x_2}{x_1x_2},$$
$$x_5 = \frac{1+x_4}{x_3} = \frac{1+x_1}{x_2}, \ x_6 = \frac{1+x_5}{x_4} = x_1, \ x_7 = \frac{1+x_6}{x_5} = x_2, \ \ldots$$

which repeats with period 5. So this cluster algebra has exactly 5 clusters, and in particular is of finite type. It is associated with the Dynkin diagram A_{2}.

There are similar examples with b_{12} = 1, –b_{21} = 2 or 3, where the analogous sequence of cluster variables repeats with period 6 or 8. These are also of finite type, and are associated with the Dynkin diagrams B_{2} and G_{2}. However if |b_{12}b_{21}| ≥ 4 then the sequence of cluster variables is not periodic and the cluster algebra is of infinite type.

=== Cluster algebras of rank 3 ===
Suppose we start with the quiver x_{1} → x_{2} → x_{3}. Then the 14 clusters are:

$$\left\{ x_1,x_2,x_3 \right\},$$
$$\left\{\frac{1+x_2}{x_1},x_2,x_3 \right\},$$
$$\left\{x_1, \frac{x_1 + x_3}{x_2},x_3 \right\},$$
$$\left\{x_1,x_2,\frac{1+x_2}{x_3}\right\},$$
$$\left\{\frac{1+x_2}{x_1}, \frac{x_1 +(1+x_2)x_3}{x_1 x_2},x_3 \right\},$$
$$\left\{\frac{1+x_2}{x_1},x_2,\frac{1+x_2}{x_3} \right\},$$
$$\left\{\frac{x_1+(1+x_2)x_3}{x_1x_2},\frac{x_1 + x_3}{x_2},x_3 \right\},$$
$$\left\{x_1,\frac{x_1+x_3}{x_2},\frac{(1+x_2)x_1+x_3}{x_2x_3} \right\},$$
$$\left\{x_1,\frac{(1+x_2)x_1 + x_3}{x_2 x_3},\frac{1+x_2}{x_3} \right\},$$
$$\left\{\frac{1+x_2}{x_1},\frac{x_1+(1+x_2)x_3}{x_1 x_2},\frac{(1+x_2)x_1 +(1+x_2)x_3}{x_1 x_2x_3}\right\},$$
$$\left\{\frac{1+x_2}{x_1},\frac{(1+x_2)x_1 +(1+x_2)x_3}{x_1 x_2x_3},
\frac{1+x_2}{x_3} \right\},$$
$$\left\{\frac{x_1+(1+x_2)x_3}{x_1x_2},\frac{x_1+x_3}{x_2},\frac{(1+x_2)x_1+(1+x_2)x_3}{x_1 x_2 x_3} \right\},$$
$$\left\{\frac{(1+x_2)x_1 +(1+x_2)x_3}{x_1 x_2x_3},\frac{x_1+x_3}{x_2},\frac{(1+x_2)x_1+x_3}{x_2 x_3} \right\},$$
$$\left\{\frac{(1+x_2)x_1+(1+x_2)x_3}{x_1 x_2 x_3},\frac{(1+x_2)x_1+x_3}{x_2 x_3},\frac{1+x_2}{x_3} \right\}.$$

There are 6 cluster variables other than the 3 initial ones x_{1}, x_{2}, x_{3} given by

$$\frac{1+x_2}{x_1},\frac{x_1 + x_3}{x_2},\frac{1+x_2}{x_3}, \frac{x_1+(1+x_2)x_3}{x_1x_2}, \frac{(1+x_2)x_1+x_3}{x_2 x_3}, \frac{(1+x_2)x_1 +(1+x_2)x_3}{x_1 x_2x_3}$$.

They correspond to the 6 positive roots of the Dynkin diagram A_{3}: more precisely the denominators are monomials in x_{1}, x_{2}, x_{3}, corresponding to the expression of positive roots as the sum of simple roots. The 3+6 cluster variables generate a cluster algebra of finite type, associated with the Dynkin diagram A_{3}. The 14 clusters are the vertices of the cluster graph, which is an associahedron.

=== Grassmannians ===
Simple examples are given by the algebras of homogeneous functions on the Grassmannians. The Plücker coordinates provide some of the distinguished elements.

Mutation between two triangulations of the heptagon

For the Grassmannian of planes in $\mathbb{C}^n$, the situation is even more simple. In that case, the Plücker coordinates provide all the distinguished elements and the clusters can be completely described using triangulations of a regular polygon with n vertices. More precisely, clusters are in one-to-one correspondence with triangulations and the distinguished elements are in one-to-one correspondence with diagonals (line segments joining two vertices of the polygon). One can distinguish between diagonals in the boundary, which belong to every cluster, and diagonals in the interior. This corresponds to a general distinction between coefficient variables and cluster variables.

=== Cluster algebras arising from surfaces ===
Suppose S is a compact connected oriented Riemann surface and M is a non-empty finite set of points in S that contains at least one point from each boundary component of S (the boundary of S is not assumed to be either empty or non-empty). The pair (S, M) is often referred to as a bordered surface with marked points. It has been shown by Fomin-Shapiro-Thurston that if S is not a closed surface, or if M has more than one point, then the (tagged) arcs on (S, M) parameterize the set of cluster variables of certain cluster algebra A(S, M), which depends only on (S, M) and the choice of some coefficient system, in such a way that the set of (tagged) triangulations of (S, M) is in one-to-one correspondence with the set of clusters of A(S, M), two (tagged) triangulations being related by a flip if and only if the clusters they correspond to are related by cluster mutation.

=== Double Bruhat Cells ===
For $G$ a reductive group such as $GL_n$ with Borel subgroups $B_\pm$ then on $G^{u,v} = B u B \cap B_- v B_-$ (where $u$ and $v$ are in the Weyl group) there are cluster coordinate charts depending on reduced word decompositions of $u$ and $v$. These are called factorization parameters and their structure is encoded in a wiring diagram. With only $B$ or only $B_-$, this is Bruhat decomposition.

== See also ==
=== Bibliography ===
- Berenstein, Arkady; Fomin, Sergey; Zelevinsky, Andrei (2005), "Cluster algebras. III. Upper bounds and double Bruhat cells", Duke Mathematical Journal, 126 (1): 1–52, arXiv:math/0305434, doi:10.1215/S0012-7094-04-12611-9, MR 2110627, S2CID 7733033
- Fomin, Sergey; Shapiro, Michael; Thurston, Dylan (2008), "Cluster algebras and triangulated surfaces, part I: Cluster complexes.", Acta Mathematica, 201: 83–146, arXiv:math/0608367, doi:10.1007/s11511-008-0030-7, S2CID 14327145
- Fomin, Sergey; Zelevinsky, Andrei (2002), "Cluster algebras. I. Foundations", Journal of the American Mathematical Society, 15 (2): 497–529, arXiv:math/0104151, doi:10.1090/S0894-0347-01-00385-X, MR 1887642, S2CID 13629643
- Fomin, Sergey; Zelevinsky, Andrei (2003), "Cluster algebras. II. Finite type classification", Inventiones Mathematicae, 154 (1): 63–121, arXiv:math/0208229, Bibcode:2003InMat.154...63F, doi:10.1007/s00222-003-0302-y, MR 2004457, S2CID 14540263
- Fomin, Sergey; Zelevinsky, Andrei (2007), "Cluster algebras. IV. Coefficients", Compositio Mathematica, 143 (1): 112–164, arXiv:math/0602259, doi:10.1112/S0010437X06002521, MR 2295199, S2CID 15744006
- Fomin, Sergey; Reading, Nathan (2007), "Root systems and generalized associahedra", in Miller, Ezra; Reiner, Victor; Sturmfels, Bernd (eds.), Geometric combinatorics, IAS/Park City Math. Ser., vol. 13, Providence, R.I.: Amer. Math. Soc., arXiv:math/0505518, Bibcode:2005math......5518F, ISBN 978-0-8218-3736-8, MR 2383126
- Gekhtman, Michael; Izosimov, Anton (2025). "Integrable Systems and Cluster Algebras". Encyclopedia of Mathematical Physics (2nd ed.): 294–308. doi:10.1016/B978-0-323-95703-8.00029-X. ISBN 978-0-323-95706-9.
- Glick, Max (2011). "The pentagram map and Y-patterns". Advances in Mathematics. 227 (2): 1019–1045. arXiv:1005.0598. doi:10.1016/j.aim.2011.02.018. ISSN 0001-8708.
- Marsh, Bethany R. (2013), Lecture notes on cluster algebras., Zurich Lectures in Advanced Mathematics, Zürich: European Mathematical Society (EMS), doi:10.4171/130, ISBN 978-3-03719-130-9, MR 3155783
- Reiten, Idun (2010), Tilting theory and cluster algebras, Trieste Proceedings of Workshop, arXiv:1012.6014, Bibcode:2010arXiv1012.6014R
- Zelevinsky, Andrei (2007), "What Is . . . a Cluster Algebra?" (PDF), AMS Notices, 54 (11): 1494–1495.

=== Related articles ===
- The pentagram map, a discrete dynamical system which can be interpreted as a cluster algebra.

=== External links ===
- Fomin's Cluster algebra portal
- Fomin's papers on cluster algebras
