= Efkleidis Somos =

Greek politician and lawyer

Efkleidis Somos (Greek: Ευκλείδης Σώμος) was a Greek politician and lawyer. Somos was born in Korçë (Korytsa), in modern southern Albania. He was elected as member of the Greek parliament (1915-1917) for the Korytsa prefecture when his homeland came under Greek control.
