= The Holocaust in Greece =

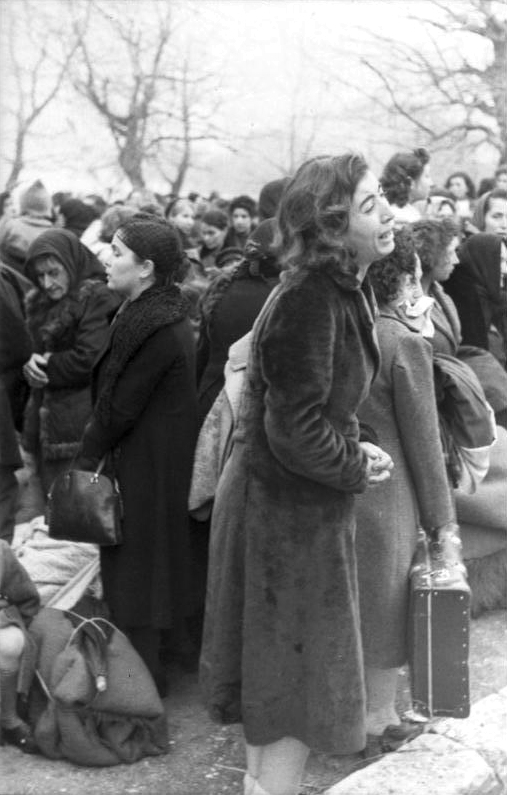
A young woman weeps during the deportation of the Romaniote Jews of Ioannina on 25 March 1944. Almost all were murdered at Auschwitz-Birkenau.

The Holocaust saw the mass murder of Greek Jews, as part of their deportation to Auschwitz concentration camp, by the Nazis during World War II. By 1945, between 82 and 92 percent of Greek Jews had been murdered, one of the highest proportions in Europe.

Before the war, approximately 72,000 to 77,000 Jews lived in 27 communities in Greece. The majority, about 50,000, lived in Salonica (Thessaloniki), a former Ottoman city captured and annexed by Greece in 1912. Most Greek Jews were Judeo-Spanish-speaking Sephardim (Jews originating on the Iberian Peninsula) with some being Greek-speaking Romaniotes (an ancient Jewish community native to Greece). Germany, Italy, and Bulgaria invaded and occupied Greece in April 1941. During the first year of the occupation, Greek Jews as well as Christians suffered from famine, property confiscation, and hostage killings.

In March 1943, just over 4,000 Jews were deported from the Bulgarian occupation zone to Treblinka extermination camp. From 15 March through August, almost all of Salonica's Jews, along with those of neighboring communities in the German occupation zone, were deported to Auschwitz concentration camp. After the Italian armistice in September 1943, Germany took over the Italian occupation zone, whose rulers had until then opposed the deportation of Jews. In March 1944, Athens, Ioannina, and other places in the former Italian occupation zone witnessed the roundup and deportation of their Jewish communities, although more Jews were able to escape than in the earlier deportations. In mid-1944, Jews living in the Greek islands were targeted. Around 10,000 Jews survived the Holocaust either by going into hiding, fighting with the Greek resistance, or surviving Nazi concentration camps.

Following World War II, surviving Jews faced obstacles regaining their property from non-Jews who had taken it over during the war. About half emigrated to Israel and other countries in the first decade after the war. The Holocaust was long overshadowed by other events during the wartime occupation, but gained additional prominence in the 21st century.

== Background ==

The Greek-speaking Romaniotes are the oldest Jewish community in Europe, dating back possibly as far as the sixth century BCE. Many Judeo-Spanish-speaking Sephardim settled in the Ottoman Empire, including areas that are now Greece, after their expulsion from Spain and Portugal at the end of the fifteenth century. Numerically and culturally, they came to dominate the earlier Romaniote community. The prewar Jewish communities of southern, western, and northern Greece each had a different history:

- Because of suspicion that they opposed the Greek insurgents, many Jews of the Peloponnese and Central Greece were massacred during the Greek War of Independence in the 1820s, while others fled to the Ottoman Empire. The newly independent Greek state established the Eastern Orthodox Church of Greece as the state religion shared by almost all inhabitants. Very few Jews remained in independent Greece, the largest community comprising fifty Romaniote families at Chalcis. After the establishment of the monarchy following independence, small numbers of Ashkenazim (Jews from Central Europe) as well as Sephardim from the Ottoman Empire settled in Athens, many in the service of the new king, Otto of Bavaria. They became well integrated into social and political life, considering themselves Greeks of the Jewish faith.
- Western Greece, especially Epirus, was home to a community of Romaniotes who settled along the area's trading routes, especially the Via Egnatia, during the early centuries CE. Emigration in the nineteenth and early twentieth century of the Jewish community of Ioannina left it with a few thousand Jews. Western Greece remained under Ottoman rule until the Balkan Wars in 1912–1913, when it was captured by Greece.
- Forced resettlement in Constantinople in 1455 by Sultan Mehmet II almost erased the Romaniote communities of Thrace, Macedonia, and Central Greece. At the end of the fifteenth century, the Ottoman Empire allowed Sephardim to resettle on the Aegean coast from Larissa west; Ashkenazi migrants joined them later, but the Sephardim remained dominant. Prior to World War II, about 50,000 Jews lived in Salonica (Thessaloniki), a center of Sephardic learning that historically held a Jewish majority and was termed the "Jerusalem of the Balkans". The city was heavily Hellenized as a result of the Great Fire of 1917, but the Jewish demographic plurality persisted until many Greek refugees from Eastern Thrace and Anatolia arrived in 1922.
- The Greek islands, especially Corfu, Rhodes, and Crete, were home to both Sephardic and Romaniote communities that had spent many years under Venetian rule or influence such that many Jews from these islands spoke Italian.

Before the Balkan Wars, no more than 10,000 Jews lived in Greece; this number would increase eightfold as a result of territorial acquisitions. Jews occasionally faced antisemitic violence such as the 1891 riots in Corfu and the 1931 Campbell pogrom, carried out by the National Union of Greece (EEE) in a suburb of Salonica. As a result of economic decline, many Jews left Greece after World War I. At first, wealthy merchants left for Europe, Latin America, and the United States. In the 1930s, many poorer Jews emigrated from Salonica to Mandatory Palestine. Under heavy pressure to Hellenize, Jews in Salonica gradually assimilated into the Greek majority and some young Jews spoke Greek as their first language. Historian Steven Bowman states that while the physical destruction of Greek Jews took place from 1943 to 1945, "an economic, social, and political assault predated the vicissitudes of World War II". The political fragmentation of Salonican Jews into opposing factions of conservative assimilationists, Zionists, and Communists hampered its ability to cope. In 1936, the Metaxas dictatorship overthrew unstable parliamentary politics. Upon the outbreak of World War II, some 72,000 to 77,000 Jews lived in 27 communities in Greece—the majority of them in Salonica.

== Axis occupation ==
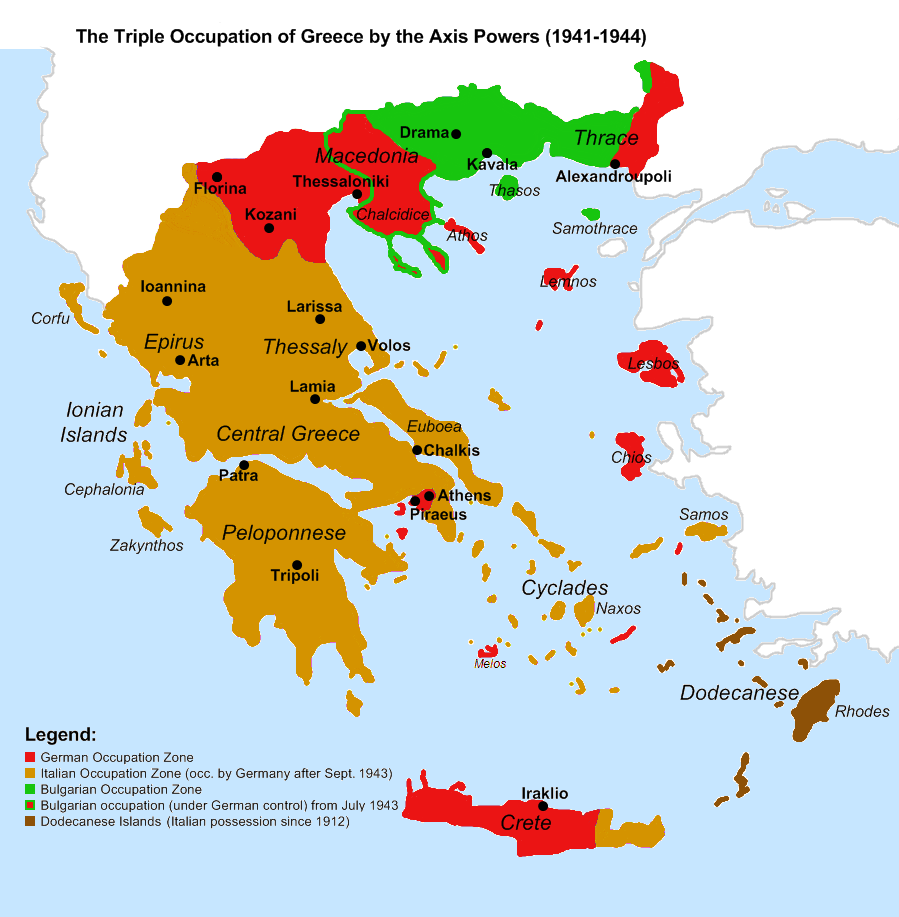

Early in the morning of 28 October 1940, Italy gave an ultimatum to dictator Ioannis Metaxas: if he did not allow Italian troops to occupy Greece, Italy would declare war. Metaxas refused and Italy immediately invaded Greece. The Jewish community reported that 12,898 Jews fought for Greece in the war; 613 died and 3,743 were wounded, most famously Colonel Mordechai Frizis. During the winter of 1940–1941, Italians and Greeks fought in Albania, but in April 1941, Germany joined the war and occupied all of mainland Greece by the end of the month and Crete in May. A group of generals announced a new government with German backing on 26 April, while the royal family was evacuated to Crete and then to Cairo, where the Greek government-in-exile was established. After a month, all Greek prisoners of war were released, including all Jewish soldiers.

In mid-1941, Greece was partitioned into three occupation zones. The Germans occupied strategically important areas: Macedonia including Salonica, the harbor of Piraeus, most of Crete and some of the Aegean islands, and allowed the Italians to take almost all the Greek mainland and many islands. Bulgaria occupied Western Thrace and eastern Macedonia, where it immediately undertook a harsh Bulgarianization program, sending more than 100,000 Greek refugees westward. The collaborationist Greek government began to see Bulgaria as the main threat and did all it could to secure German support for limiting the size of the Bulgarian occupation zone. However, in June 1943, parts of eastern Macedonia switched from German to Bulgarian control.

== Anti-Jewish persecution ==
Immediately after the occupation, German police units made arrests based on lists of individuals deemed subversive, including Greek Jewish intellectuals and the entire Salonica Jewish community council. The Reichsleiter Rosenberg Taskforce surveyed Jewish assets a week after the occupation. To curry favor with the Germans, collaborationist prime minister Georgios Tsolakoglou announced that there was a "Jewish problem" in Greece—the term was not a part of prewar discourse—adding, "this question will be definitively solved within the framework of the whole New Order in Europe".

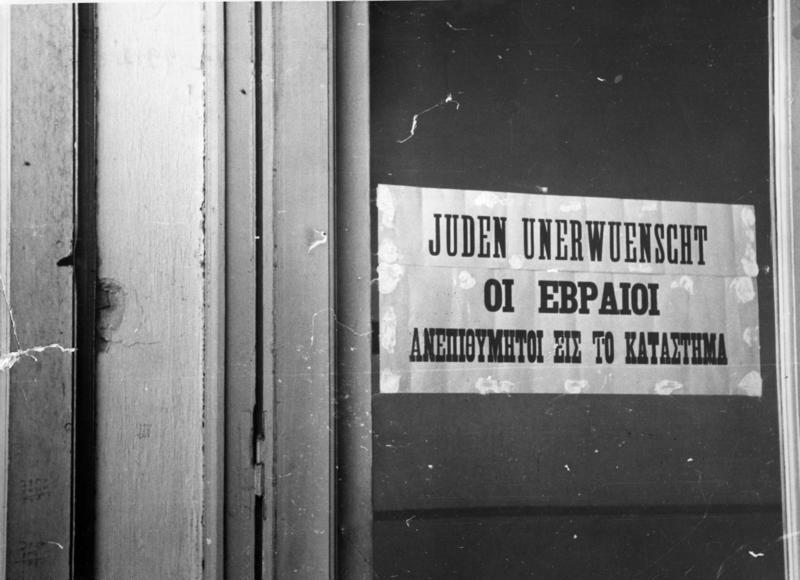
"Jews undesirable" placard in Salonica, 1941

Confiscation of all kinds of property from both Jews and non-Jews was undertaken on a massive scale; wealthy Jews were arrested and their businesses expropriated. During the first year of occupation, Jews shared in the same hardships as other Greeks, including the 1941 Greek famine and hyperinflation. Black market activity was widespread despite being punishable by immediate execution. The famine disproportionately affected Greek Jews as many were members of the urban proletariat and lacked connections to the countryside. In Salonica, German occupation forces tried to exacerbate the divisions between Greek Jews and the Christian population, encouraging newspapers to print antisemitic material and reviving the EEE, which Metaxas had banned. In the Bulgarian occupation zone, hundreds of Thracian Jews were forced into Bulgarian labor battalions, thus escaping famine and the deportation of Thracian Jews in 1943. In Macedonia, all recently arrived Jews, mostly a few hundred refugees from Yugoslavia, were required to register with the police in November 1941. A handful were immediately placed in German custody, deported, and executed.

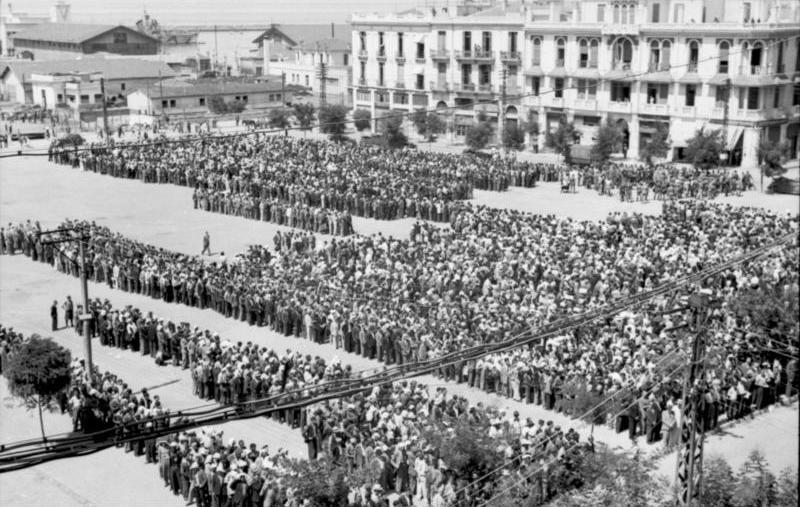
Roundup of 9,000 Jews in Salonica, 11 July 1942

Greek collaborators provided the names of alleged Communists to the German authorities, who held them as hostages and shot them in reprisal for resistance activities. Jews were overrepresented among these victims. In the second half of 1941, Jewish property in Salonica was confiscated on a large scale to rehouse Christians whose residences had been destroyed by bombing, or who had fled the Bulgarian occupation zone. In February 1942, the collaborationist government acceded to German demands and fired high-ranking official Georgios D. Daskalakis because of his alleged Jewish ancestry. Soon after it agreed to ban all Jews from leaving the country at German request.

On 11 July 1942, 9,000 Jewish men were rounded up for registration in Eleftherias Square in Salonika, in a joint operation by Germany and the Greek collaborationist government. The assembled Jews were publicly humiliated and forced to perform exercises. After this registration, as many as 3,500 Jewish men were drafted into labor battalions by Organization Todt, a Nazi civil and military engineering organization. Greek gendarmes guarded the forced laborers as they were transferred to work sites and former Greek military officers oversaw the work projects. Conditions were so harsh that hundreds of Jews died. Some escaped, but the Germans shot others in retaliation. Neither the Greek authorities nor the Orthodox Church made any protest. As a ransom for the laborers, the Jewish community paid two billion drachmas and gave up the extensive Jewish cemetery of Salonica, which the city administration had been trying to obtain for years. The municipality of Salonica destroyed the cemetery beginning in December 1942, and the city and the Greek Orthodox Church used many of the tombstones for construction. By the end of 1942, more than a thousand Jews had fled from Salonica to Athens—mostly the wealthy, as the journey cost 150,000 drachmas (£300, equivalent to £12,000 in 2025).

== Deportation ==
Places where Greek Jews were deported

More than 2,000 Greek Jews were deported in late 1942 to Auschwitz concentration camp during the Holocaust in France. Historian Christopher Browning argues that German dictator Adolf Hitler ordered the deportation of Salonica's Jews on 2 November 1941, citing a passage in Gerhard Engel's diary stating that Hitler "demands that the Jewish elements be removed from Salonika". Salonica's chief rabbi, Zvi Koretz, was interned in Vienna from May 1941 to January 1942—a year before the deportation process began in Salonica.

Building defenses for a possible Allied attack in the northern Aegean coincided with preparations for the deportation of Salonica's Jews and the deployment of German advisor Theodor Dannecker to Bulgaria, to ensure that Western Thrace was also cleared. Hitler believed that Jewish populations would hamper the Axis defenses in the event of invasion. According to historian Andrew Apostolou, the collaborationist Greek leadership continued to cooperate with the Germans to ward off Bulgarian aspirations for the permanent annexation of Western Thrace and Macedonia, while creating exonerating evidence in case the Allies won. Both the collaborationist administration and postwar governments used the war as an opportunity to Hellenize northern Greece, for example by the expulsion of Cham Albanians and the displacement of many ethnic Macedonians. This same area, from Corfu to the Turkish border, was most deadly for Jews during the Holocaust.

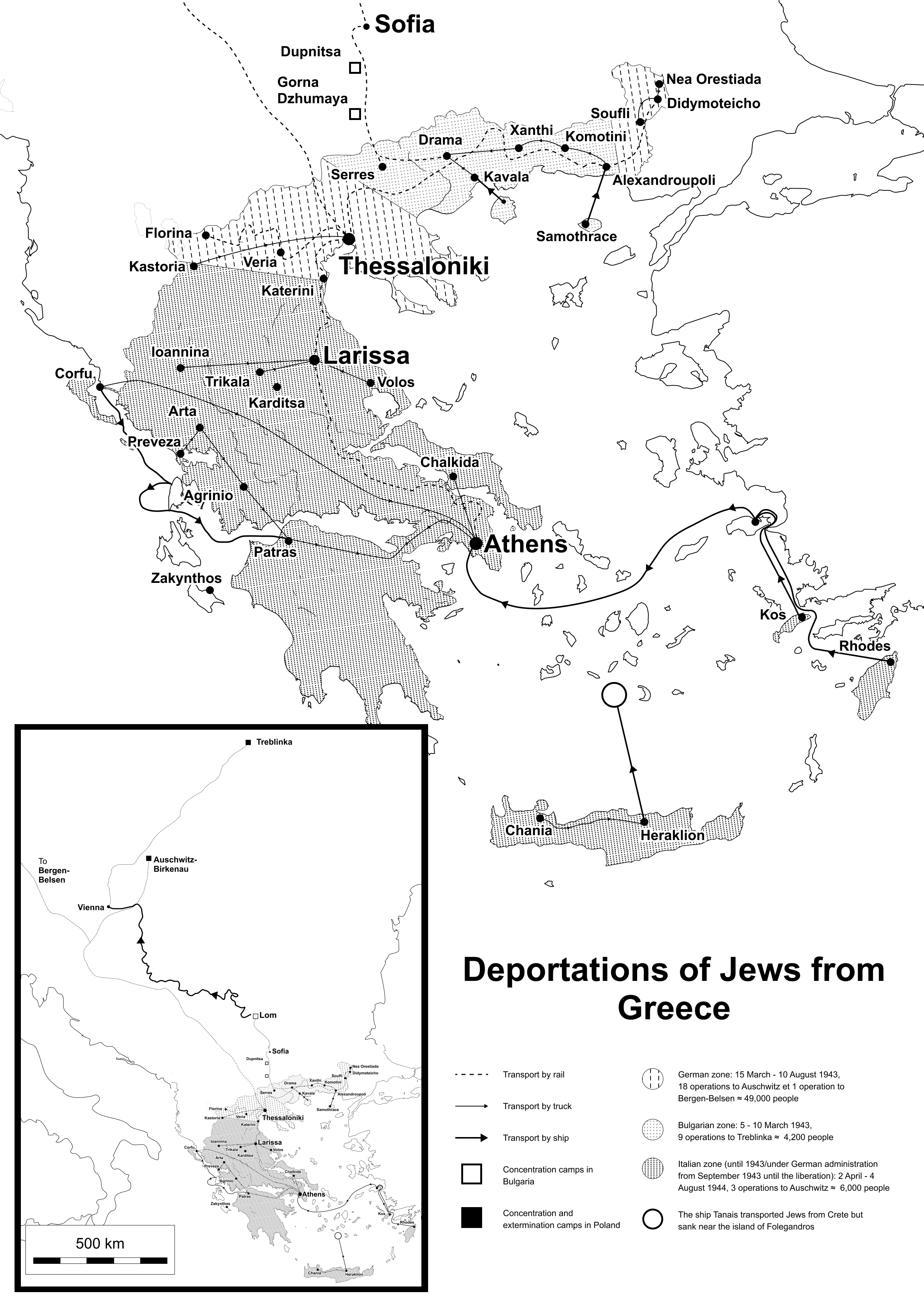
Deportations of Jews from Greece.1943-1944. Anastasios Karababas, In the Footsteps of the Jews of Greece (Prologue by Yiannis Boutaris), Vallentine Mitchell, London/Chicago, 2024, p.15

Overall, 60,000 Jews were deported from Greece to Auschwitz; around 12,750 were spared from immediate gassing and no more than 2,000 returned home after the war. Jews were not necessarily aware of the fate awaiting them, and some expected to be put to forced labor in Poland. The trains were packed so tightly that there was no space to sit down, and the journey took three weeks. As many as 50 percent died en route, some went mad, and most were unable to stand upon arriving at Auschwitz. Following the deportation, almost all Jewish-owned property was sold by the authorities, privately looted by Greeks, or nationalized by the Greek government. Almost everywhere, Christians went into Jewish districts immediately after they were vacated to loot.

=== Thrace (March 1943) ===
External videos
- Silent film of the deportation of Jews from Kavala, Serres, and Drama in Bulgarian-occupied northern Greece, March 1943

Before dawn on 4 March 1943, 4,058 of the 4,273 Jews in Bulgarian-occupied Macedonia and Western Thrace (Belomorie) were arrested. This roundup was planned on 22 February, and entailed the Bulgarian Army sealing off neighborhoods so that the police could conduct arrests based on lists of names and addresses. The Jews were then transferred to camps in Gorna Džumaja and Dupnica, held there for a few weeks, and then deported to Treblinka extermination camp via the Danube. In less than a month, 97 percent of the Jews in the Bulgarian occupation zone were murdered; none of those deported survived. Dannecker reported the deportation "was carried out without any particular reaction from local people". Bulgarian authorities saw the removal of non-Bulgarian ethnic groups, including Jews and Greeks, as a necessary step in making room for Bulgarian settlers.

=== Salonica (March–August 1943) ===
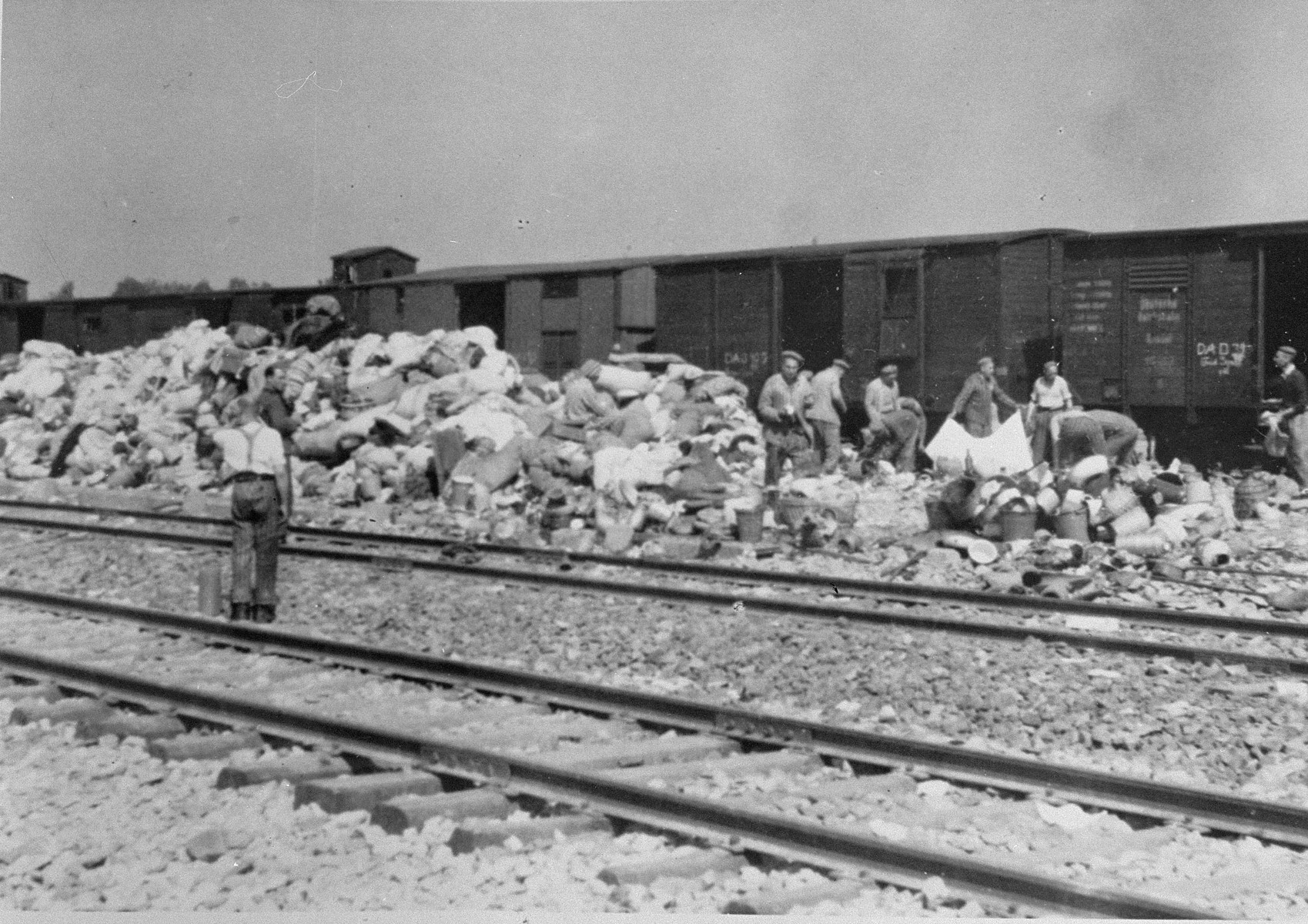
Prisoners sorting confiscated property at Auschwitz II-Birkenau, early 1944. Among them is Chaim Rephael, deported from Salonica.

Preparation for the deportation of Salonica's Jews began in January 1943. A German official, Günther Altenburg, notified the prime minister of the collaborationist government, Konstantinos Logothetopoulos, on 26 January, but there is no record of him taking action to prevent the deportations, except two letters of protest written after they had already begun. Despite the letters, the collaborationist government continued to cooperate with the deportation. The Italian occupation authorities and Consul Guelfo Zamboni vigorously protested, issued Italian citizenship to Greek Jews, and arranged travel to Athens for hundreds of Jews with Italian or foreign citizenship. Spanish officials in the region also attempted to stop the deportations.

On 6 February, the SS group tasked with the deportation arrived in the city and set up headquarters at 42 Velissariou Street in a confiscated Jewish villa. Its leaders, Alois Brunner and Dieter Wisliceny, stayed on the first floor while wealthy Jews were tortured in the basement. They had arrived with a series of anti-Jewish decrees intended to establish the Nuremberg laws and issued the first decree, requiring Jews without foreign citizenship to wear the yellow star, the same day. The Nazis set up the Baron Hirsch ghetto next to the train station, enclosed in barbed wire on 4 March. Regular Greek policemen guarded the ghetto while internal order was the responsibility of a Jewish police force. The first Jews transferred there were fifteen Jewish families from Langadas, but as many as 2,500 Jews occupied the area at a time.

Some Jews escaped to the mountains and joined resistance groups or fled to Athens, but most could not. To prevent escapes, twenty-five Jewish hostages were held and a curfew was imposed. German authorities tried to convince the Salonican Jews to cooperate by telling them that they would be resettled in Poland, giving them Polish money and allowing them to take some minor possessions when they left. The first transport from Salonica left on 15 March 1943. Most Jews were deported by mid-June, but the last of the transports departed on 10 August, carrying 1,800 Salonican Jewish men who had been engaged in forced labor projects. Altogether about 45,200 Jews were deported from Salonica to Auschwitz and another 1,700 from five other communities in the German occupation zone who were deported via Salonica: Florina and Veria in western Macedonia and Soufli, Nea Orestiada, and Didymoteicho in the strip along the Turkish border. Around 600 Jews, mostly Spanish citizens and members of the Jewish Council, were deported instead to Bergen-Belsen concentration camp. Overall, 96 percent of Jews from Salonica were murdered.

Following the cessation of all Jewish businesses on 6 March, it was discovered that 500 of 1,700 Jewish merchant agencies were involved in foreign commerce and their shutdown would cause commercial loss to German firms, leading to a decision to continue to operate the businesses under new ownership. At the end of May, a Greek government agency called Service for the Custody of Jewish Property was set up to oversee the property of deported Jews. Greeks expelled from Bulgarian-occupied areas were allowed to live in some of the formerly Jewish housing (11,000 apartments were confiscated from Jews) while many Germans and Greeks became wealthy from the proceeds of expropriated assets. The total value of Jewish-owned property, according to declarations, was about 11 billion drachma (approximately £11 million, £450 million in 2025), a significant part of which was transferred to the Greek state. Despite anti-looting orders from the German occupiers, many Jewish-owned houses were torn up by Greek Christians looking for hidden gold coins. Gold confiscated from Jews was used to ward off inflation and had a significant impact on the Greek economy. Historian Kostis Kornetis states, "the elimination of Jews from [Salonica]'s economic life was eventually welcomed by both elites and the general public".

=== Passover roundup (March 1944) ===
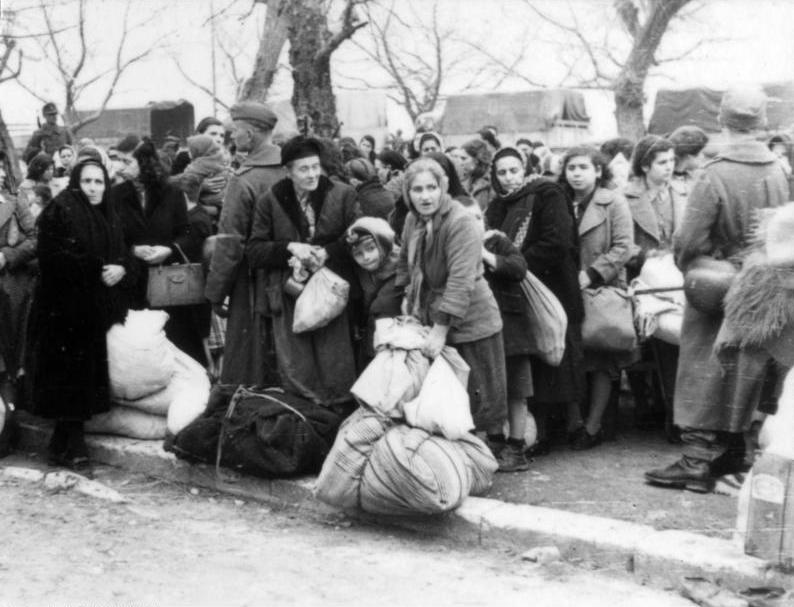
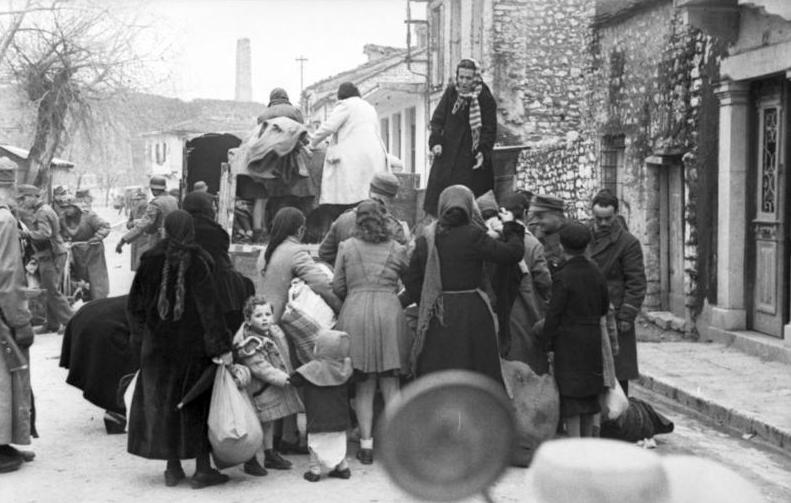
Deportation of Jews from Ioannina, 25 March 1944, photographs by Wehrmacht Propaganda Troops

In September 1943, Germany occupied the Italian occupation zone following the Armistice of Cassibile. The remaining fifteen Jewish communities had fewer than 2,000 people and were near ports or major roads. Jürgen Stroop was appointed Higher SS and Police Leader of occupied Greece, partly to facilitate the deportation of Athenian Jews. Stroop ordered the chief rabbi of Athens, Elias Barzilai, to produce a list of Jews. Barzilai said that the community register had been destroyed during a raid by the collaborationist Hellenic Socialist Patriotic Organization (EPSO) the previous year. Stroop ordered him to make a new list. Instead Barzilai warned Jews to flee and absconded with the help of the left-wing National Liberation Front (EAM) resistance group. Barzilai negotiated a deal with EAM; in exchange for sheltering Jews in rebel-controlled areas, he paid the Jewish community's entire cash reserve.

On 4 October, Stroop instituted a curfew for Jews and ordered them to register at the synagogue. Despite the threat of the death penalty for Jews failing to register and any Christian helpers, only 200 registered, while many others followed Barzilai's example and fled. Without sufficient troops, and faced with the opposition of the collaborationist Greek government headed by Ioannis Rallis, the Nazis had to put off deportation operations until the following year. Under pressure, Rallis passed laws for the confiscation of property owned by Jews. While wealthy and middle-class Jews were able to go into hiding, those who registered with the authorities came from the lower classes in society who lacked the financial resources to escape. Over the next six months, additional Jews were lured out of hiding as their resources were exhausted. The delay in implementing deportation led to complacency among some Jews. In some places, Jews did not take the opportunity to escape because of a lack of awareness of the threat, failure of Jewish leadership, negative attitudes to the resistance, and reluctance to leave family members behind.

In January 1944, Adolf Eichmann replaced Wisliceny with Anton Burger, tasked with deporting Greece's Jews as quickly as possible. In March 1944, the Jewish holiday Passover was used as a cover for coordinated roundups around Greece carried out by the Geheime Feldpolizei (German military police) and Greek gendarmerie. On 23 March, unleavened bread was distributed at a synagogue in Athens—the 300 Jews who had tried to collect the bread were arrested, and others hunted down later that day based on registration lists. The Greek police generally refused to arrest any Jews not on the list, sparing the lives of a number of young children. At the end of the day, the 2,000 Jews caught were imprisoned at Haidari concentration camp outside the city. On 24 March, Jews from all the remaining communities in mainland Greece were arrested, including Patras, Chalcis, Ioannina, Arta, Preveza, Larissa, Volos, and Kastoria. Most of the Jews in Ioannina and Kastoria were arrested, with higher percentages escaping elsewhere. On 2 April, a train departed from Athens, adding additional Jews during its journey north. Nearly five thousand Jews were deported from Greece, arriving in Auschwitz nine days later.

=== Deportation from Greek islands (June–August 1944) ===
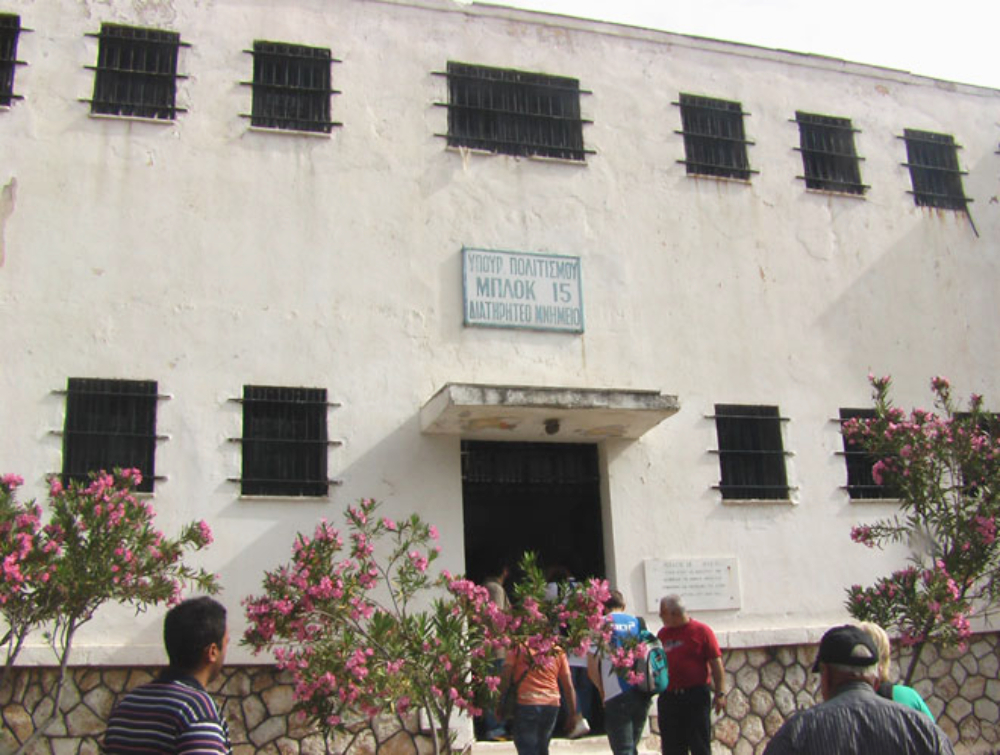
Haidari concentration camp block 15 in 2009

After the Passover roundup, the Nazis focused on the Jewish communities of the Greek islands. The entire Cretan Jewish community, 314 people in Chania and 26 in Heraklion, were rounded up on 20 May and departed from Souda Bay on 7 June onboard the SS Tanais. All 340 died when Tanais was sunk by the British submarine HMS Vivid on 9 June. After the 1943 armistice, the Italian garrison of Corfu refused to surrender, and Germany forcibly occupied the island following battles that left the Jewish quarter in ruins. Despite warnings from the Italian soldiers, the Jews did not go into hiding in the mountains. On 8 June, the Jews of Corfu were rounded up and deported by ship and rail to Haidari. The Mayor of Corfu stated, "Our good friends the Germans have cleansed the island from the Jewish riffraff"—the only case where a Greek official publicly approved of the deportation of Jews. The Corfu Jews were deported from Haidari to Poland on 21 June.

The Dodecanese islands had been under Italian control since 1912. In late 1943, after Italy joined the Allies, Allied forces were sent to the islands to prevent them from falling into German hands. Thousands of Dodecanese Christians left with Allied ships destined for Cyprus and Palestine, but Kos' small Jewish community remained on the island. On 23 July 1944, roughly 1,700 Jews from Rhodes (Note: Variously reported as 1,651 or 1,661) were forced to board a boat. The boat stopped to load just under 100 (Note: Variously reported as 94, 96, or 98) Jews from Kos and arrived at the port of Piraeus eight days later. Together with around 700 to 900 Jews captured in and around Athens, they were deported to Auschwitz on 3 August, arriving on 16 August. The survivor Samuel Modiano from Rhodes reported: " The arrest took place on 18 and 19 July on the island and we arrived in Auschwitz on 16 August. One month of travel... Instead of killing us on the spot, on our island, we were transported to the camps and murdered in secret. And what a death...in the gas chambers! That's when I lost my faith in God!" Only 157 (nine percent) of the Jews from Rhodes and Kos returned. This operation, the last deportation during the Holocaust in Greece, was carried out two months before the end of the Axis occupation. The few Jews who were hiding on smaller islands were left alone.

== Evasion and resistance ==
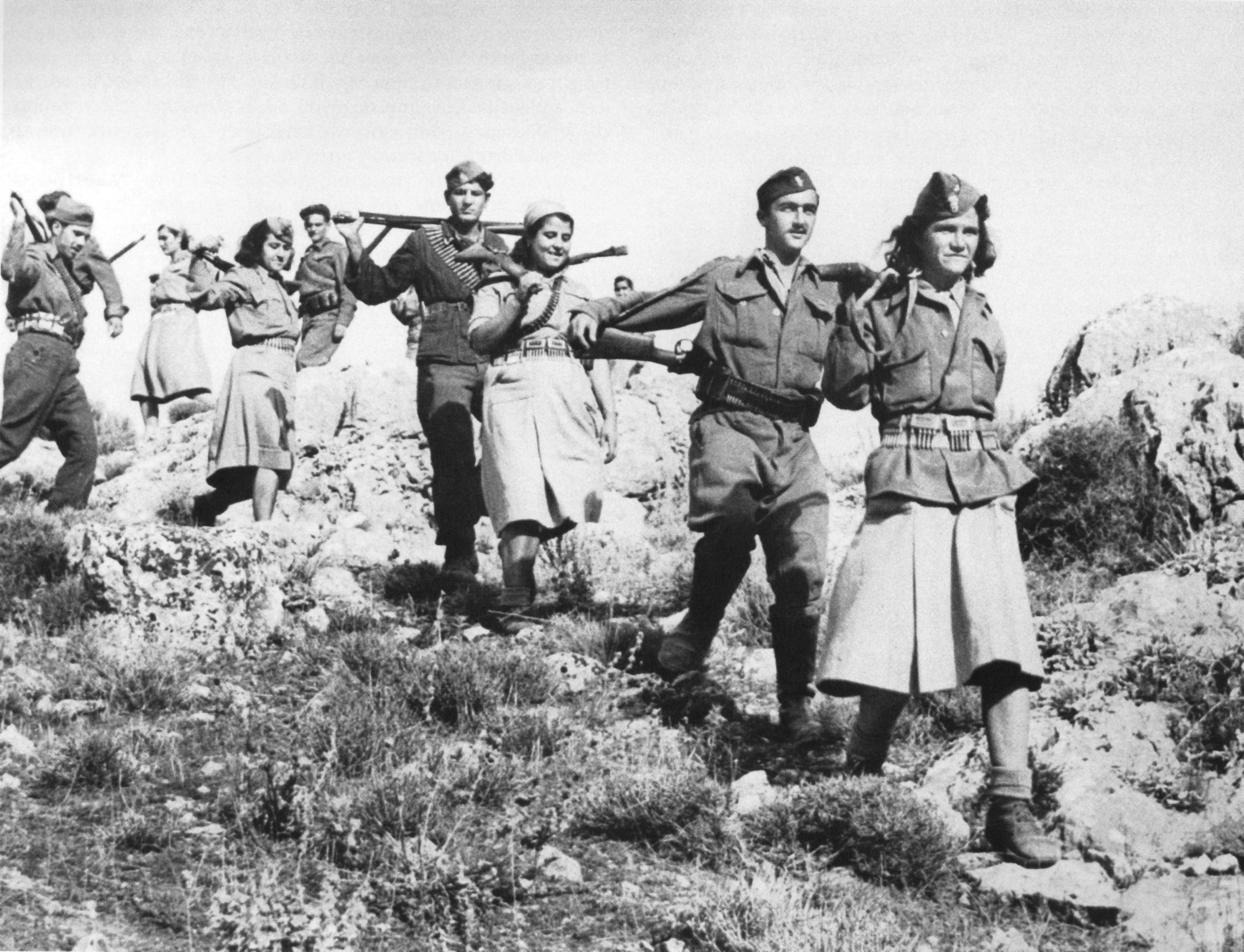
ELAS fighters in October 1944, including Salvatore Bacolas (second from right), a Greek Jew

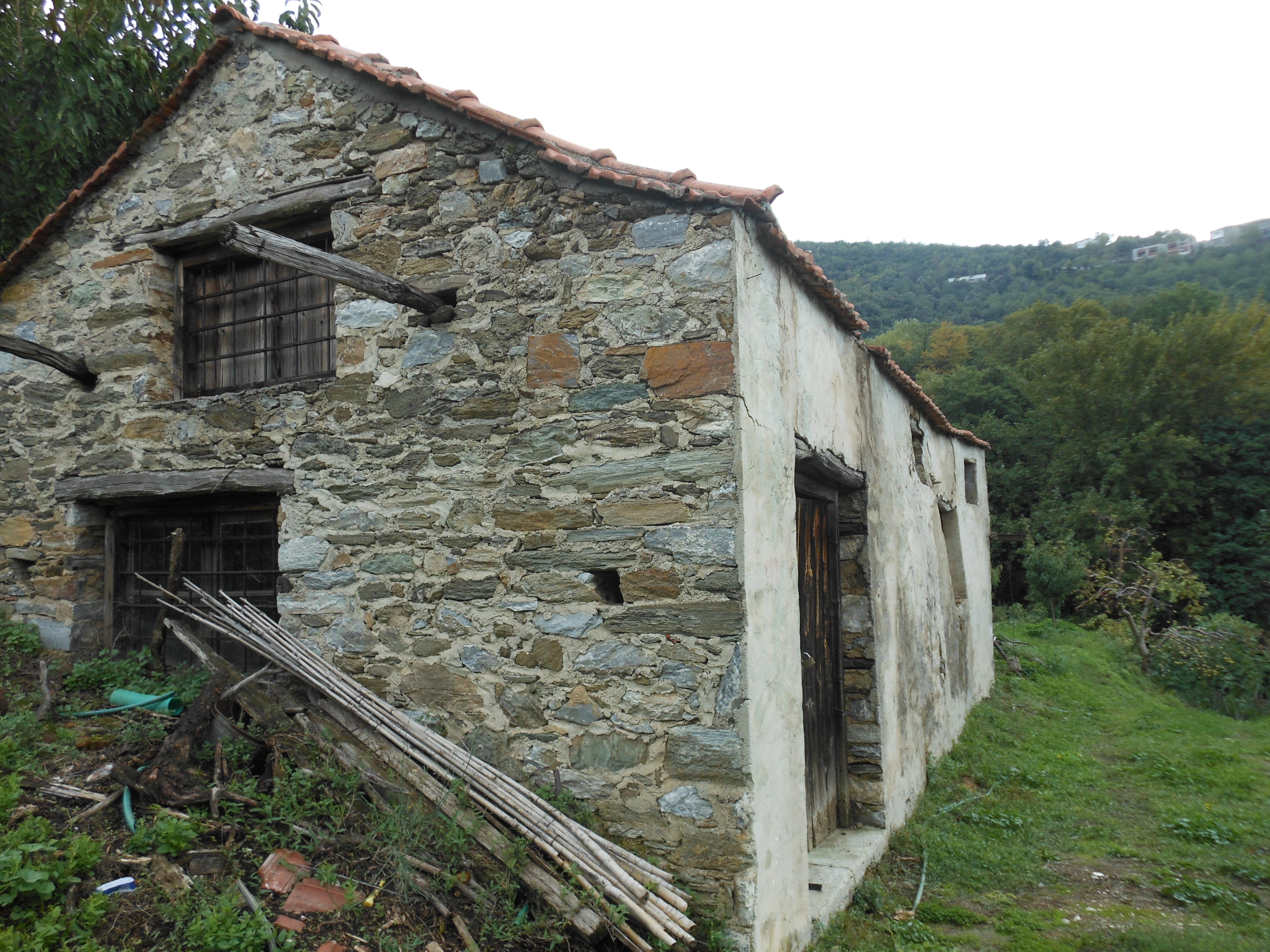
Storage building in Lachonia where Jews lived in hiding

Regional survival rates varied greatly because of a variety of factors, such as timing of deportations, the attitude of the local authorities, and the degree of integration of Jewish communities. According to Greek Holocaust survivor Michael Matsas, the decisive factors influencing survival rates were the strength of resistance organizations and the reaction of the Jewish leadership. After the deportation of the Jews of Salonica and the end of the Italian occupation zone, thousands of Jews in other parts of Greece joined the resistance or went into hiding. In many parts of Thessaly, Central Greece (including Athens), and the Peloponnese, Holocaust deaths were relatively low. The activities of the left-wing resistance in Thessaly are credited with the higher survival rate there. Some smaller Jewish communities, including those of Karditsa and Agrinio (around 80 people each), completely escaped to the mountain villages controlled by EAM's Greek People's Liberation Army (ELAS); 55 Jews from Veria were hidden in the nearby village of Sykia for fifteen to seventeen months.

At least two thirds of the Jews living in Athens and Larissa before the war survived.

Archbishop Damaskinos, the head of the Church of Greece, issued strongly worded protests against the mistreatment of Greek Jews and issued many false baptismal certificates. He was the only leader of a major European church to condemn the Holocaust. The chief of police in Athens, Angelos Evert, saved hundreds of Jews by issuing false papers. The 275 Jews of Zakynthos were entirely spared because the Austrian garrison commander (from the 999th Light Afrika Division) did not execute the deportation order following protests by the local mayor and the Orthodox Christian prelate, who turned over their own names when ordered to submit a list of Jews. Historian Giorgos Antoniou states that, "the line between selfless and selfish assistance is more often than not hard to distinguish", and robbery of Jews in hiding was "not rare". Unlike in other countries, Greek rabbis encouraged Jews to accept false baptismal certificates. Many Jews in hiding converted to Christianity and did not necessarily return to Judaism after the war.

The Greek resistance readily accepted Jewish volunteers into its ranks; at least 650 Jewish resistance fighters are known by name, and there may have been as many as 2,000. Jews mostly fought in ELAS but there were also some in the rival resistance organizations EDES (National Republican Greek League) and National and Social Liberation (EKKA). Unlike the other resistance organizations, EAM publicly appealed to Greeks to help their Jewish fellow citizens, and actively recruited young Jews to join ELAS. Thousands of Jews, perhaps as many as 8,000, received assistance from EAM/ELAS. In some cases, EAM refused to help Jews if it did not receive payment. Greek smugglers charged Jews 300 Palestine pounds per boat, carrying around two dozen Jews, to take them to Çeşme in Turkey via Euboea, but later ELAS and the Haganah negotiated a price of one gold piece per Jew. By June 1944, 850 Jews had escaped to Çeşme.

== Aftermath ==
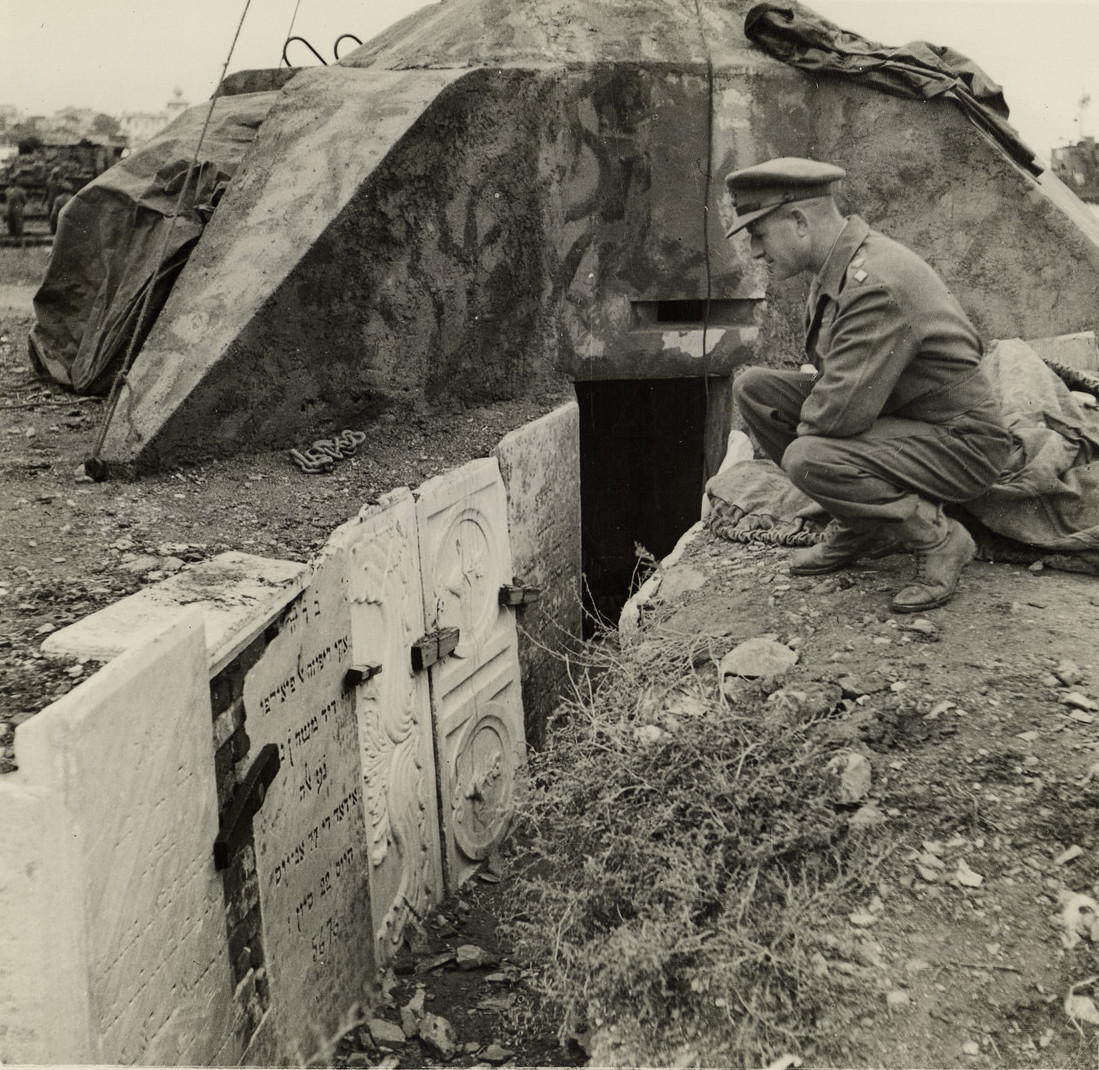
A British officer looking at gravestones from the desecrated Jewish cemetery of Salonica, 1944

Axis occupation forces withdrew from all of mainland Greece by November 1944. About 10,000 Greek Jews survived the Holocaust, representing a death rate of 83 to 87 percent. This was the highest Holocaust death rate in the Balkans and among the highest in Europe. The survivors were sharply divided between the camp survivors and the larger number who survived in Greece or returned from abroad. About half those who returned from the concentration camps only stayed briefly in Greece before emigrating while others remained abroad. The Greek foreign ministry attempted to delay or prevent their return to Greece. In Salonica, Jewish camp survivors were often called "unused cakes of soap" by other Greeks. Almost everyone had lost family members. The disintegration of families as well as unavailability of religious professionals made it almost impossible to maintain traditional Jewish religious observance.

In November 1944, the returning Greek government-in-exile annulled the law confiscating Jewish property and passed the first measure in Europe for the return of this property to its Jewish owners or their heirs, and of heirless property to Jewish organizations. However, this law was not applied in practice. Lacking any property or place to live and not helped by local authorities, Jews found themselves sleeping in improvised shelters in conditions that were compared to the Nazi concentration camps. Most Jews found it difficult or impossible to regain properties taken over by non-Jews during the war. In Salonica, 15 percent or less of Jewish property was returned and only 30 Jews were successful in recovering all their real estate. Postwar return of property, however, was somewhat easier in the former Italian-occupied zone. Greek courts usually ruled against survivors, and failure to regain property led many Jews to emigrate; emigrants lost their Greek citizenship and any claim to property in Greece. Conflict over property also fueled antisemitic incidents. Jewish cemeteries faced expropriation and destruction even after the war. West Germany paid reparations to Greece but no money was set aside to compensate Greek Jews.

As in other European countries, American Jewish charities, especially the American Jewish Joint Distribution Committee (JDC), coordinated relief efforts to aid survivors. Skeptical that Jews had a future in southeastern Europe, the JDC prioritized aid for those seeking to emigrate to Palestine. Sephardic Jews in the United States raised money to pay dowries so that Greek Jews could marry, as well as sending items such as clothing, shoes, and food. Zionists organized hakhshara programs intended to prepare Jews for emigration to Mandatory Palestine.

Many Jews supported left-wing parties prior to World War II, and the help they received from EAM strengthened their leftist sympathies. These connections made them politically suspect, to the point that some Greeks repeated Nazi propaganda equating Jews with Communism. Some Jews suspected of left-wing sympathies were arrested, tortured, or assassinated during the anti-leftist repression in 1945 and 1946. In contrast, the political climate allowed Nazi collaborators to rebrand themselves as loyal, anti-communist citizens. The Greek government avoided prosecuting collaborators and in 1959 passed a law (repealed in 2010) that prevented any prosecution of Holocaust perpetrators for crimes committed in Greece. For decades, the Greek government refused repeated requests from the Jewish community to extradite and try Brunner, who was living in Syria. Across the political spectrum, a high-profile trial that would draw attention to the Holocaust in northern Greece was seen as undesirable.

From 1946 to 1949, the Greek Civil War was fought between the monarchist government and leftist insurgents that had succeeded EAM/ELAS. According to Bowman, "there was a strong current of antisemitism and traditional Jew hatred" in the anti-Communist coalition. Some Jews were drafted into the government army, while others fought with the insurgents. After the defeat of the insurgents, some Jewish Communists were executed or imprisoned, and others systematically marginalized from society. Jews' distinct religion in a state that was increasingly defined by Greek Orthodoxy, as well as their sympathy for the political left—purged after the Greek Civil War—contributed to their increasing alienation from Greek society. Within a decade after the war, the Jewish population of Greece had reduced by half and has remained stable since. In 2017, Greece passed a law allowing Greek Holocaust survivors and their descendants who had lost their Greek citizenship to regain it. As of 2021, around 5,000 Jews live in Greece, mostly in Athens (3,000) and Salonica (1,000).

== Legacy ==
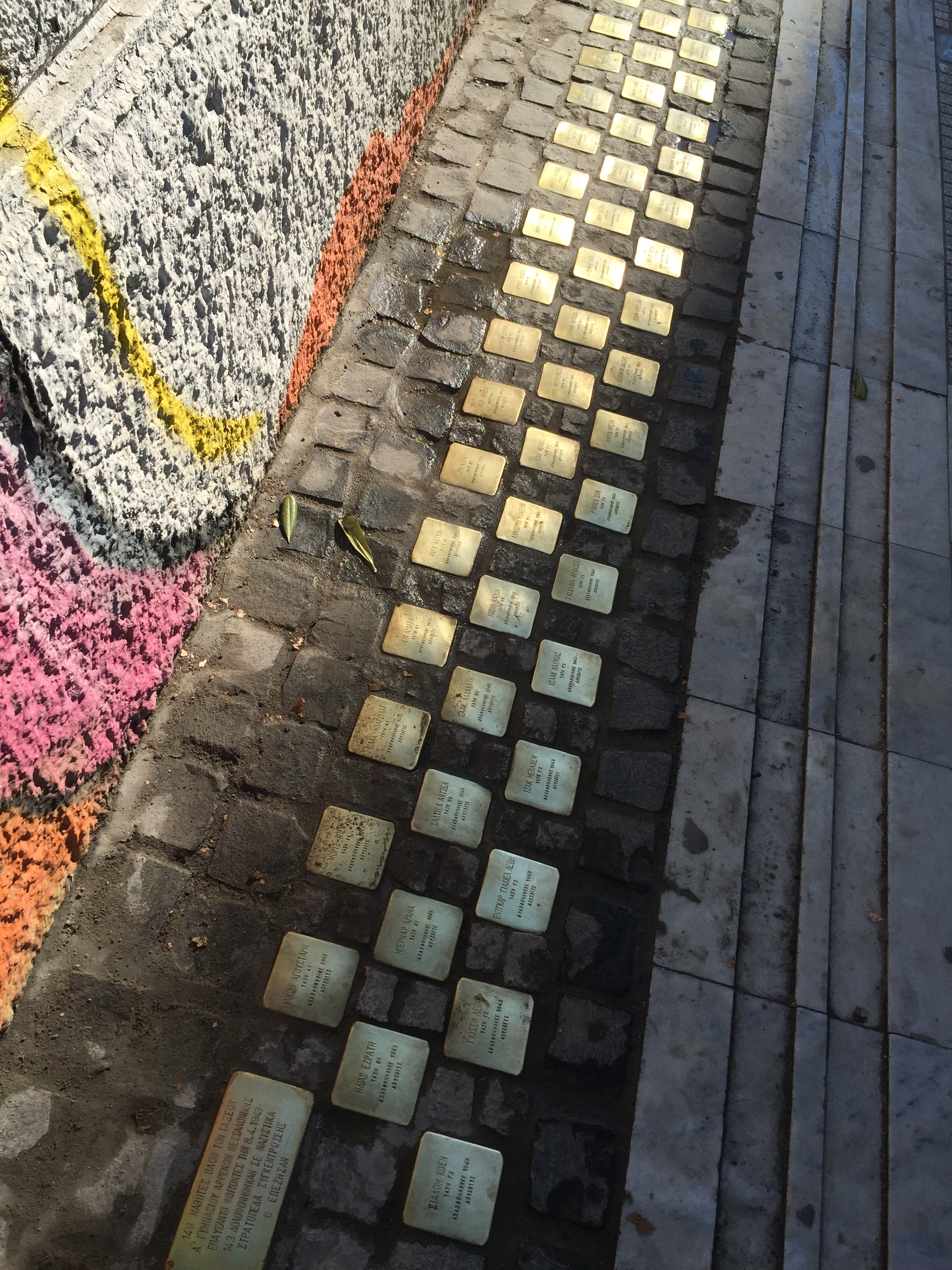
Stolpersteine in Salonica to commemorate deported school children

The Holocaust in Greece, long overshadowed by other events like the Greek famine, Greek resistance, and the Greek Civil War, was clouded in Greek memory by exaggerated beliefs about the degree of solidarity shown by average Greek Christians. Another reason for lack of attention to the Holocaust was the relatively high level of antisemitism in Greece, which was considered higher than in any other country in the pre-2004 European Union. Pro-Palestinian sympathies in Greece led to an environment where Jews were not distinguished from Israel and antisemitism could be passed off as a principled anti-Zionism. Holocaust denial is promoted by some Greeks, especially the extremist Golden Dawn party.

Historian Katherine Elizabeth Fleming writes that often, "the story of the destruction of Greece's Jews has served as a vehicle for the celebration of Greek Orthodox kindness and valor". Fleming states that while some acted heroically in rescuing Jews, "at times, Greek Christians were complicit in the destruction of Jewish lives; many more were unmoved by it; and no small number welcomed it". Academic research into the Holocaust did not begin until decades afterwards and is still sparse. Questions of Greek collaborationism were taboo for scholars and only began to be examined in the twenty-first century.

In 2005, Greece joined the International Holocaust Remembrance Alliance and subsequently introduced Holocaust education into the national curriculum. Athens was reported to be the last European capital without a Holocaust memorial, prior to its completion in 2010. There are also memorials in Salonica (one in Eleftherias Square and another at the site of the old Jewish cemetery), Rhodes, Ioannina, Kavala, Larissa, and elsewhere. Holocaust memorials in Greece have been vandalized repeatedly. In 1977, the Jewish Museum of Greece opened in Athens, and in 2018 the first stone of the Holocaust Museum of Greece in Salonica was laid, although construction has not begun as of 2022. As of 2021, 362 Greeks have been recognized by Yad Vashem as Righteous Among the Nations for helping to save Jews during the occupation.

== Sources ==
- Antoniou, Giorgos; Moses, A. Dirk (2018). "Introduction". The Holocaust in Greece. Cambridge University Press. pp. 1–12. ISBN 978-1-108-47467-2.
- Antoniou, Giorgos (2018). "Bystanders, Rescuers, and Collaborators: A Microhistory of Christian–Jewish Relations, 1943–1944". The Holocaust in Greece. Cambridge University Press. pp. 135–156. ISBN 978-1-108-47467-2.
- Apostolou, Andrew (2018). "Greek Collaboration in the Holocaust and the Course of the War". The Holocaust in Greece. Cambridge University Press. pp. 89–112. ISBN 978-1-108-47467-2.
- Balodimas-Bartolomei, Angelyn (2016). "Political and Pedagogical Dimensions in Holocaust Education: Teacher Seminars and Staff Development in Greece". Diaspora, Indigenous, and Minority Education. 10 (4): 242–254. doi:10.1080/15595692.2016.1219847.
- Bantiou, Marina (2026). "Oral Histories of Jewish Hidden Children Across Thessaly During the Axis Occupation of Greece (1941–1944)". Eastern European Holocaust Studies. 4 (1): 147–169. doi:10.1515/eehs-2025-0017.
- Battinou, Zanet (2003). "The Jewish Museum of Greece: Brief Description, Mission, Issues and Programmes". European Judaism: A Journal for the New Europe. 36 (2): 41–47. doi:10.3167/001430003782266125. ISSN 0014-3006. JSTOR 41443651.
- Blümel, Tobias (2021). "The Case of Alois Brunner and the Divided Consciousness in Processing the Holocaust in Greece". Südosteuropa Mitteilungen (2–3): 93–106. ISSN 0340-174X. CEEOL 955062.
- Bowman, Steven B. (2009). The Agony of Greek Jews, 1940–1945. Stanford University Press. ISBN 978-0-8047-7249-5.
- Chandrinos, Iason; Droumpouki, Anna Maria (2018). "The German Occupation and the Holocaust in Greece: A Survey". The Holocaust in Greece. Cambridge University Press. pp. 15–35. ISBN 978-1-108-47467-2.
- Droumpouki, Anna Maria (2016). "Shaping Holocaust memory in Greece: memorials and their public history". National Identities. 18 (2): 199–216. Bibcode:2016NatId..18..199D. doi:10.1080/14608944.2015.1027760.
- Droumpouki, Anna Maria (2021). "A Difficult Return: Aspects of the Rebuilding of the Jewish Communities in Greece, 1945–1947". Journal of Jewish Identities. 14 (2): 135–154. doi:10.1353/jji.2021.0027. S2CID 240370446.
- Fleming, Katherine Elizabeth (2008). Greece: A Jewish History. Princeton University Press. ISBN 978-0-691-10272-6.
- Fleming, Katherine E. (2018). "Gray Zones". The Holocaust in Greece. Cambridge University Press. pp. 361–370. ISBN 978-1-108-47467-2.
- Hantzaroula, Pothiti (2019). "Postwar Identity in the Making: Hidden Children in Volos (Greece)". Historein. 18 (1). doi:10.12681/historein.14627. ISSN 2241-2816.
- Karababas, Anastasios (2024). In the Footsteps of the Jews of Greece: From Ancient Times to the Present Day. Vallentine Mitchell. ISBN 978-1-80371-043-3.
- Karasová, Nikola; Králová, Kateřina (2022). "The Holocaust Museum of Greece, Thessaloniki: In Whose Memory?". Nationalities Papers. 51 (3): 622–643. doi:10.1017/nps.2021.85. S2CID 249827508.
- Kavala, Maria (2018). "The Scale of Jewish Property Theft in Nazi-occupied Thessaloniki". The Holocaust in Greece. Cambridge University Press. pp. 183–207. ISBN 978-1-108-47467-2.
- Kerem, Yitzchak (2012). "The Greek Government-in-exile and the Rescue of Jews from Greece". Holocaust Studies. 18 (2–3): 189–212. doi:10.1080/17504902.2012.11087301.
- Kornetis, Kostis (2018). "Expropriating the Space of the Other: Property Spoliations of Thessalonican Jews in the 1940s". The Holocaust in Greece. Cambridge University Press. pp. 228–252. ISBN 978-1-108-47467-2.
- Králová, Kateřina (2018). "Being a Holocaust Survivor in Greece: Narratives of the Postwar Period, 1944–1953". The Holocaust in Greece. Cambridge University Press. pp. 304–326. ISBN 978-1-108-47467-2.
- Mazower, Mark (2004). Salonica, City of Ghosts: Christians, Muslims and Jews 1430-1950. Knopf Doubleday Publishing Group. ISBN 978-0-307-42757-1.
- McElligott, Anthony (2018). "The Deportation of the Jews of Rhodes, 1944: An Integrated History". The Holocaust in Greece. Cambridge University Press. pp. 58–86. ISBN 978-1-108-47467-2.
- Mojzes, Paul (2011). Balkan Genocides : Holocaust and Ethnic Cleansing in the Twentieth Century (eBook ed.). Lanham: Rowman & Littlefield Publishers. ISBN 978-1442206656.
- Naar, Devin E. (2016). Jewish Salonica: Between the Ottoman Empire and Modern Greece. Stanford University Press. ISBN 978-0-8047-9887-7.
- Naar, Devin E. (2018). ""You are Your Brother's Keeper": Rebuilding the Jewish Community of Salonica from Afar". The Holocaust in Greece. Cambridge University Press. pp. 273–303. ISBN 978-1-108-47467-2.
- Saltiel, Leon (2018). "A City against Its Citizens? Thessaloniki and the Jews". The Holocaust in Greece. Cambridge University Press. pp. 113–134. ISBN 978-1-108-47467-2.
- Wetzel, Juliane (2015). "Frankreich und Belgien" [France and Belgium]. Dimension des Völkermords: Die Zahl der jüdischen Opfer des Nationalsozialismus [Dimension of the genocide: the number of Jewish victims of Nazism] (in German). Oldenbourg Wissenschaftsverlag. pp. 105–137. doi:10.1524/9783486708332.105. ISBN 978-3-486-70833-2. S2CID 163310251.
