= Campbell pogrom =

1931 antisemitic attacks in Thessaloniki

- Part of antisemitism in Greece
- Ruins of Campbell after the pogrom
- Date: 29–30 June 1931
- Location: Campbell, Kalamaria, Thessaloniki, Greece; 40.5841501°N 22.9676707°E
- Target: Jewish homes and businesses
- Participants: Members of nationalist organisations, particularly EEE; Christian refugees from Asia Minor; Reserve soldiers
- Outcome: Destruction of the Campbell neighborhood; Emigration of c. 30,000 Jews to France and Palestine; Trial and acquittal of the perpetrators of the pogrom
- Casualties: 2 residents killed, dozens injured, estimated 2 million drachmas of damage (Note: 2 million drachmas in 1931 was approximately equivalent to $25,800, or approximately equivalent to $546,204 in 2025.)

The Campbell pogrom, also known as the Campbell riot, was an antisemitic pogrom that took place on 29–30 June 1931 in the Campbell neighbourhood of Kalamaria in Thessaloniki, in the Macedonia region of northern Greece.

Campbell was an impoverished Jewish settlement, set up in the aftermath of the Great Thessaloniki Fire of 1917 to house Jewish refugees. The fire severely damaged the economic position of Thessaloniki's traditionally strong Jewish community. During the 1920s, the Jews became politically isolated, and were held responsible by the Venizelist political faction for both the Venizelists' defeat in the 1920 Greek legislative election and the Greek defeat in the Greco-Turkish War of 1919–1922. In the mid-1920s, the first fascist organisations appeared in Thessaloniki, and engaged in antisemitic activities with tacit governmental approval. Venizelist newspapers, particularly Makedonia, ran articles characterising the Jews as a foreign population that sought the destruction of Greece. While antisemitism had little prominence in Greek national politics, it became an important force in Venizelist politics in northern Greece, and among Christian refugees from Asia Minor and Eastern Thrace.

Encouraged by false accusations of Jewish collaboration with Bulgarians and communists to bring about the independence of Macedonia from Greece, refugees from Asia Minor, reservists of the Hellenic Army and members of nationalist organisations enacted a campaign of antisemitic violence and intimidation throughout June 1931. Following limited responses from the local authorities, including the governor-general of Macedonia, Stylianos Gonatas, nationalists attacked several Jewish neighbourhoods on the night of 29–30 June 1931. The greatest violence took place at Campbell, where the attacks resulted in the destruction of the neighbourhood, the deaths of a Christian resident, and dozens of injuries. Other attacks took place in other Jewish neighbourhoods, including one in the "151" camp in Kato Toumba, in which a Jewish resident, Leon Vidal, was fatally wounded. Local authorities largely failed to prevent violence, and hindered attempts by Jewish residents to resist the attacks.

In the ensuing trial, the perpetrators of the attack were all acquitted, while members of the Hellenic Parliament defended the pogrom as an act of patriotism. The government of Eleftherios Venizelos stated that it would support the Jewish community, but provided minimal financial assistance towards its recovery, with the result that thousands of Jews permanently left Thessaloniki, particularly for France and Palestine. The city's Jewish community remained substantially alienated and weakened until the imposition of a dictatorship under Ioannis Metaxas in 1936.

== Background ==
Thessaloniki had been a centre of Greek Judaism for centuries, and Jews remained the largest ethnic group in the city until around 1912. Most of the Jewish population were Sephardic speakers of Ladino, which was widely spoken as a lingua franca in the city until the 1910s. The Jews were treated with suspicion by the Greek government; during the Balkan Wars of 1912–1913, as a result of which Thessaloniki was annexed by Greece, the Jewish community had openly supported the former Ottoman rulers, and the arrival of Greek forces in the city had been followed by attacks on Jews and their property. Around a third of the Jewish population, disproportionately drawn from the wealthier sections of society, emigrated in the first decade of Greek rule.

In 1912, the Greek state unsuccessfully attempted to expropriate Jewish cemeteries. The Great Thessaloniki Fire of 1917 severely damaged the city's Jewish quarter: it completely destroyed two majority-Jewish areas of the city, as well as thirty-two of its thirty-seven synagogues. The fire forced Jews to abandon their previously concentrated quarter of the city. In its aftermath, the Jewish community were economically impoverished and disillusioned by a perception that the state had acted against them in its response to the fire. The total number of displaced people exceeded 70,000, of whom more than 50,000 were Jews, but the Greek government prioritised finding homes for Orthodox Christians. Jewish community groups, as a result, collectively purchased military barracks and hospitals that had previously been used to station Allied troops during the First World War: Campbell, sold to the Jewish community by the British Levantine businessman Robert Campbell, was one such area, and came to be occupied by some of the poorest Jews.

Greek refugees had been leaving the Ottoman Empire in large numbers since the beginning of the twentieth century, often settling within the Greek state. They were motivated both by informal local persecutions and by state-organised deportations. The former included an economic boycott on the island of Crete in 1910–1911, as well as attacks and forced expulsions by Turks returning to the Tekirdağ region of Eastern Thrace in the spring of 1914, shortly after the reoccupation of the region by the Ottoman Empire. The latter expulsions occurred with the approval and assistance of the Ottoman state, which employed punitive taxation and conscription policies, and similar pressures were placed upon Greek villages in western Anatolia in 1913 and 1914. The rate at which refugees arrived increased after the loss of Greece's territories in Ionia and Eastern Thrace in 1922, (Note: The Greek army withdrew from both regions in 1922; they were occupied by Turkey shortly after and formally ceded under the Treaty of Lausanne in August 1923.) creating widespread poverty in the Thessaloniki by the late 1920s in conjunction with a decline in the market for tobacco, one of its major industries . Greek authorities feared that the city was becoming a focus for communist agitation, and that Jewish groups were co-ordinating with communists from other communities against the state. In 1920, the Greek Ministry of Foreign Affairs translated the Protocols of the Elders of Zion, an antisemitic fabrication, into Greek, and published them in the Athenian newspaper Eleftheros Typos in 1925 in an effort to fight communism, alongside other articles by Ioannis Sofianopoulos in Eleftheron Vima relating his experiences of the Soviet Union.

Buildings in Campbell, June or July 1931

In the 1923 Greek legislative election, the Jews of Thessaloniki were assigned to a separate electoral constituency. The move was an attempt by the governing Liberal Party, led by Eleftherios Venizelos, to gerrymander a political bloc considered likely to vote against them, and exacerbated stereotypes of Jews as unpatriotic and as opposed to Greek national interests. The decision was hugely unpopular among the Jewish community, and many Jews boycotted the election in protest. Jews were seen as likely to support Royalist politics, while Christian refugees from Asia Minor generally supported the anti-monarchist Venizelists: Jewish voters had heavily backed the monarchy in the 1920 referendum on the return of Constantine I. Before the elections of 1928, Venizelos claimed that the separate constituency had been a temporary measure, intended to protect the Jews, and that it would be abolished. However, he announced after the election that the constituency would remain until, as he put it, the Jews of Thessaloniki considered themselves Greek citizens.

After the 1928 election, relations between the Liberals and the Jews of Thessaloniki improved: the Jewish League for Assimilation, which favoured the Liberal Party, was founded, and in December 1930, a Liberal candidate with strong Jewish support was elected as mayor of the city. However, during the same period, a Greek translation of the Protocols of the Elders of Zion was published by newspapers in the city, while the local newspaper Makedonia continued a campaign, begun in 1915, of antisemitic articles accusing the Jews of being a foreign population working to undermine the Greek nation. From 1928, it drew heavily upon the Protocols in its portrayal of Jews. Other Greek newspapers, such as Tachidromos, carried out antisemitic campaigns with the support of government agents. Although explicit antisemitism was not generally a feature of Venizelism at a national level, and indeed Venizelos had condemned in 1929 an antisemitic movement among senior military officers as "absolutely irregular", it nevertheless became a prominent feature of Venizelist and refugee politics in the north of Greece. Perceptions of Greek Jews as disloyal have been characterised by the historian Mark Levene as an undercurrent of Greek national politics of the period, particularly among Venizelists. In January 1930, Christian refugees from Asia Minor destroyed seventy graves in Thessaloniki's Jewish cemetery in protest at the cemetery's gates being closed, blocking their shortcut home from work.

== Preliminaries to the pogrom ==
=== Makedonia and the Sofia conference of 1930 ===
Although fascism in Greece never acquired the mass appeal that it did in other European countries, fascist organisations were active in northern Greece during the early 1930s. The most prominent of these was the National Union of Greece (EEE), founded in 1927 by merchant refugees from Asia Minor who saw Jews as their competition. By the 1930s, it had a reported membership of 7,000 nationally and 3,000 in Thessaloniki. Working closely with Makedonia, and with the tacit approval of the security forces, the EEE's activities included writing anti-Jewish graffiti and attacking cafes, bookstores and cinemas popular among leftists. In the summer of 1930, the Jews of Thessaloniki appealed to Stylianos Gonatas, the governor-general of Greek Macedonia, to ensure that Jews of non-Greek origin would be allowed to maintain official participation in civic life: Gonatas granted their request, sparking a series of antisemitic articles in Makedonia.

On 2 September 1930, Makedonia falsely reported that a Greek delegate, by the name of Arditti, at the conference of the Macedonian Youth Movement (being held in Sofia at the same time) had warned the Bulgarians of Macedonia that Jewish Macedonians, including those of Thessaloniki, would fight for the independence of their homeland. The newspaper called upon the Jewish sporting club Maccabi Thessaloniki to disavow the Bulgarian Maccabee movement. Meanwhile, the EEE and other nationalist organisations issued a joint statement, accusing Maccabi Thessaloniki of sympathising with the IMRO and calling upon Gonatas to dissolve it as an anti-Greek organisation. In response, the Jewish newspapers of Thessaloniki, including the French-language Indépendant, accused Makedonia of fabricating the accusations. In Athens, Eleftheron Vima suggested that the attendance of Thessalonikan Jews at the Sofia conference was evidence of their lack of loyalty to Greece.

=== Early conflicts in 1931 ===
In June 1931, the Jewish Maccabee Sports Association held a series of sporting events held in Sofia, the capital of Bulgaria, to commemorate its twenty-fifth anniversary. Maccabi Thessaloniki sent a delegation, including one Yitzhak Koen, which was seen by local Greek nationalists as a sign of the Jews' disloyalty towards Greece. The Maccabee event was roughly contemporary with a conference of Bulgarian Macedonians in Sofia, which passed a resolution for the independence of Macedonia from Greece and Bulgaria. Makedonia accused Koen of having travelled to Sofia to attend the latter conference: in truth, he had either not attended it at all, or left before the resolution had been passed. Makedonia called again for the dissolution of the Maccabee movement: EEE issued an aggressively worded exhortation urging the Christians of Thessaloniki to boycott Jewish businesses, accusing Jews of collaborating with communists and Bulgarian revolutionaries. Small-scale violence broke out between EEE members and Jews who tried, unsuccessfully, to prevent the promulgation of the EEE document.

The Jewish press did not, this time, respond to the accusations against their community. Gonatas publicly denied that any Greek Jews had participated in the Macedonian conference, and issued a statement in Eleftheron Vima urging EEE and its allies to stop their anti-Jewish activities. On 20 June, a Jewish business in the suburb of Rege was looted, as was the office of the Jewish scout movement Hakoah, where rioters left the message "Jews, leave Thessaloniki". By 23 June, a common anti-Jewish front had formed between several nationalist organisations, including the National All-Student Union (EPE), the National Workers' Organisation, and the Pavlos Melas organisation, named for a Greek officer who fought for the incorporation of Macedonia into Greece. The front had also attracted reservists of the Hellenic Army.

=== Violence prior to 29 June ===
Portrait of the Jewish pedlar Leon Vidal, who was fatally wounded shortly before the pogrom, published by the Communist newspaper Rizospastis on 6 July 1931

On 24 June, the offices of Maccabi Thessaloniki were attacked by around 200 rioters: three members of the board were injured, and the building was vandalised. By the time the police arrived, almost an hour later, the perpetrators were gone. Jewish shopkeepers organised to close their businesses in protest. Gonatas received a delegation of Jews from Thessalonika, but gave them no promises as to the actions he would take concerning the situation. On 25 June, the EPE distributed thousands of leaflets throughout the city, casting the Jews as a malign influence on the nation. On the same day, following an appeal by leaders of the Jewish community in Thessaloniki to the local government of Macedonia, troops were sent into the city to protect Jewish areas and Maccabi Thessaloniki. At the same time, the Greek parliament, including the Venizelist government, denounced the attacks: Venizelos condemned them and labelled the accusations made against Maccabi Thessaloniki as slanderous. The historian Mark Mazower has stated that the government underestimated the danger of the situation, and did not provide adequate security against further antisemitic violence. Meanwhile, groups of nationalists painted identifying letters on the houses of Jewish residents, and many Jews received anonymous letters ordering them to leave the city.

On 25 June, the chief of police, surnamed Kalochristianakis, met delegates of the Jewish community, who urged him to post additional officers to Jewish neighbourhoods; he assured them that they had no need to be concerned. Gonatas, meanwhile, met with representatives of the EEE. On the same day, a group of around 200 rioters attacked a house owned by Shmuel Moshe in the "151" neighbourhood in Kato Toumba, an area in the east of the city set up by the Jewish community to house refugees from the 1917 fire. The rioters attempted unsuccessfully to burn down the neighbourhood; several residents were injured. The wounded included a Jewish pedlar, Leon Vidal, who died of his injuries at the city's Hirsch Hospital four days later. On 28 June, around 10pm, armed nationalists attacked the Jewish neighbourhood of Charilaou, but were forced back by armed Jewish locals, leaving both Jewish and Christian residents injured.

== Pogrom ==
Gonatas was on holiday away from the city on 29 June, a day when Makedonia ran the headline "Finish them [the Jews] Off!". The violence intensified that afternoon, including anti-Jewish attacks in the nearby city of Volos. In Thessaloniki, at around 21:30, a member of the EEE led a group armed with axes and revolvers to attack a café in the working-class area of Campbell, where around 220 Jewish families, refugees from the 1917 fire, lived. Many Jews, expecting such an attack, had barricaded themselves into their homes. The attackers were pushed back by police, but further clashes broke out between Jews and nationalist rioters around 22:00, in which a member of the Royal Hellenic Air Force was injured.

Hearing news of the airman's injuries, a group of around 250 nationalists and soldiers made a reprisal attack into Campbell, looting property and beating and raping the inhabitants. This grew into a group of around 2000 nationalists, largely from the refugee districts of Toumba and Kalamaria, who began setting Campbell on fire under the direction of EEE members. Most of the rioters were refugees from Asia Minor, often impoverished petty traders of similarly low economic status to Campbell's Jews. A Christian baker, Leonidas Pappas, was shot dead by the rioters after refusing to hide the petrol that was to be used to start the fires. They then used the petrol to start fires in four locations around Campbell, and set up barricades to deny the fire services access to the area. Police prevented Jewish residents from leaving their homes, and stopped a group of Jews from other neighbourhoods, who had come to assist, from entering Campbell.

Other attacks took place at 23:00 in the "Transvaal" settlement, where police intervened to disperse the crowds, and at 00:30 in the "Rezi Vardar" area, where Jews were attacked by soldiers of the Greek artillery corps. By 02:00, the violence had stopped: in addition to the death of Pappas, twenty Jews were injured, several had been raped, and fifty-four families in Campbell had been made homeless. (Note: Tremopoulos gives the total number of families made homeless, across all of the affected districts, as 210; the United States Holocaust Museum gives it as 500. Naar states the casualties as 3 dead (2 Jews and 1 Christian) and 50 families made homeless.) The total damage of the riots was estimated at two million drachmas. Seventeen Jews were detained during the riots, and later released.

== Aftermath ==
On 30 June, members of the Communist Party of Greece (KKE) and the Communist Organisation of Bolshevik-Leninists of Greece–Archeiomarxists (COMLEA) demonstrated against the EEE and in solidarity with the Jewish community. The KKE demonstration, at 19:30, was small, owing to a large police presence; the COMLEA demonstration, an hour later, was broken up by the Hellenic Gendarmerie. On the same day, a further bout of antisemitic slogans were graffitied on Jewish homes and businesses: the local authorities failed to act on orders from Athens to address the situation, and instead the government blocked the sending of newspapers and telegrams abroad, and censored letters leaving the city, so that news of the continuing crisis would not spread outside Greece.

Venizelos declared martial law, and sent in a battalion of the army to protect Jewish neighbourhoods in the city. Within a week, the state allocated 500,000 drachmas to reconstruct Campbell. (Note: 500,000 drachmas in 1931 was approximately equivalent to $6,450, or approximately equivalent to $136,551 in 2025.) Representatives of the Jewish community requested that Venizelos visit the city, though he did not do so. Although Venizelos condemned the pogrom and reiterated his earlier opposition to antisemitism, relations between the Venizelists and the Jews of Thessaloniki never recovered. The government's response was seen by the Jews as inadequate: members of the Hellenic Parliament refused to condemn the rioters, calling them instead "men filled with patriotism and nationalism", (Note: The phrase was uttered by Leonidas Iasonidis, a Liberal MP and supporter of the EEE.) while Gonatas praised their dedication to "national government" and the "established social order". Venizelist newspapers, meanwhile, denied the involvement of nationalist groups and instead blamed the pogrom on communists; several communist leaders were arrested after weapons were found in the Thessaloniki workers' club.

=== Trial of the EEE members ===
On 2 April 1932, eleven suspects were tried in the district court of the Macedonian city of Veria for their part in the pogrom. It had been decided that the trial should be held in a small city without a large Jewish population, and Veria was also a centre of the EEE's support. The defendants were Nikolaos Fardis, an EEE member and the editor-in-chief of Makedonia; the EEE leaders Dimitris Charitopoulos and Georgios Kosmidis; several Greek Christians charged with committing arson during the attack on Campbell; and the leaders of Maccabi Thessaloniki, who were accused of attempting to undermine Greece's territorial integrity. During the trial, Makedonia ran articles defending the EEE, falsely reporting the testimony given by the trial's witnesses, and criticising politicians who condemned the pogrom.

The trial lasted a total of seventeen days. None of the eleven jurors were of Jewish descent. The court blamed Makedonia for inciting the pogrom by spreading false statements, but acquitted Fardis of the charges against him, of inciting violence and spreading hate. The two EEE leaders were similarly acquitted on the same charges, while the accused arsonists were also acquitted on the grounds that their actions had been motivated by patriotism. The leaders of Maccabi Thessaloniki were also declared innocent of the charges against them.

Mazower has called the Campbell pogrom the EEE's "moment in the limelight". The organisation broke up due to internal conflicts in 1934, having performed poorly in the municipal elections of February in that year. It was ultimately banned under the 4th of August Regime, a quasi-fascist dictatorship established by Ioannis Metaxas in 1936. (Note: Unlike fascist movements elsewhere in Europe, Metaxas's regime did not have a racial and antisemitic foundation to its ideology.)

=== Effect on the Jewish community ===
The pogrom was the first major antisemitic attack ever to occur in Thessaloniki, which had previously been considered a safe city for Jews. The Jewish community paid for a militia brigade to be formed to protect the city's cemetery. Many Jews in Thessaloniki left Jewish-majority areas on the city's outskirts to move nearer the city centre, or to emigrate overseas. Some visited the consulates of foreign states, asking permission to fly their country's flag in the hope of receiving protection from them. Devora, a mutual aid organisation set up in 1920 by middle-class Jewish women, provided relief to the victims of the attack. The historian Devin E. Naar has suggested that memories of the students' involvement in the Campbell pogrom may have partly explained the lack of Jewish representation at the University of Thessaloniki: between 1932 and 1935, no Jews enrolled.

Under Law 5369, issued on 2 April 1932, the Greek government refused to grant any restitution to the Jewish community for the damages to their property, and annulled the mortgage previously owed by them to the state for the land on which Campbell was built. The neighbourhood was entirely abandoned, and was expropriated by the Greek government in 1935. In total, around 15,000–18,000 Jews emigrated from Thessaloniki to Palestine in the aftermath of the pogrom, (Note: Molho gives the figure as 10,000 between 1932 and 1934.) and a further 15,000 had moved to France by 1938. Later in 1931, representatives of Greek Jewish organisations joined rallies at the city's church of St Minas, calling for the union (enosis) of Cyprus and Greece. Naar has suggested that this nationalistic display may have been motivated by either or both of genuine patriotism and a desire to prevent further accusations of disloyalty. Under Metaxas, Zvi Koretz, an Ashkenazi Jew, was appointed chief rabbi of Thessaloniki: he presided over a period of improved relations between the city's Jews and the Greek state, and between Greek Jews and Orthodox Christians.

In the United States, leaders of the Sephardic Jewish community protested, and organised relief for the victims of the pogrom. The Sephardic Brotherhood of America, a representative group originally constituted of emigrants from Thessaloniki, petitioned Venizelos to punish those responsible. La Vara, an American Sephardic newspaper, condemned the 1932 acquittal of the EEE members, blaming Venizelos and calling him "a second Hitler". Initial reports of the scale of the pogrom in the Jewish-American press were exaggerated, claiming that ten Jews had been killed. The memory of these untrustworthy reports resurfaced when news of the Holocaust first reached the United States, as Sephardic Jews were initially uncertain whether these accounts were also exaggerated.

== See also ==
- History of the Jews in Greece
- History of the Jews in Thessaloniki

== Bibliography ==
- Akçam, Taner (2012). The Young Turks' Crime Against Humanity: The Armenian Genocide and Ethnic Cleansing in the Ottoman Empire. Princeton University Press. ISBN 978-0-691-15333-9.
- Aly, Götz (2008). Hitler's Beneficiaries: Plunder, Racial War, and the Nazi Welfare State. New York: Henry Holt & Co. ISBN 978-1-78478-636-6.
- Chandrinos, Iason; Droumpouki, Anna Maria (2018). "The German Occupation and the Holocaust in Greece: A Survey". In Antoniou, Giorgos; Moses, A. Dirk (eds.). The Holocaust in Greece. Cambridge University Press. pp. 15–35. doi:10.1017/9781108565776. ISBN 978-1-108-56577-6.
- Dordanas, Stratos N. (2018). "The Jewish Community of Thessaloniki and the Christian Collaborators: 'Those That Are Leaving and What They Are Leaving Behind'". In Moses, A. Dirk; Antoniou, Giorgos (eds.). The Holocaust in Greece. Cambridge University Press. pp. 208–227. doi:10.1017/9781108565776.011. ISBN 978-1-108-47467-2.
- Doxiadis, Evdoxios (2016). "A Place in the Nation: Jews and the Greek State in the Long 19th Century". In Catalan, Tullia; Drogo, Marco (eds.). The Jews and the Nation-States of Southeastern Europe from the 19th Century to the Great Depression: Combining Viewpoints on a Controversial Story. Newcastle-upon-Tyne: Cambridge Scholars Publishing. pp. 104–134. ISBN 978-1-4438-9662-7.
- Fleming, Katherine Elizabeth (2010). Greece: A Jewish History. Princeton University Press. ISBN 978-0-691-14612-6.
- Frezis, Rafail (1999). Ο εβραϊκός τύπος στην Ελλάδα [The Jewish Press in Greece]. Volos: Israelite Association of Volos. ISBN 978-960-515-016-7.
- Hesse, Carla; Laqueur, Thomas W. (2018). "Bodies Visible and Invisible: The Erasure of the Jewish Cemetery in the Life of Modern Thessaloniki". In Antoniou, Giorgos; Moses, A. Dirk (eds.). The Holocaust in Greece. Cambridge University Press. pp. 327–358. doi:10.1017/9781108565776. ISBN 978-1-108-56577-6.
- Kazamias, George (2021). "Asia Minor Campaign and Disaster 1919–1922". In Speake, Graham (ed.). Encyclopedia of Greece and the Hellenic Tradition. New York: Taylor and Francis. pp. 180–183. ISBN 978-1-135-94206-9.
- Kerem, Yitzchak (2009). "Population Transfer of the Jews of Thessaloniki". In Ehrlich, M. Avrum (ed.). Encyclopedia of the Jewish Diaspora: Origins, Experiences, and Culture. Vol. 1. New York: ABC-CLIO. pp. 364–368. ISBN 978-1-85109-874-3.
- Lagos, Katerina (2023). The Fourth of August Regime and Greek Jewry, 1936–1941. Cham: Springer. ISBN 978-3-031-20533-0.
- Levene, Mark (2018). "'The Bulgarians Were the Worst!' Reconsidering the Holocaust in Salonika within a Regional History of Mass Violence". In Antoniou, Giorgos; Moses, A. Dirk (eds.). The Holocaust in Greece. Cambridge University Press. pp. 36–57. doi:10.1017/9781108565776. ISBN 978-1-108-56577-6.
- Margaritis, Georgios (2005). Ανεπιθύμητοι συμπατριώτες: Στοιχεία για την καταστροφή των μειονοτήτων της Ελλάδας [Unwanted Compatriots: Evidence for the Destruction of Greece's Minorities] (in Greek). Athens: Bibliorama. ISBN 960-8087-43-0.
- Mavrogordatos, George (1983). Stillborn Republic: Social Coalitions and Party Strategies in Greece, 1922–1936. Berkeley: University of California Press. ISBN 978-0-520-04358-9.
- Mazower, Mark (2005) [2004]. Salonica: City of Ghosts. New York: Alfred A. Knopf. ISBN 978-0-00-712022-2.
- Molho, Rena (2003). "Les Juifs en Grèce au XXe siècle" [The Jews in Greece in the 20th Century] (PDF). Matériaux pour l'histoire de notre temps (in French). 71: 39–48. doi:10.3406/mat.2003.919.
- Naar, Devin E. (2016). Jewish Salonica: Between the Ottoman Empire and Modern Greece. Stanford University Press. ISBN 978-0-8047-9887-7.
- Naar, Devin E. (2018). "'You are Your Brother's Keeper': Rebuilding the Jewish Community of Salonica from Afar". In Antoniou, Giorgos; Moses, A. Dirk (eds.). The Holocaust in Greece. Cambridge University Press. pp. 272–303. doi:10.1017/9781108565776. ISBN 978-1-108-56577-6.
- Ozil, Ayşe (2020). "In the Towns of Western Anatolia at the Time of the Great War: Greek Responses to the Ottoman Boycott and the Forced Population Movement". In Beşikçi, Mehmet; Somel, Selçuk Akşin; Toumarkine, Alexandre (eds.). Not All Quiet on the Ottoman Fronts: Neglected Perspectives on a Global War, 1914–1918. Istanbuler Texte und Studien. Vol. 44. Baden-Baden: Orient-Institut Istanbul. pp. 103–118. ISBN 978-3-95650-777-9 – via Academia.edu.
- Rozen, Minna (2005). "Jews and Greeks Remember Their Past: The Political Career of Tzevi Koretz (1933–43)". Jewish Social Studies. 12 (1): 111–166. doi:10.1353/jss.2006.0007. ISSN 0021-6704.
- Stavroulakis, Nicholas (1993). Salonica: Jews and Dervishes. New York: Talos Press. ISBN 978-960-7459-02-2.
- Tremopoulos, Michalis (2018). Τα τρία Ε (ΕΕΕ) και ο εμπρησμός του Κάμπελ: Το πογκρόμ του 1931 στη Θεσσαλονίκη [The Three Es (EEE) and the Campbell Arson: The Pogrom of 1931 in Thessaloniki] (in Greek). Thessaloniki: Antigone. ISBN 978-618-82604-4-3.
