= Moses Elisaf =

Greek physician, academic, and politician (1954–2023)

Moisis Elisaf
- Μωυσής Ελισάφ
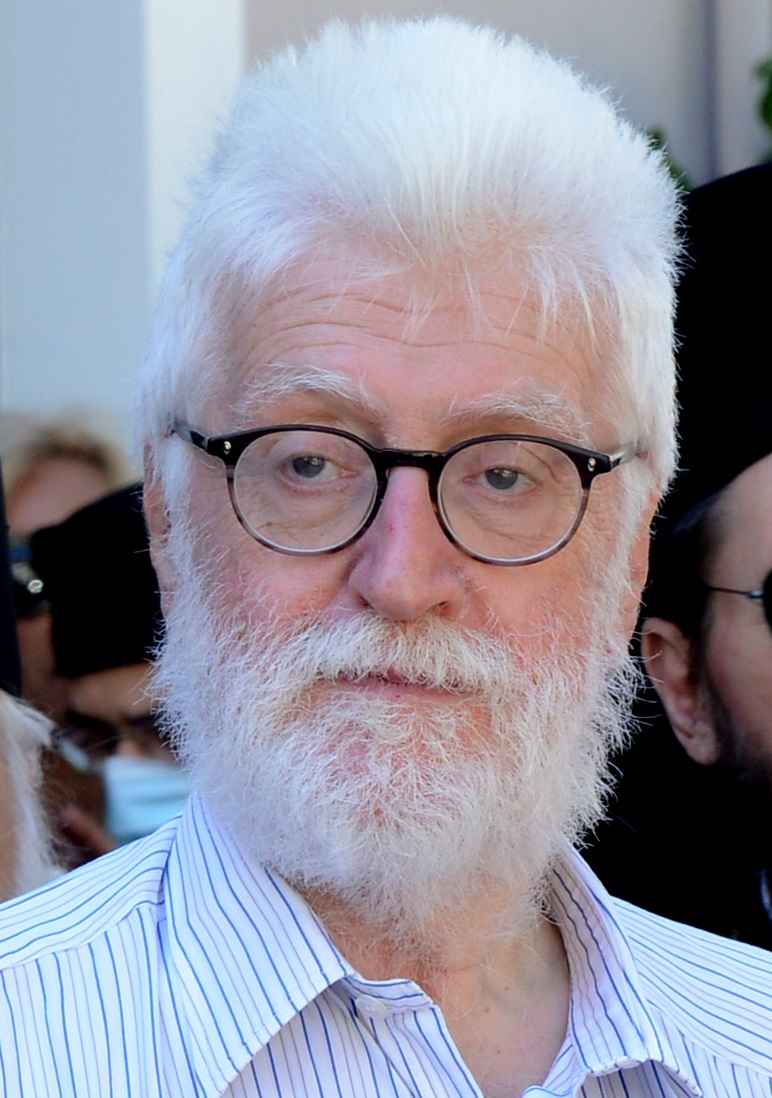
- Elisaf in 2021

Mayor of Ioannina
- In office 1 September 2019 – 17 February 2023
- Preceded by: Thomas Begas
- Succeeded by: Dimitris Papageorgiou

Personal details
- Born: 17 July 1954 Ioannina, Greece
- Died: 17 February 2023 (aged 68) Ioannina, Greece
- Party: Independent
- Education: University of Athens
- Occupation: Physician, academic, politician
- Website: elisaf.gr

Moisis Elisaf (Greek: Μωυσής Ελισάφ; 17 July 1954 – 17 February 2023) was a Greek physician, academic, and politician. He served as mayor of Ioannina from September 2019 until his death in February 2023. He was Greece's first Jewish mayor.

== Early life ==
Elisaf was born in Ioannina on 17 July 1954, the son of Romaniote Jews and Holocaust survivors who had escaped the Nazi roundup which saw all but 9% of Ioannina's Jewish population deported by Nazi German troops to the Auschwitz concentration camp. After the liberation of Greece in 1944, survivors suffered discrimination for their involvement in communist resistance groups such as the Greek People's Liberation Army. Elisaf graduated from the University of Athens in 1979.

== Career ==
Elisaf was a physician and professor of internal medicine at Ioannina Medical School. He was the director of the school's Lipids, Atherosclerosis, Obesity, and Diabetes Department. Between 1993 and 1994, he worked at the Sackler Faculty of Medicine at Tel Aviv University. Several of his relatives live in Israel. He was the president of the Romaniote Jewish community of Ioannina for more than a decade and had previously served as the president of the Central Board of Jewish Communities in Greece. Elisaf also served on the city council and as the president of a cultural center.

Running as an independent, Elisaf obtained 50.3% of the vote during the second round of elections for mayor of Ioannina in June 2019, winning the election with 17,789 votes, 235 more than his runoff opponent. He took office in September, becoming the first Jewish mayor in the history of Greece. He said that he was a centrist who aimed to build consensus around policies for the city's development, such as improving infrastructure and public services. During his campaign, political opponents falsely claimed that he was a Mossad agent. He called the claims antisemitic but reaffirmed his belief that antisemitism in Greece is not a serious issue.

== Personal life and death ==
Like most of the few Jews in Ioannina and Greece, Elisaf was a secular Jew. He died from cancer on 17 February 2023 during his term as mayor.
