= Rescue of the Jews of Zakynthos =

In Greece during World War II

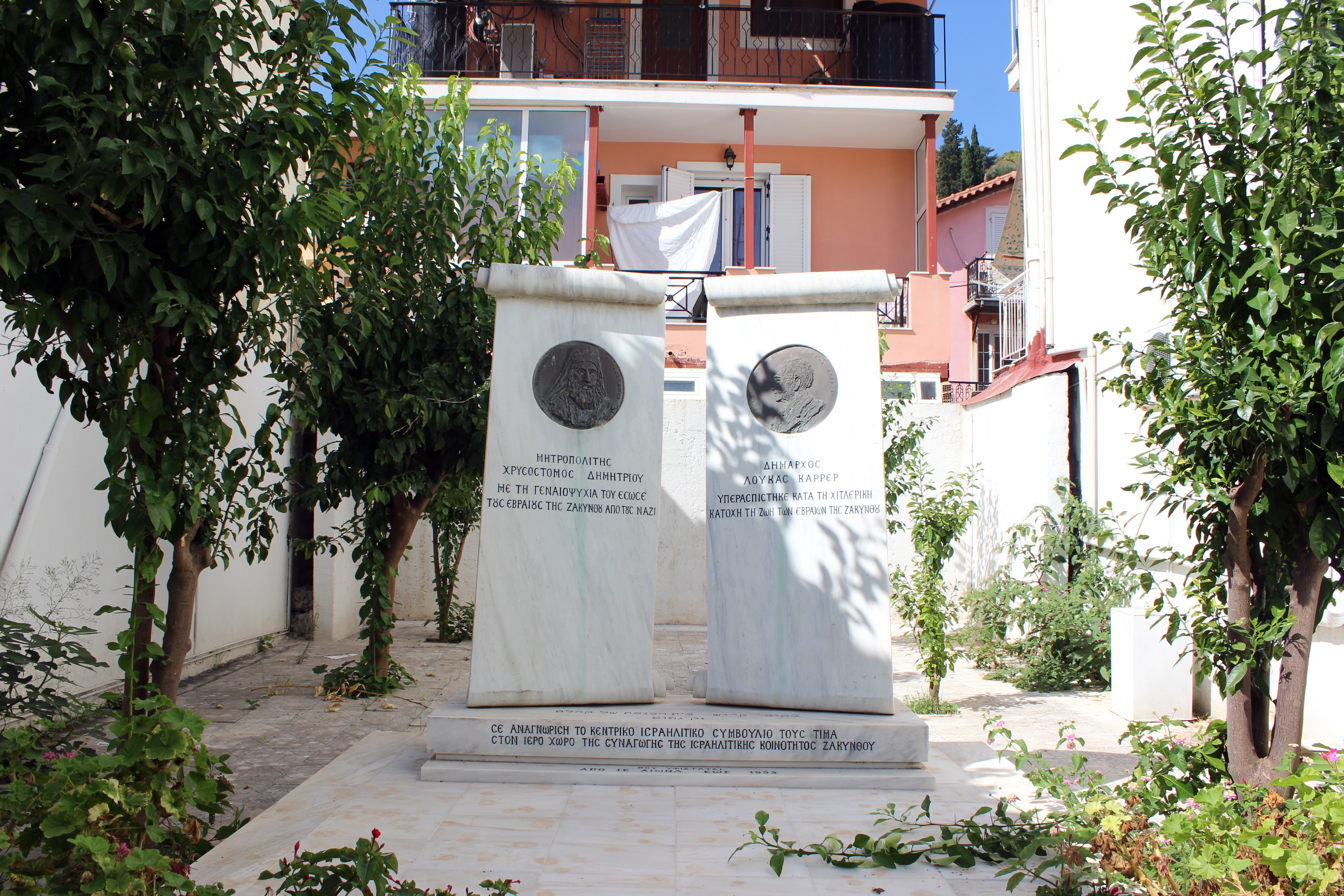
Memorial to Bishop Chrysostomos and Loukas Karrer at the site of the Zakynthos synagogue destroyed in the 1953 Ionian earthquake.

During the Holocaust in Greece, the entire community of Jews of Zakynthos, numbering 275 people, was not deported after Mayor Loukas Karrer and Bishop Chrysostomos (1890–1958) refused Nazi orders to turn in a list of the town's Jewish community for deportation to the death camps. Instead they secretly hid the town's Jews in various rural villages and turned in a list that included only their own two names. The entire Jewish population survived the war. The Jewish community of Zakynthos was the only Jewish community under German occupation in Europe to not have been deported or annihilated through local measures.

Statues of the Bishop and the Mayor commemorate their heroism on the site of the town's historic synagogue, destroyed in the earthquake of 1953. In 1978, Yad Vashem, the Holocaust Martyrs' and Heroes' Remembrance Authority in Israel, honored Bishop Chrysostomos and Mayor Karrer with the title of "Righteous Among the Nations", an honor given to non-Jews who, at personal risk, saved Jews during the Holocaust. After the war, all of the Jews of Zakynthos moved either to Israel or to Athens.

== Background ==
On 9 September 1943, six days after Italy's surrender, the Germans took possession of the island. Unlike the Jewish communities in larger population centers, such as Salonika, Athens, and Corfu, the German round-up orders on Zakynthos were informal, rather than by means of public decrees. German-appointed mayor Loukas Karrer was responsible for finding 200 daily workers of the Germans' needs, namely building fortifications or working at the artillery base at Kalamaki, with the Jewish community given a 5-person quota based on their percentage of the population. After learning that the Germans would torture laborers who were found to be Jewish, Karrer replaced the Jewish workers with Christians in return for monetary re-compensation for daily substitutions.

== Rescue of Jews of Zakynthos ==
The military governor of Zakynthos, Alfred Lüth, demanded that Karrer provide a list of the Jews of the island under pain of death. Karrer consulted with Bishop Chrysostomos, and burned the list of Jews under the bishop's advice. Chrysostomos also facilitated a meeting between Karrer, Lüth, and the president of the Jewish community, Moshe Gani; he instructed Gani to come to the meeting dressed in rags to give Lüth the impression that the Jews of Zakynthos were impoverished and no threat to the Germans. Karrer and Chrysostomos also bribed Lüth with a diamond ring to avoid turning over the lists. They explained to Lüth that most of the Jews had left Zakynthos due to the bombings and the war, and that amassing the Zakynthos Jews would be futile. After repeated demands from the Germans for list of the Jews, Karrer and Chrysostomos submitted a list with only their two names.
