= Naar =

Naar may refer to:

- Devin E. Naar
- Naar, the god of darkness in the Lone Wolf book series
- Naar (Encantadia)
- The concept of Hell in Islam, see Jahannam
