= Alfred Lüth =

- Disappeared: 1944; Zakynthos
- Cause of death: possibly summarily executed
- Allegiance: Nazi Germany
- Rank: Captain
- Known for: Possibly helping save the Jews of Zakynthos

Alfred Lüth (?-1944), also known as Lit or von Lüth, was a captain in the Wehrmacht who served as the governor of the Greek island of Zakynthos during World War II. He is particularly known for being the German governor during the rescue of the Jews of Zakynthos.

For reasons still not fully understood, he may have played a role in collaboration with Bishop Chrysostomos Dimitriou and Mayor Loukas Karrer in saving the entire Jewish population of Zakynthos. Shortly before the withdrawal of German troops from the island, he was replaced by another governor, arrested, possibly for saving the Jews, and subsequently vanished from sources, potentially executed summarily.

== Biography ==
According to some sources, Alfred Lüth is believed to be Austrian, but the Austrian archives do not provide confirmation of this.

The Germans took control of Zakynthos after the surrender of Italy in September 1943, and Lüth was appointed as the military governor at that time. He held the rank of captain in the Wehrmacht. Arriving on the island from Athens on September 9, 1943, under the command of the LXVIII Army Corps and General of the Fliers Hellmuth Felmy. This army corps is known for its mass participation in the Holocaust, especially during their occupation of Greece.

While serving as governor, he had new stamps created featuring King Victor Emmanuel III of Italy. It is suggested that his regiment was sent to the island as a form of punishment, possibly straining his relations with the Nazi command from the outset.

Alfred Lüth is primarily known for his actions during the rescue of the Jews of Zakynthos. In this episode, after threatening the civilian authorities of the island, Bishop Chrysostomos Dimitriou, and Mayor Loukas Karrer with execution if they did not provide him with the list of Jews on the island, he reportedly refrained from carrying out the threat in the face of their categorical refusal. Lüth is said to have received at least one diamond from Chrysostomos Dimitriou to prevent the deportation of Jews. His behavior is particularly challenging to analyze, as he was willing to force Karrer at gunpoint to reveal the names and addresses of the Jews on the island, but at other times, he allegedly told the leader of the Jewish community on the island, Yaakov Mordo, that "as long as I live, the Jews of Zakynthos will not be taken". He played a crucial role in avoiding the deportation to Auschwitz for over 200 Jews by delaying deportation orders, allowing them to hide in the mountains. Alfred Lüth also employed various rhetorical strategies with Nazi authorities to prevent deportation, asserting that deporting Jews would lead to an uprising by the Greek population, mayors would cease to obey, and the bishop would call for rebellion.

A few days before the end of the occupation and the withdrawal of the Nazi troops, a new governor was appointed to replace Lüth. For reasons difficult to understand, possibly linked to the fact that he may have saved Jews, although not certain, he was arrested by this new governor. Alfred Lüth then disappears from sources, and it is conceivable that he was summarily executed at that time.

== Analysis ==
It appears that the situation on the island was an exception, as Lit did not register the Jews, unlike on other occupied Greek islands. According to Greek historian Anna Maria Droumpouki, his "silent assistance" is "certainly" one of the reasons for the rescue of all the Jews on the island. Some historians support the idea that Lüth directly saved the Jews, notably by warning them of the looming threat. However, according to other historians, he might not have assisted the Jews and could have implemented the typical measures of the Third Reich, such as red posters on the walls of Zakynthos, prohibiting the locking of doors, requiring the names of residents to be written on the doors of the island's ghetto, threatening to shoot any Greek hiding a Jew, and even ordering the arrival of boats for deportation.

In reality, for the latter, like Valentina Pisanty, it may possibly be Lüth's intention to avoid repercussions for the Holocaust. The possibility of a special war tribunal, similar to the future Nuremberg trials, was already a widely discussed topic at the end of 1943 and the beginning of 1944, as German troops planned the evacuation of Greece. This could have motivated Lüth to refrain from deporting the island's community to avoid legal consequences. For Hagen Fleischer, however, although Lüth supported and protected the Jews, partly due to conflicts with the Nazi regime, one of the reasons explaining the rescue of the Jews in Zakynthos is also the fact that the boats intended for deportation in the Ionian Islands quickly became overloaded with deportees from the nearby island of Corfu and could no longer embark Jews in Zakynthos.

His role is still poorly understood and fluctuates between significant protection of the Jewish population, according to some historians, or rather an unsuccessful attempt to deport the Jews or a desire to avoid prosecution, according to others.

== Legacy ==
=== Art ===
He is a character in the novel "Kein Mensch ist eine Insel" by Wilhelm Kuehs. The survivors of the Jewish community in Greece described him in the 1950 publication "In Memoriam" as follows:

"The island's commander, a good Austrian, avoided following the deportation order. He maneuvered, circumvented, found pretexts and excuses to delay the action, stating to his superiors that local authorities, the metropolitan bishop, the mayor, the prefect, the police commissioner, and the entire public opinion were against deportation. Lüth himself acted decisively against the deportation of Jews."
