= Kostis Kornetis =

American historian

Kostis Kornetis (born 1975) is a historian of twentieth-century Europe.

== Works ==
- Kornetis, Kostis (2013). Children of the Dictatorship: Student Resistance, Cultural Politics and the 'Long 1960s' in Greece. Berghahn Books. ISBN 978-1-78238-001-6.
