= Chrysostomos Dimitriou =

Orthodox Bishop and Righteous Among the Nations

- Χρυσόστομος Δημητρίου
- Born: 1889; Piraeus, Greece
- Died: 22 October 1958 (aged 68–69); Athens, Greece
- Occupation: Eastern Orthodox bishop
- Known for: Saving Jews on Zakynthos during the Holocaust

Chrysostomos Dimitriou (Greek: Χρυσόστομος Δημητρίου; 1889 – 22 October 1958 died age 69), also known by his episcopal names of Chrysostomos of Zakynthos or Chrysostomos of Trifylia and Olympia, was the Greek Orthodox bishop of the island of Zakynthos during World War II and the bishop of Trifylia and Olympia postwar until his death.

Together with mayor Loukas Karrer and at a lesser extent, Alfred Lüth, Dimitriou saved the Jews of the island from the Holocaust; for this they were awarded the title of Righteous Among the Nations.

== Biography ==
=== Before World War II ===
Chrysostomos Dimitriou was born in 1889 in the city of the Piraeus, the main port of Athens. He studied theology in the Theological School of Athens and was ordained as a deacon in July 1916 and then priest the 11 March 1917 by Theoklitos I of Athens. He then served as a preacher in the diocese of Demetrias and Thebes before being sent to study theology in Munich, Germany, where he learned German. While in Munich, he met a young Adolf Hitler and they exchanged about Nazism.

After his return to Greece, he was named Secretary of the Holy Synod of the Church of Greece before being ordained as the Metropolitan of Zakynthos. Since the beginning of his work in Zakynthos, he showed sympathy toward the Jews of the island and for that, was criticized by Orthodox fanatics. In 1935, he joined the Old Calendarists, but after being condemned by the Holy Synod, he issued public repentance and was admitted back as the legitimate Metropolitan of Zakynthos. During his episcopacy, he also got involved in the religious issues of his time. He was influential in one of the two religious chant movements in Greece at that time, particularly by supporting Ioannis Sakellaridis.

=== World War II ===
During the first part of the war, the island fell under Italian occupation. He made a commitment in favor of the prisoners of war to obtain their release. He was arrested by the authorities and exiled to Athens for a year before returning to his bishopric. On 9 September 1943, six days after Italy's surrender, the Germans took possession of the island. The Nazis began making plans to deport Jews from the island, who had survived the Holocaust so far. The administration of the island came under the control of Nazi occupation authorities, specifically the German Chief of Police, Baerens, and the Wehrmacht Colonel, Alfred Lüth.

They asked the metropolitan and mayor Loukas Karrer to give them a list of the Jews residing on the island to proceed to the deportation. Dimitriou asked Carrer to burn the list and went to the German governor, Lüth. He told him that the Jews on the island were "part of his flock" and that he could not give him the list, then, wrote his name on a piece of paper and said "Here is the list". In other exchanges with the governor, he reportedly stated that the Jews had "never bothered anyone", that they were "like other Greeks", and that it would "greatly offend the population of Zakynthos if they were to leave". Moreover, Chrysostomos Dimitriou would have bribed the governor with a diamond. According to Chrysostomos, the Jews were "spiritual brothers", even though they were not Orthodox.

After warning the Jewish community, he promised them that the Greek islanders would protect them, and despite attempts by the Germans to proceed with the deportation, the Jewish community of Zakynthos managed to escape the deportation and the Holocaust. This was made possible by the assistance provided by the mountain villages, which could then hide the Jews. According to historians, the entire population of 275 Jews on the island was saved by this method. Furthermore, his family also got involved in the resistance, such as his sister, Vassiliki Stravolemos, who also spoke German. This allowed her to arrange for the medical treatment of sick Jews directly in the German hospital with the help of complicit German doctors.

He then reportedly sent a telegram to Adolf Hitler declaring that the Jews of the island were under his authority. This telegram was viewed by those close to him, but it was lost due to an earthquake, making its authenticity difficult to confirm or deny. Dimitriou said he had followed the orders of the Archbishop of Athens, Damaskinos, who declared : "I have taken up my cross. I spoke to the Lord, and made up my mind to save as many Jewish souls as possible."

According to a widespread legend within the Jewish and Orthodox community of Zakynthos, he would have personally prevented the departure of a convoy of around sixty deportees by going in front of the supposed ship to take them away. However, this is a legend, as the Jews were never actually captured and arrested on the island; they were hidden in the mountains.

=== After World War II ===
After the war, the Jewish community financed the stained glass windows of the Saint Dionysios Church in Zakynthos in his honor. He was then transferred, shortly before his death, to the Metropolis of Trifylia and Olympia, before dying in Athens on 22 October 1958.

== Legacy ==
=== Historical ===
On 7 November 1978, he was awarded the title of Righteous Among the Nations, along with Loukas Carrer, for his actions to protect Jews from the Holocaust. He is considered to be one of the seminal examples of the Greek resistance and the Greek fight against the Holocaust.

=== Artistical ===
He is a character in Anne Michaels' Fugitive Pieces, where he emerges to rescue the Jewish community of the island. In a passage from Arnold Zable's Fig Tree, the author connected Chrysostomos Dimitriou with the Greek concept of philoxenia.
