= Antisemitism in Greece =

Antisemitism in Greece manifests itself in religious, political and media discourse. The 2009–2018 Greek government-debt crisis has facilitated the rise of far right groups in Greece, most notably the formerly obscure Golden Dawn.

Jews have lived in Greece since antiquity, but the largest community of around 20,000 Sephardic Jews settled in Thessalonica after an invitation from the Ottoman Sultan in the 15th century. After Thessalonica was annexed to Greece in 1913, the Greek government recognized Jews as Greek citizens with full rights and attributed Judaism the status of a recognized and protected religion. During the Holocaust in Greece, there were both rescue attempts and collaborationism with the Nazi authorities. More than 80% of Greek Jews were murdered. Currently in Greece, Jewish communities representing the 5,000 Greek Jews are legal entities under public law. They come under the jurisdiction of the Ministry of Education and Religious Affairs, according to Law No. 2456–1920 "On Jewish Communities".

== History of antisemitism in modern Greece ==
=== Religious antisemitism ===
As of 2005, there were around 5,000 Jews in Greece out of a population of 10.5 million.

In 2000, the Greek government was obliged by the EU to remove the reference to "religion" from national identity cards. Leaders of the Orthodox Church protested, saying the government was "bowing to Jewish pressure". The Archbishop (of Athens and All Greece) Christodoulos waged a campaign against the reforms and mobilized thousands of Greek citizens in mass protest rallies in Athens and Thessaloniki. These were followed by a series of antisemitic attacks motivated by notions of a "Jewish plot", including the extensive desecration of Jewish cemeteries and the Athens synagogue, and the defacement of Jewish monuments and private properties with slogans as swastikas.

=== Antisemitism in Corfu Island ===
Prior to becoming a part of Greece, the Jews of Corfu were mistreated and lived under poor and pitiful conditions. The adverse attitude of Christians on the island against Jews was overt and continuing. The confliction and tension between the Orthodox Christians and the Jews on the island only got more grave as the time went by. Because of religious reasons, the community of Corfu island constantly submitted petitions to the Venetian authorities regarding the spatial restriction of the Jews, which resulted with a statute which limited the abandonment of their district without a written permission. An Occident and American Jewish Advocate report from 1845 describes the situation: “The Greeks hate them, and seize every opportunity for injuring and ill-treating them; so that their situation would be very pitiable, if the English did not take them under their protection. Twenty years ago no Jew dared show himself in the streets during the holy week; but things have changed since that time.”

With the Corfu and other Ionian islands being joined to the mainland of Greece, the Jews were given equal rights with the others on the island in accordance with the Greek Constitution. According to the newspaper Estia, “their social position as citizens did not improve at all” in the following thirty years. Many Orthodox Christians rejected to go to the electoral centers since the Jews had earned the right to vote.

==== An antisemitic blood libel case ====
The antisemitic incident of blood libel took place on the island of Corfu upon the finding of a girl's dead body in a Jewish residence on 1 April 1891. Her name was Rubina, the daughter of Vita Sarda and Loukia Eliezer, and she was 8 years old. The incident made way for the expulsion of the Corfu's Jews from the island that they lived for centuries.

After the parents reporting the disappearance of their daughter to the police and the related news becoming public via Kangas, whole island became aware of the incident and whole Jewish community began their search for the girl. Kefalas reports that Vita Sarda in the entryway of a Jewish house. Without any evidence, the police said “the Jews had murdered the youngster, that they had caught the murderers red handed, that they had delivered them to the investigating (judicial) authorities but that these authorities turning a blind eye had set them free”, accusing the whole Jewish community of murder.

Following the accusations, Vita Sarda and her son, Solomon, were arrested and interrogated.

A medical report claimed that “in the body of Rubina there was not a drop of blood”. Meanwhile, the prosecutor Kefalas reported:

From that moment on, those who had the most to gain by stirring the whole city against the Jewish element, shouted that the murdered girl was Christian, that her blood was drawn by the Jews, to be used for their Mazot, without which they could not celebrate Easter, that the judges and prosecutors and all military authorities were bribed to take care of the Jews, setting the murderers free for the sake of future elections.

With the rapid spread of the groundless news, Christian population of the city turned against the Jews despite the fact that the medical report was later proven to be incorrect. Moreover, the citizens gathered in groups began arriving in the Jewish district and then wounded and beat the Jews. Outside the Jewish district, in the event of other Christians confronting the Jews, they threatened and hit the Jews. Becoming desperate and hopeless, they were obliged to leave their homeland.

Excluded by the Christians, many Jews compelled to leave the island were in search of safe places to settle on. Meanwhile, on the island, many Jewish properties got damaged by Christians. The propaganda against Jews spread not only through the island but also to Athenian newspapers. Attacks on the remaining Jewish residents continued.

Some of the Jews who were forced to leave the island fled to Istanbul. An Ottoman document communicates the arrival of sixty five Jews:

"A population of sixty five Jews, who fled (Corfu Island) by leaving their goods and properties behind in order to save their lives just after the brawl with the Greeks due to a murdered girl on the last Passover on the island of Corfu have arrived out of fear to Istanbul without passports today, by the ship named “Floro” of the Italian company, and as according to their taken statements some eight thousand Jews apart from themselves saved their lives with fleeing to Alexandria and other places because of their (Greeks’) attacks and tyranny, it is understood that many more Jews will come to Istanbul, and as officers are sent to do the needed by regarding them (Jews) suitable to be linked to solid guarantee by being delivered to Rabbi House due to the fact that they have no passports, permission is requested for the procedure to be adopted about them." 18 May 1891

Another Ottoman document informs about another eleven Jews arriving in Istanbul:

"From the Corfu people and the Jewish nation, a population of eleven more, men and women, have today arrived in Istanbul and it is informed that they have been delivered similarly to Rabbi House…" 27 May 1891.

== Current situation ==
In recent years there has been great improvement in Greece-Israel relations, particularly following the disintegration of Israel–Turkey relations after the Gaza flotilla raid. In August 2010, Benjamin Netanyahu became the first Israeli Prime Minister to visit Greece. On his two-day tour, the Prime Minister discussed with the Greek Prime Minister George Papandreou the possibility of expanding strategic ties and establishing greater cooperation between the nations' militaries and related industries. It is yet to be seen what affect this geopolitical change will have on Antisemitism in Greece. While Greek Jews today largely "live side by side in harmony" with Christian Greeks, according to Giorgo Romaio, president of the Greek Committee for the Jewish Museum of Greece, there has recently been an increased effort to work with other Greeks, and Jews worldwide, to combat any rise of antisemitism in Greece.

The Greek government debt crisis, which started in 2009, saw an increase in extremism of all kinds, including some cases of antisemitic vandalism. In 2010, the front of the Jewish Museum of Greece was defaced, for the first time ever. In 2010 the old Etz Hayyim Synagogue in Hania, one of the most noted Jewish temples in Greece, was set alight twice and 2500 rare books and manuscripts were destroyed. In 2011 arsonists attacked Corfu synagogue at the start of the Jewish Passover holiday. On Rhodes, on 26 October 2012, vandals spray-painted the city's Holocaust monument with swastikas. Partly to head off any new-found threat from extremism, thousands of Jewish and non-Jewish Greeks attended Thessaloniki's Holocaust Commemoration in March 2013. The meeting was personally addressed by Greece's prime minister, Antonis Samaras, who delivered a speech to Monastir Synagogue (Thessaloniki).

On February 7, 2014, Theodoros Karypidis, a local candidate for the Syriza political party for governor of the Western Macedonia region, remarked on his Facebook page that Prime Minister Antonis Samaras was "lighting the candles in the seven branched candelabra of the Jews and lighting Greece on fire... He is organizing a new Hanukkah against the Greeks" when Samaras paid a visit to the synagogue in Thessaloniki as part of a commemoration of the destruction of the Greek Jewish community by the Nazis during the Second World War. A Samaras spokesman described the comments as "unacceptable, racist and anti-Semitic", and Tsipras's party called a special meeting to address the issue. Syriza later dropped the candidate following criticism domestically within Greece and elsewhere, a move welcomed by the Greek Jewish community.

In late 2014 Panos Kammenos, founder of the right-wing party Independent Greeks party, was recorded during a television interview making the antisemitic claim that "Jews don't pay taxes".

In March 2015, a survey about the Greeks' perceptions of the holocaust was published. Its findings showed that less than 60 percent of the respondents think that holocaust teaching should be included in the curriculum. Giorgos Antoniou, a historian at the International Hellenic University, commented to the article and said that "the Holocaust is not really treated as an issue of national concern”.

In April 2015, Dimitris Kammenos, an MP for the right-wing Independent Greeks party, responded on a Tweet by Russian news-site RT about antisemitism in Europe with the question: "Have you recorded the attacks of Jews against all of us?". Two months later antisemitic graffiti was found in Athens and in Kavala. with the incidents involving desecration of Holocaust memorials. Critical as before with the comments of Panos Kammenos on the topic, the Greek Syriza party came out strongly against such sentiment, with Tsipras going on to ask Kammenos to resign.

A few members of the ruling New Democracy (Greece) party have been criticised for their antiseminitism, among them high-ranking ministers: Adonis Georgiadis, currently vice-president of New Democracy, has been accused of 'promoting antisemitism', and has in the past promoted self-proclaimed Nazi Konstantinos Plevris's book "Jews, the whole truth", an antisemitic screed that calls for the extermination of Jews and impugns Adolf Hitler for not "finishing his work". Plevris' son, Thanos Plevris, is a Minister of Health in Kyriakos' Mitsotakis cabinet. Makis Voridis, currently Minister for Rural Development and Food, was a member and leader of the National Political Union (1984), a far-right political party, whose previous leader included Nikolaos Michaloliakos, Golden-Dawn's future leader. He has been accused of having 'a long history of Holocaust denial, antisemitism and xenophobia, including physical threats to Jewish families and leading groups of thugs against immigrants and leftists' and the Foreign Ministry in Jerusalem expressed concern about his appointment, citing his racist and antisemitic positions.

The ADL (Anti-Defamation League) published on 2015 the "ADL Global 100", a report of the status of antisemitism in 100 countries around the world. The report found that 69% of the adult population in Greece harbor some form of antisemitic attitude, of various levels of seriousness. The research found out that 38% of the population agree with the statement "Jews are responsible for most of the world's wars", and 85% think that "Jews have too much power in the business world". However, this survey has been criticized by journalist Jesse Singal as being unreasonably simplistic in its classification of "harboring antisemitic attitudes. Norman Finkelstein also criticized it, saying "I would find it alarming if anyone except [Anti-Defamation League National Director] Abe Foxman (and perhaps the New York Times editorial board) took this survey seriously. Fortunately, most every sane person has come to take anything the Anti-Defamation League (ADL) utters with a dozen boulders of salt".

In January 2023, The Times of Israel reported that the Thessaloniki Holocaust memorial was defaced with swastikas and fascist symbols twice in 'weeks.'

=== Sacrilege ===
Away from any instances of antisemitism in politics, there have been instances of Jewish cemeteries being desecrated during the period of economic crisis (Kos, July 19, 2013; Thessaloniki, October 30, 2011; and Kavala, June 13, 2010). During 2011 a synagogue and a Holocaust memorial were also sprayed with antisemitic graffiti. Towards the end of June 2014, a threatening graffito was found on the Athens Holocaust memorial. The graffito said, "Paragraph X-2 of hilkoth akum in the Talmud states, it is proper to kill Jews who have been baptized...Otherwise we shall destroy the synagogue for you". Two more antisemitic graffiti were scrawled towards the end of 2014. In Thessaloniki a monument dedicated to the old Jewish cemetery was covered with anti-Israeli messages, and in Larissa the Jewish cemetery was desecrated with antisemitic slogans.

Coming to 2020s, another series of sacrilegious events on Jewish cemeteries have taken place in Ioannina. First was the desecration of a tomb in the Jewish Cemetery of Ioannina on August 5, 2021, in which different parts of the tomb were damaged. After being found that the upper tombstone was left removed, it was seen that marbles fragments also suffered vandalisation. Another antisemitic event in the same cemetery occurred on September 10, 2021, just a month after the earlier event. The tomb damaged in a similar way was attacked during the High Holidays of the Jewish.

=== The rise of the "far right" ===
Golden Dawn (Chrysi Avyi) was a fringe movement when founded in the early 1980s and remained so until 2009. In the 2009 elections, it garnered a meager 0.23 percent of the vote. In 2010, it won a seat on the Athens City Council and in the June 2012 election it received 6.92 percent of the national vote - thus becoming the fifth largest party currently in the parliament. According to an October poll (in 2012), if elections were held then, Golden Dawn would gain no less than 14 percent of the vote, making it Greece's third-largest party. Greek Prime Minister Antonis Samaras described Golden Dawn as "a right-wing extremist, one might say Fascist, neo-Nazi party". With its violence against immigrants, swastika-like emblem and Nazi salute, its aggressive rallies, and unabashed references to Mein Kampf, as well as its propagation of literature touting the racial superiority of the Greeks, promoting Aryan supremacy, racist and antisemitic ideology, and Holocaust denial. Nevertheless, Golden Dawn does not regard itself as a Nazi or even neo-Nazi party (although photographs published on August 8, 2013, revealed a swastika's tattoo on Elias Kasidiàris shoulder ), but simply as a nationalist formation, the members of which seek to rescue Greece for the Greeks - with its nationalist rhetoric, the party appeals to Greek pride. On June 17, 2012, eighteen members of Golden Dawn were sworn into the Boule ton Ellenon (Greek parliament). In so doing, it has arguably become the most extreme right-wing political party to have won parliamentary seats in Europe in recent years. In 2002, marked by a wave of antisemitic manifestations, the most disturbing was the electoral success of George Karatzaferis, the leader of the ultra-nationalist LAOS party. Karatzaferis was one of the most outspoken promoter of antisemitism in Greek public life, and often used his television channel, TeleAsty, which was granted an official license, to voice antisemitic, racist and nationalist propaganda. He also owned the weekly newspaper Alpha Ena, both of which, along with the LAOS party, were singled out as the major disseminators of the September 11th libel in Greece.

In January 2014, thousands of pictures and videos were found at one of the Golden Dawn MP's. They carried antisemitic rhetoric and included photos of party members performing the Nazi salute or violent acts. Earlier, in May 2013, a Golden Dawn MP was ejected from Parliament chamber after few "Hail Hitler" calls were heard.

On March 2, 2014, a doctor who is a member of the Golden Dawn party, had put a plaque outside his office which said, in German, "Jews Not Welcome". A search by authorities retrieved 12 knives and three daggers, two inscribed with Nazi symbols, and he was arrested.

=== The Eastern Orthodox Church ===
The Eastern Orthodox Church has yet to officially absolve the Jews for the death of Christ. Holy Thursday and Good Friday liturgies still contain verses in which collective guilt for the death of Jesus is ascribed to the Jews.

Antisemitism is also retained in popular Easter customs. According to Professor Frangiski Abatzopoulou of the University of Thessaloniki, the Burning of Judas Iscariot (the Holy Thursday custom of the "Kapsimo tou Youda") is the "most familiar and widespread manifestation of traditional anti-Semitism in Greece". She notes that "the accusation [against the Jews] for Theoktonia, reactivated through liturgy, cannot be examined in the framework of rationalism given that it is inscribed in religious experience". But, she stresses, "it can be examined in relation to the mechanism of scapegoating, which constructs the 'Jew' as guilty not only for 'theoktonia' but for all the other suffering in the world as well". Furthermore, the custom should be examined in context with similar activities in pre-Christian festivals. Some of them have revived in the last decades as the gaelic/ Celtic festival of Beltaine, the burning of Böögg in Zurich and so on, where the act of burning a man's effigie supposedly increases fertility and exorcises the evil.

== See also ==
- History of the Jews in Greece
