= Loukas Karrer =

Greek politician

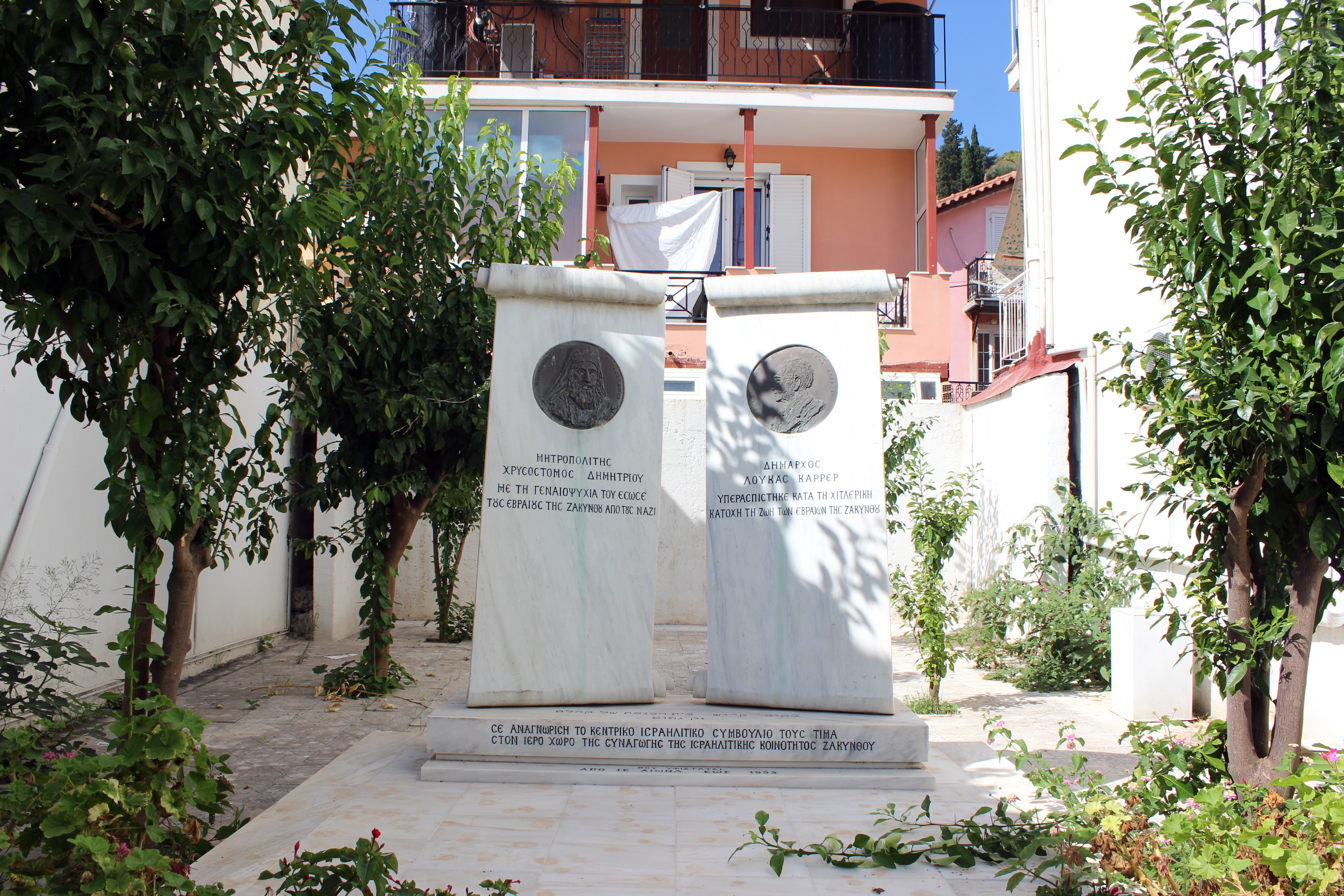
Monument to Karrer and Bishop Chrysostomos in Zakynthos

Loukas Karrer (Greek: Λουκάς Καρρέρ; 1909–1985) was a Greek politician, most notable as the mayor of the island of Zakynthos in 1937–1945.

In 1943, during the Axis occupation of Greece, along with the island's bishop, Chrysostomos, Karrer prevented the German occupation authorities from deporting any of the island's Jews.

In 1978, he and Bishop Chrysostomos were named among the "Righteous Among the Nations" by Yad Vashem.
