= National Union of Greece =

National Union of Greece Εθνική Ένωσις Ελλάδος
- Founder: Georgios Kosmidis
- Founded: 1927
- Dissolved: 1944
- Ideology: Nazism; Greek nationalism Fascism; Antisemitism; Venizelism; Anti-communism; Collaborationism
- Political position: Far-right
- Religion: Greek Orthodox

Party flag

The National Union of Greece (Greek: Εθνική Ένωσις Ελλάδος, ΕΕΕ; Ethniki Enosis Ellados, EEE) was a far-right political party established in Thessaloniki, Greece, in 1927.

Registered as a mutual aid society, the EEE was founded by Asia Minor refugee businesspeople. According to the organisation's constitution, only Christians could join. Its members were in political and, especially, commercial antagonism with Thessaloniki's substantial Jewish population.

Its founder, Georgios Kosmidis, was an illiterate Turkish-speaking merchant and tailor. Kosmidis claimed to be a Venizelist, and so did his party even though it was opposed to most Venizelist principles. He came from Constantinople but worked as a tailor in Thessaloniki. He was antisemitic and anticommunist; according to him, Jewish people "crucified Christ" and took customers away from his business, and communists were treacherous to Greek society and culture. Despite having founded the E. E. E. he did not often directly participate in it until he was elected its president in 1929. During the 1930s he sewed its members' khaki uniforms.

Owing to its military uniforms and organisation, the party was commonly referred to as "The Three Epsilons" (τα Τρία Εψιλον) or "The Steelhelmets" (οι Χαλυβδόκρανοι), in allusion to the German paramilitary Der Stahlhelm.

The EEE was dissolved upon the establishment of the Metaxas Regime in 1936, but was revived in 1941 by Georgios Poulos with German support after the fall of Thessaloniki. Shortly after, Poulos renamed the party to "Εθνική Σοσιαλιστική Ένωση Ελλάδος " (National Socialist Union of Greece).
