= Devin E. Naar =

Academic

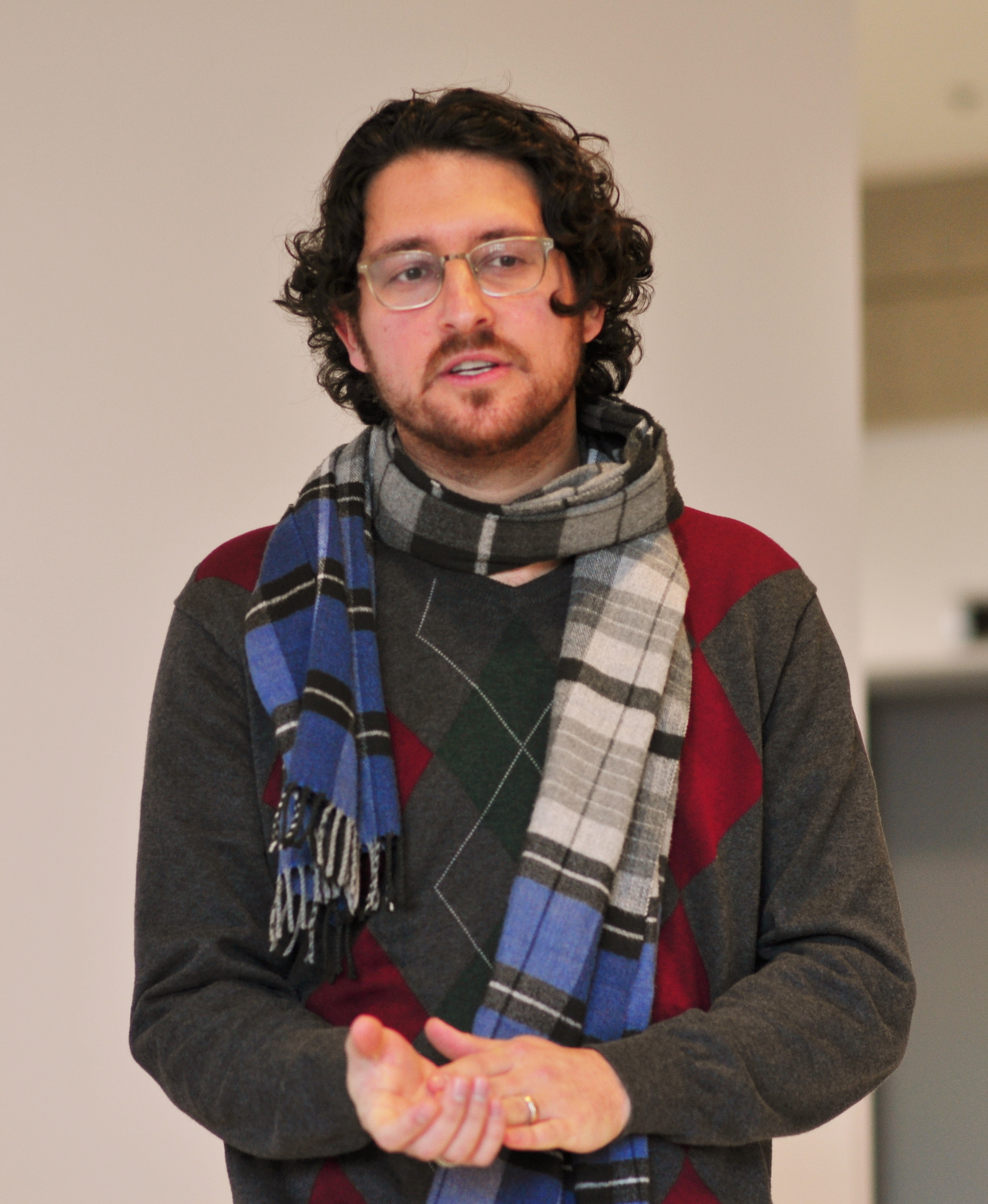
Devin Naar, 2018

Devin E. Naar is the Isaac Alhadeff Professor in Sephardic Studies at the University of Washington. He is descended from Greek Sephardic Jews who emigrated to the United States in the 1920s.

== Works ==
- Naar, Devin (2016). Jewish Salonica: Between the Ottoman Empire and Modern Greece. Stanford University Press. ISBN 978-0-8047-9887-7.
