= History of the Jews in Thessaloniki =

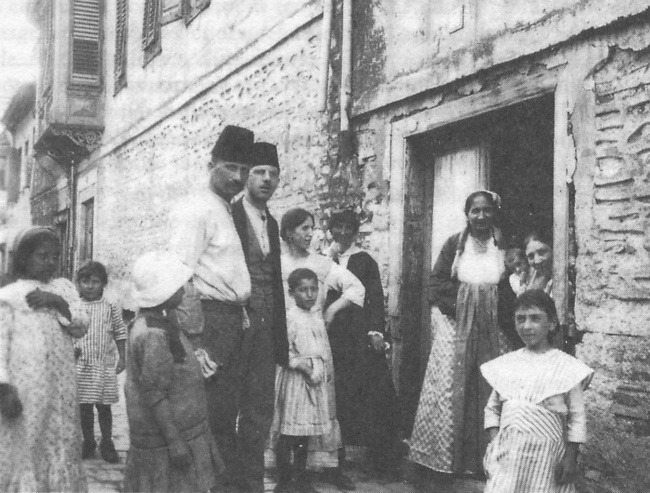
Jewish family of Salonika in 1917

The history of the Jews of Thessaloniki reaches back two thousand years. The city of Thessaloniki (also known as Salonika) housed a major Jewish community, mostly Eastern Sephardim, until the middle of the Second World War. Sephardic Jews immigrated to the city following the expulsion of Jews from Spain by Catholic rulers under the Alhambra Decree of 1492.

The community experienced a "golden age" in the 16th century, when they developed a strong culture in the city. Like other groups in Ottoman Greece, they continued to practice traditional culture during the time when Western Europe was undergoing industrialization. In the middle of the 19th century, Jewish educators and entrepreneurs came to Thessaloniki from Western Europe to develop schools and industries; they brought contemporary ideas from Europe that changed the culture of the city. With the development of industry, both Jewish and other ethnic populations became industrial workers and developed a large working class, with labor movements contributing to the intellectual mix of the city. In the 1920s, a century after Greece achieved independence from the Ottoman Empire (the city was captured from the Ottoman Empire by Greece in late 1912), it allowed Jews to be full citizens of the country.

During World War II, Greece was occupied by Nazi Germany and its allies. In 1941, the Axis powers started systematically persecuting the Salonican Jews. In 1943, the Salonican Jews were forced into a ghetto near the rail lines, and deportations began to the concentration camps and labor camps. The majority of the 72,000 in the community were murdered in the camps. This resulted in the near-extermination of the community. Many others after made aliyah to Israel. Only 1,200 Jews live in the city today.

== Early settlement ==
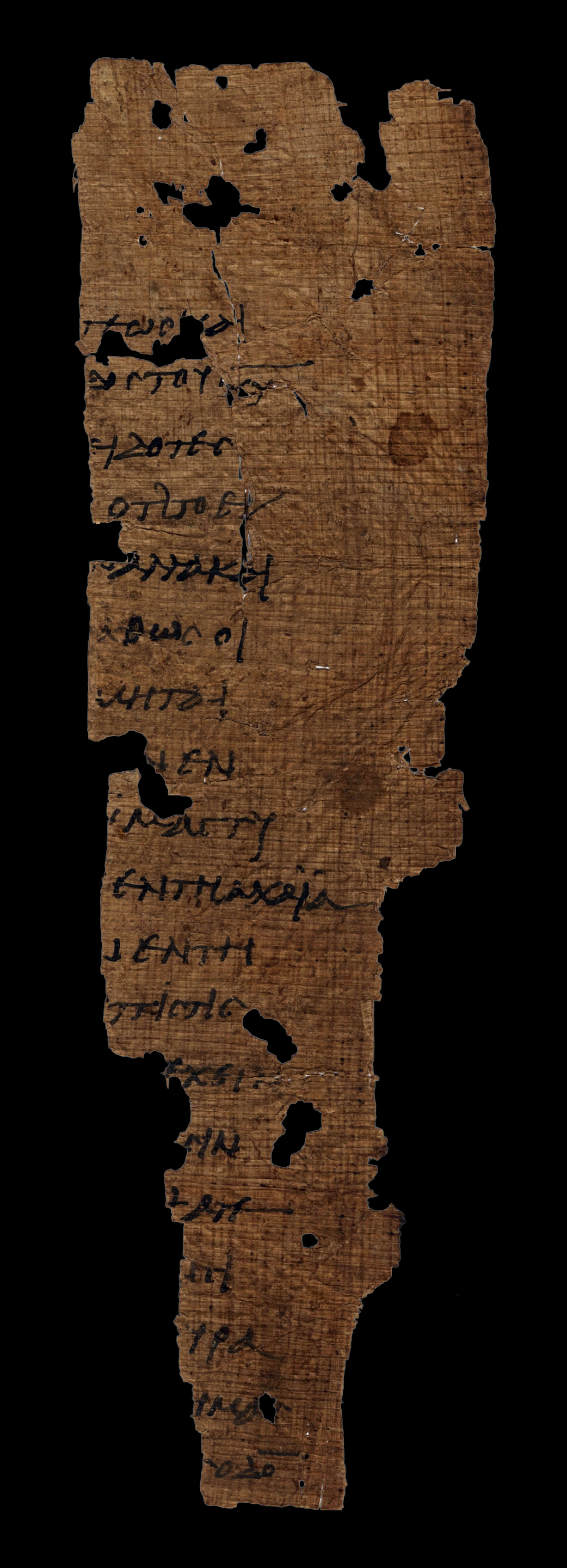
Fragment showing 1 Thessalonians 1:3–2:1 on Papyrus 65, from the third century CE.

Some scholars believed that Paul of Tarsus' First Epistle to the Thessalonians mentions Hellenized Jews in the city about 52 CE. This is based on certain interpretation of 1 Thessalonians 2:14 "For you, brethren, became imitators of the churches of God which are in Judea in Christ Jesus. For you also suffered the same things from your own countrymen, just as they did from the Judeans." (NKJV). Others believe that this Christian community consisted only of gentiles (pagans) and others that Jews were a small minority in that church of Thessalonike. The Greek word for "your own countrymen" in the original text is "συμφυλέται" (symphyletai, "of the same phyle[tribe/race/nation]"). The interpretation of "συμφυλέται" as "Jews" is debated by many scholars. Also, there is no firm archaeological and other written evidence for the existence of a Jewish community in Thessaloniki during the 1st half of the 1st century AD. However, the existence of such a community is considered as very likely, even if its character is not known. Researchers have not determined yet where the first Jews lived in the city.

In 1170, Benjamin of Tudela reported that there were 500 Jews in Thessaloniki. In the following centuries, the native Romaniote community was joined by some Italian and Ashkenazi Jews. A small Jewish population lived here during the Byzantine period, but it left virtually no trace in documents or archeological artifacts.

== Under the Ottomans ==
In 1430, the start of Ottoman domination, the Jewish population was still small. The Ottomans used population transfers within the empire following military conquests to achieve goals of border security or repopulation; they called it Sürgün. Following the fall of Constantinople in 1453, an example of sürgün was the Ottomans' forcing Jews from the Balkans and Anatolia to relocate there, which they made the new capital of the Empire. At the time, few Jews were left in Salonika; none were recorded in the Ottoman census of 1478.

=== Arrival of Sephardic Jews ===
Paths of Jewish immigration to Salonika

In 1492, the joint Catholic Monarchs of Spain Isabella I and Ferdinand II had promulgated the Alhambra Decree to expel Sephardic Jews from their domains. Many immigrated to Salonika, sometimes after a stop in Portugal or Italy. The Ottoman Empire granted protection to Jews as dhimmis and encouraged the newcomers to settle in its territories. According to the historians Rosamond McKitterick and Christopher Allmand, the Empire's invitation to the expelled Jews was a demographic strategy to prevent ethnic Greeks from dominating the city.

The first Sephardim came in 1492 from Mallorca and Catalonia. They were "repentant" returnees to Judaism after earlier forced conversion to Catholicism. In 1493, Jews from Castile and Sicily joined them. In subsequent years, other Jews came from those lands and also from Aragon, Naples, Venice and Provence. From the documented life of a converso who arrived in Salonica in the early 16th century, we learn that most of the Jews he encountered were from Valencia and central Castile, including Toledo and Guadalajara, and included former conversos he had known from Valencia. In 1519, Ottoman census records list 3,143 (or 3,147) Jewish households and 930 Jewish bachelors in Salonika, indicating a Jewish population of around 16,500 residing in the city at that time.

Later, in 1540 and 1560, Jews from Portugal sought refuge in Salonika in response to the political persecution of the marranos. In addition to these Sephardim, a few Ashkenazim arrived from Austria, Transylvania and Hungary. They were sometimes forcibly relocated under the Ottoman policy of "sürgün," following the conquest of land by Suleiman the Magnificent. In 1523, the Ottomans resettled 150 Jewish families from Salonika in Rhodes. Salonika's registers indicate the presence of "Buda Jews" after the conquest of that city by the Turks in 1541. The Jewish population of the city was 20,000 in 1553. Immigration was great enough that by 1519, the Jews represented 56% of the population and by 1613, 68%.

=== Religious organization ===
Each group of new arrivals founded its own community (aljama in Spanish), whose rites ("minhagim") differed from those of other communities. The synagogues cemented each group, and their names most often referred to the groups' origins. For example, Katallan Yashan (Old Catalan) was founded in 1492 and Katallan Hadash (New Catalonia) at the end of the 16th century.

Name of synagogue	Date of construction	Name of synagogue	Date of construction	Name of synagogue	Date of construction
Ets ha Hayim	1st century	Apulia	1502	Yahia	1560
Ashkenaz or Varnak	1376	Lisbon Yashan	1510	Sicilia Hadash	1562
Mayorka	1391	Talmud Torah Hagadol	1520	Beit Aron	1575
Provincia	1394	Portugal	1525	Italia Hadash	1582
Italia Yashan	1423	Evora	1535	Mayorka Sheni	16th century
Guerush Sfarad	1492	Estrug	1535	Katallan Hadash	16th century
Kastilla	1492–3	Lisbon Hadash	1536	Italia Sheni	1606
Aragon	1492–3	Otranto	1537	Shalom	1606
Katallan Yashan	1492	Ishmael	1537	Har Gavoa	1663
Kalabria Yashan	1497	Tcina	1545	Mograbis	17th century
Sicilia Yashan	1497	Nevei Tsedek	1550		
Monastirlis	1927				

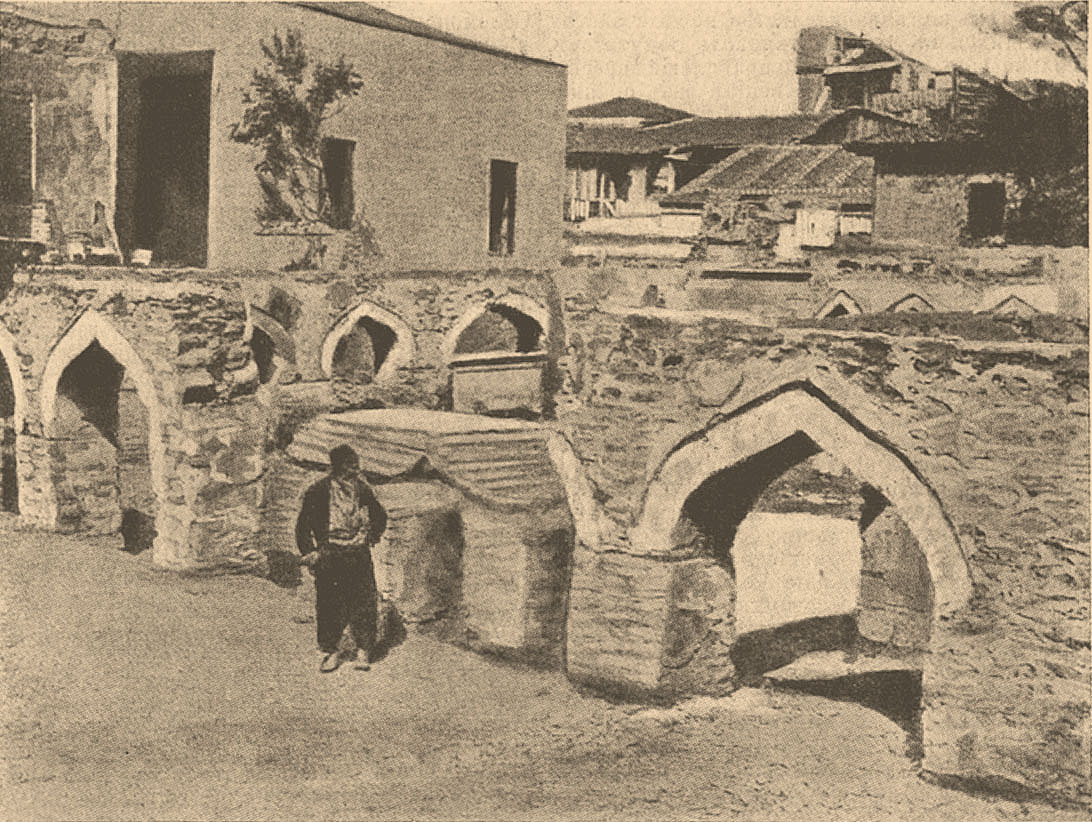
Ruins of the Catalan Synagogue. Before 1905.

A government institution called Talmud Torah Hagadol was introduced in 1520 to head all the congregations and make decisions (haskamot) that applied to all. It was administered by seven members with annual terms. This institution provided an educational program for young boys, and was a preparatory school for entry to yeshivot. It hosted hundreds of students. In addition to Jewish studies, it taught humanities, Latin and Arabic, as well as medicine, the natural sciences and astronomy. The yeshivot of Salonika were frequented by Jews from throughout the Ottoman Empire and even farther abroad; there were students from Italy and Eastern Europe. After completing their studies, some students were appointed rabbis in the Jewish communities of the Empire and Europe, including cities such as Amsterdam and Venice. The success of its educational institutions was such that there was no illiteracy among the Jews of Salonika.

=== Economic activities ===
Salonika (Salonique in French) was located in the heart of the Ottoman Empire. The city names are in French.

The Sephardic population settled mainly in the major urban centers of the Ottoman Empire, which included Salonika. Unlike other major cities of the Empire, the Jews controlled trading in Salonika. Their economic power became so great that the shipping and businesses stopped on Saturday (Shabbat)—the Jewish sabbath. They traded with the rest of the Ottoman Empire, and the countries of Latin Venice and Genoa, and with all the Jewish communities scattered throughout the Mediterranean. One sign of the influence of Salonikan Jews on trading is in the 1556 boycott of the port of Ancona, Papal States, in response to the auto-da-fé issued by Paul IV against 25 marranos.

Salonikan Jews were unique in their participation in all economic niches, not confining their business to a few sectors, as was the case where Jews were a minority. They were active in all levels of society, from porters to merchants. Salonika had a large number of Jewish fishermen, unmatched elsewhere, even in present-day Israel.

The Jewish speciality was spinning wool. They imported technology from Spain where this craft was highly developed. The community made rapid decisions (haskamot) to require all congregations to regulate this industry. They forbade, under pain of excommunication (cherem), the export of wool and indigo to areas less than three days' travel from the city. Salonikan sheets, blankets and carpets acquired a high profile and were exported throughout the empire from Istanbul to Alexandria through Smyrna. The industry spread to all localities close to the Thermaic Gulf.

This same activity became a matter of state when the Ottoman Sultan, Selim II, chose the Salonican Jews to be exclusive manufacturers of uniforms for the Ottoman Janissary troops. This made the city one of the most significant textile producers and exporters in the eastern Mediterranean. His Sublime Porte issued a firman in 1576 forcing sheep raisers to provide their wool exclusively to the Jews to guarantee the adequacy of their supply. Other provisions strictly regulated the types of woollen production, production standards and deadlines. Tons of woollen goods were transported by boat, camel and horse to Istanbul to cloak the janissaries against the approaching winter. Towards 1578, both sides agreed that the supply of wool would serve as sufficient payment by the State for cloth and replace the cash payment. This turned out to be disadvantageous for the Jews.

=== Economic decline ===
The increase in the number of Janissaries contributed to an increase in clothing orders putting Jews in a very difficult situation. Contributing to their problems were currency inflation concurrent with a state financial crisis.

Only 1,200 shipments were required initially. However, the orders surpassed 4,000 in 1620. Financially challenged, the factories began cheating on quality. This was discovered. Rabbi Judah Covo at the head of a Salonican delegation was summoned to explain this deterioration in Istanbul and was sentenced to hang. This left a profound impression in Salonika. Thereafter, applications of the Empire were partially reduced and reorganized production.

These setbacks were heralds of a dark period for Salonican Jews. The flow of migrants from the Iberian Peninsula had gradually dried up. Jews favored such Western European cities as London, Amsterdam and Bordeaux. This phenomenon led to a progressive estrangement of the Ottoman Sephardim from the West. Although the Jews had brought many new European technologies, including that of printing, they became less and less competitive against other ethno-religious groups. The earlier well-known Jewish doctors and translators were gradually replaced by their Christian counterparts, mostly Armenians and Greeks. In the world of trading, the Jews were supplanted by Western Christians, who were protected by the western powers through their consular bodies. Salonika lost its pre-eminence following the phasing out of Venice, its commercial partner, and the rising power of the port of Smyrna.

Moreover, the Jews, like other dhimmis, had to suffer the consequences of successive defeats of the Empire by the West. The city, strategically placed on a road travelled by armies, often saw retaliation by janissaries against "infidels." Throughout the 17th century, there was migration of Jews from Salonika to Constantinople, Palestine, and especially İzmir. The Jewish community of Smyrna became composed of Salonikan émigrés. Plague, along with other epidemics such as cholera, which arrived in Salonika in 1823, also contributed to the weakening of Salonika and its Jewish community.

Western products, which began to appear in the East in large quantities in the early-to-mid-19th century, was a severe blow to the Salonikan economy, including the Jewish textile industry. The state eventually even began supplying janissaries with "Provencal clothing", which sold in low-priced lots, in preference to Salonican wools, whose quality had continued to deteriorate. Short of cash, the Jews were forced into paying the grand vizier more than half of their taxes in the form of promissory notes. Textile production declined rapidly and then stopped with the abolition of the body of janissaries in 1826.

=== Taxation ===
Ottoman Jews were obliged to pay special "Jewish taxes" to the Ottoman authorities. These taxes included the Cizye, the İspençe, the Haraç, and the Rav akçesi ("rabbi tax"). Sometimes, local rulers would also levy taxes for themselves, in addition to the taxes sent to the central authorities in Constantinople.

=== Later Ottoman era ===
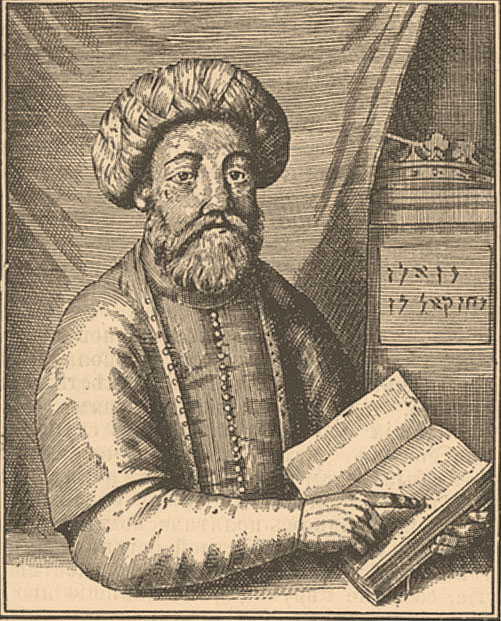
Sabbatai Zevi. Portrait by an eyewitness, Smyrna, 1666.

Jewish Salonikans had long benefited from the contribution of each of the ideas and knowledge of the various waves of Sephardic immigration, but this human contribution more or less dried up by the 17th century, and sank into a pattern of significant decline. The yeshivot were always busy teaching, but their output was very formalistic. They published books on religion, but these had little original thought. A witness reported that "outside it is always endless matters of worship and commercial law that absorb their attention and bear the brunt of their studies and their research. Their works are generally a restatement of their predecessors' writings."

From the 15th century, a messianic current had developed in the Sephardic world; the Redemption, marking the end of the world, which seemed imminent. This idea was fueled both by the economic decline of Salonika and the continued growth in Kabbalistic studies based on the Zohar booming in Salonican yeshivot. The end of time was announced successively in 1540 and 1568 and again in 1648 and 1666.

It is in this context that there arrived a young and brilliant Rabbi who had been expelled from nearby Smyrna: Sabbatai Zevi. Banned from this city in 1651 after proclaiming himself the messiah, he came to Salonika, where his reputation as a scholar and Kabbalist grew very quickly. The greatest numbers to follow him were members of the Shalom Synagogue, often former marranos. After several years of caution, he again caused a scandal when, during a solemn banquet in the courtyard of the Shalom Synagogue, he pronounced the Tetragrammaton, ineffable in Jewish tradition, and introduced himself as the Messiah son of King David. The federal rabbinical council then drove him from the city, but Sabbatai Zevi went to disseminate his doctrine in other cities around the Sephardic world. His passage divided, as it did everywhere, Thessaloniki's Jewish community, and this situation caused so much turmoil that Sabbatai Zevi was summoned and imprisoned by the sultan. There, rather than prove his supernatural powers, he relented under fire, and instead converted to Islam. The dramatic turn of events was interpreted in various ways by his followers, the Sabbateans. Some saw this as a sign and converted themselves, while others rejected his doctrine and returned to Judaism. Some, though, remained publicly faithful to Judaism while continuing to secretly follow the teachings of Sabbatai Zevi. In Salonika, there were 300 families among the richest who decided in 1686 to embrace Islam before the rabbinical authorities could react, their conversion already having been happily accepted by the Ottoman authorities. Therefore, those that the Turks gave the surname "Dönme," ("renegades") themselves divided into three groups: Izmirlis, Kuniosos and Yacoubi, forming a new component of the Salonikan ethno-religious mosaic. Although they chose conversion, they did not assimilate with the Turks, practicing strict endogamy, living in separate quarters, building their own mosques and maintaining a specific liturgy in their language. They participated in the 19th century in the spread of modernist ideas in the empire. Then, as Turks, the Donme emigrated from the city following the assumption of power by the Greeks.

== Modern times ==
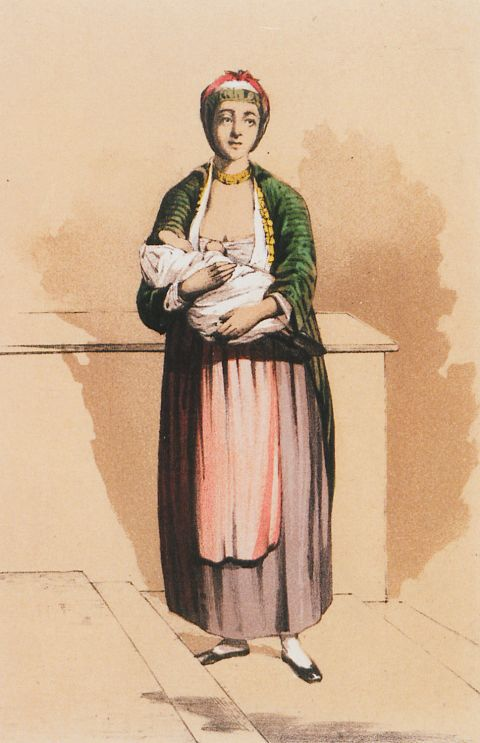
Gravure of Jewish woman (late 19th century)

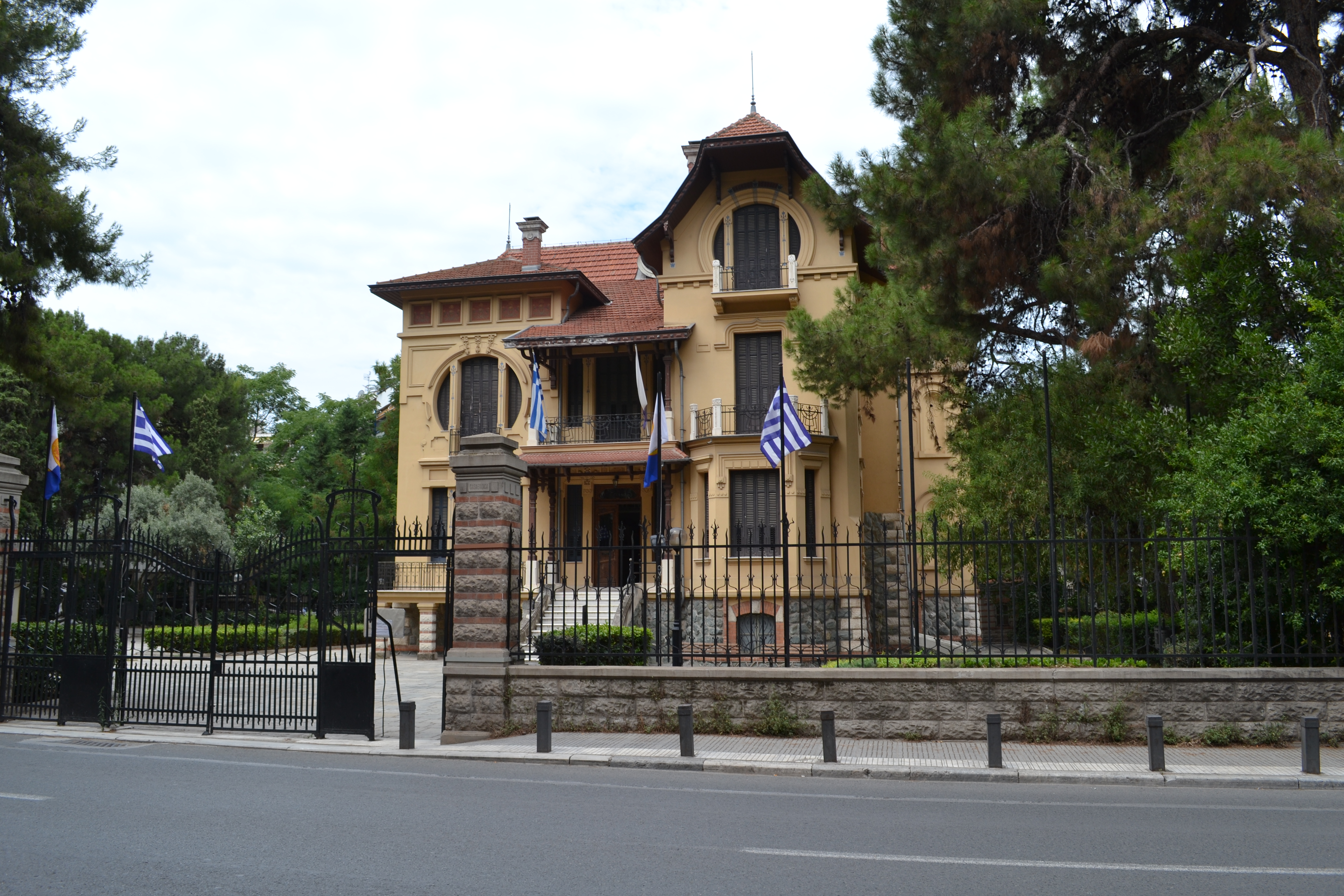
Villa Bianca, residence of the Fernandez family

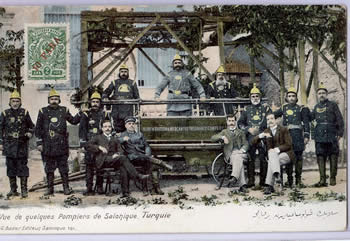
Jewish firemen, 1911

From the second half of the 19th century, the Jews of Salonika had a new revival. Frankos, French and Italian Jews from Livorno, were especially influential in introducing new methods of education and developing new schools and intellectual environment for the Jewish population. Such Western modernists introduced new techniques and ideas to the Balkans from the industrialized world.

=== Religion ===
A prime factor in the development of Salonika into an economic center was its complex rabbinical authority. This stemmed from, according to K.E. Fleming, the rabbis' openness and tolerance of different groups of people. This is especially true of conversos, or Jews whose families converted to Christianity whilst living in Spain or Portugal in order to avoid persecution or potential expulsion. A common practice among conversos who wished to live in Salonika was the practice of Teshuvah. This was the concept of Jews returning to Judaism after previously converting, or after an ancestor converted. According to Fleming, the number of conversos returning to the faith whilst also immigrating to Salonika, made for a dynamic rabbinic establishment. In many cases, the process of reconverting back to Judaism was automatic and it required no extended arbitration by the rabbis. The kehalim—or congregations of Salonika—wanted to make sure that the process of Teshuvah was as smooth as possible for the participants. The process had gone on for centuries before the modern era. Multiple responsums document the Teshuvah proceedings. In one instance, a converso man claimed that he was Jewish in his father's side and was accepted back into the Jewish faith. This willingness to accept those back into the faith, made Salonika into an economic powerhouse, much to the ire of Greece. By the late 1800s, Salonika had grown to be much larger and more prosperous than Athens, and a target of Greek conquest.

=== Industrialization ===
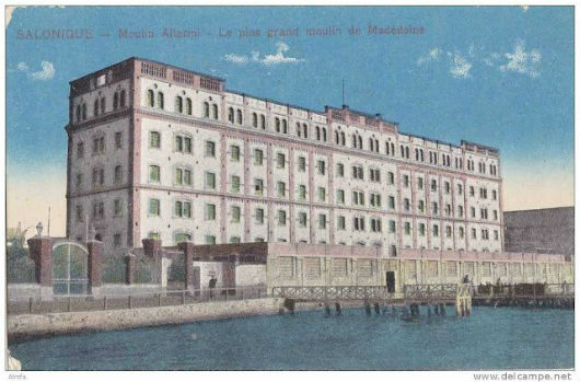
Old postcard showing the Allatini Mills

From the 1880s the city began to industrialize, within the Ottoman Empire whose larger economy was declining. New port works were inaugurated and modern banks opened. The entrepreneurs in Thessaloniki were mostly Jewish, unlike in other major Ottoman cities, where industrialization was led by other ethno-religious groups. The Italian Allatini brothers led Jewish entrepreneurship, establishing in 1854 the first modern flour-milling industrial plant and other food industries, brickmaking, and processing plants for tobacco. Several traders supported the introduction of a large textile-production industry, superseding the weaving of cloth in a system of artisanal production. The Jews owned 38 of the 54 largest trading houses in the city, and furnished the overwhelming majority of its labour force.

With industrialization, many Salonikans of all faiths became factory workers, part of a new proletariat. Given their population of 70,000 souls in the city, approximately half the total, a large Jewish working class developed. In addition to 4,000 merchants and 4,000 small tradesmen, 2,000 porters, 600 boatmen, 250 street vendors, 250 butchers, 220 craftsmen/artisans, 150 fishermen, 500 coachmen and carters, 100 household servants, 2,000 waiters, 50 wood-cutters, 500 practitioners of various manual crafts, 8,000 clerks, 8,000 labourers, 300 teachers, were Jews. Employers hired labor without regard for religion or ethnicity, unlike the common practice in other parts of the Ottoman Empire. In the city, workers movements developed crossing ethnic lines; in later years, the labor movements here became marked by issues of nationalism and identity.

=== Haskalah ===
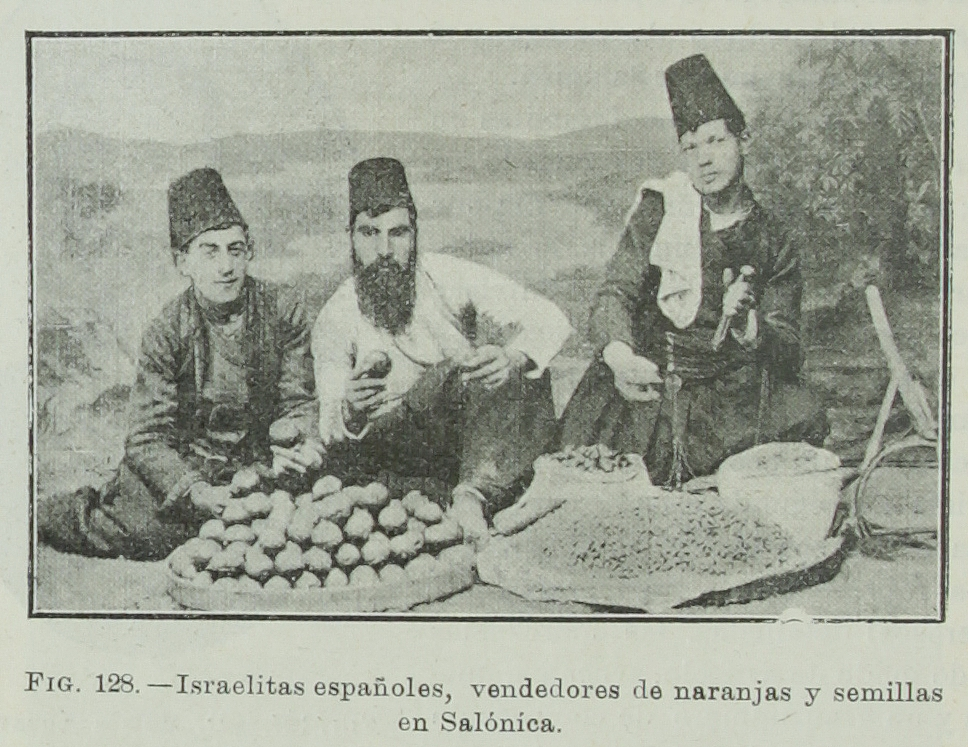
The Jews of Thessaloniki occupied places throughout the social ladder: from wealthy entrepreneurs to street fruit vendors.

The Haskalah, the movement of thought inspired by the Jewish Enlightenment, touched the Ottoman world at the end of the 19th century, after its spread among Jewish populations of Western and Eastern Europe. These western groups helped stimulate the city's economic revival.

The maskilim and Moses Allatini from Livorno, Italy, brought new educational style. In 1856, with the help of the Rothschilds, he founded a school, having gained consent of rabbis whom he had won over with major donations to charities. The Lippman School was a model institution headed by Professor Lippman, a progressive rabbi from Strasbourg. After five years, the school closed its doors and Lippman was pressured by the rabbinat, who disagreed with the school's innovative education methods. He trained numerous pupils who took over thereafter.

By 1862, Allatini led his brother Solomon Fernandez to found an Italian school, thanks to a donation by the Kingdom of Italy. French attempts to introduce the educational network of the Alliance Israélite Universelle (IAU) failed against resistance by the rabbis, who did not want a Jewish school under the patronage of the French embassy. But the need for schools was so urgent that supporters were finally successful in 1874. Allatini became a member of the central committee of the IAU in Paris and its patron in Thessaloniki. In 1912, nine new IAU schools IAU served the education of both boys and girls from kindergarten to high school; at the same time, the rabbinical seminaries were in decline. As a result, the French language became more widely used within the Jewish community of Salonika. These schools had instruction in both manual and intellectual training. They produced a generation familiar with the developments of the modern world, and able to enter the workforce of a company in the process of industrialization.

=== Political and social activism ===
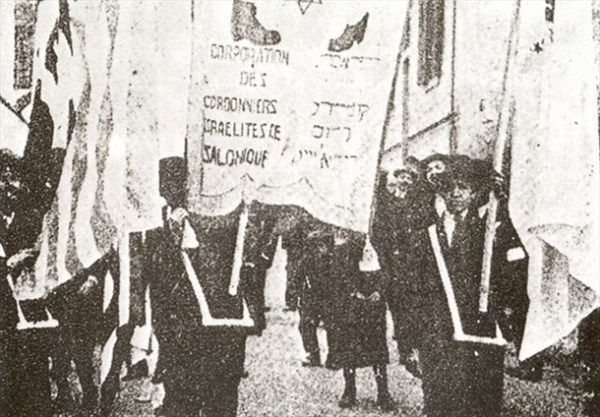
Jewish workers of the Socialist Workers' Federation march, 1908 - 1909

The Jewish community was pioneer in the establishment of the first newspapers in the city. Some of them included: La Epoca (1875), El Avenir, La Nation, La Liberdad, La Tribuna Libera, La Solidaridad Obradera, and after 1912, Avanti, La Nueva Epoca, El Liberal, El Consejero, El Combate, El Martillo, Pro Israel, La Esperanza, Accion, El Tiempo, El Macabeo, El Popular, El Professional, Messagero and many more.

The eruption of modernity was also expressed by the growing influence of new political ideas from Western Europe. The Young Turk revolution of 1908 with its bases in Salonika proclaimed a constitutional monarchy. The Jews did not remain indifferent to the enormous social and political change of the era, and were active most often in the social rather than national sphere. As the city began to take in the broader modern influences of the early 20th century, the movement of workers to organize and engage in social struggles for the improvement of working conditions began to spread. An attempt at union of different nationalities within a single labor movement took place with the formation of the Socialist Workers' Federation led by Avraam Benaroya, a Jew from Bulgaria, who started publication of a quadrilingual Journal of the worker aired in Ladino (Journal del Labourador), Ottoman Turkish (Amele Gazetesi), Bulgarian and Greek. However, the Balkan context was conducive to division, and affected the movement; after the departure of Bulgarian element, the Federation was heavily composed of Jews.

The Zionist movement thus faced competition for Jewish backing from the Socialist Workers' Federation, which was very antizionist. Unable to operate in the working class, Zionism in Salonika turned to the smaller group of the middle classes and intellectuals.

== Greek administration ==
=== Salonika, Greek city ===
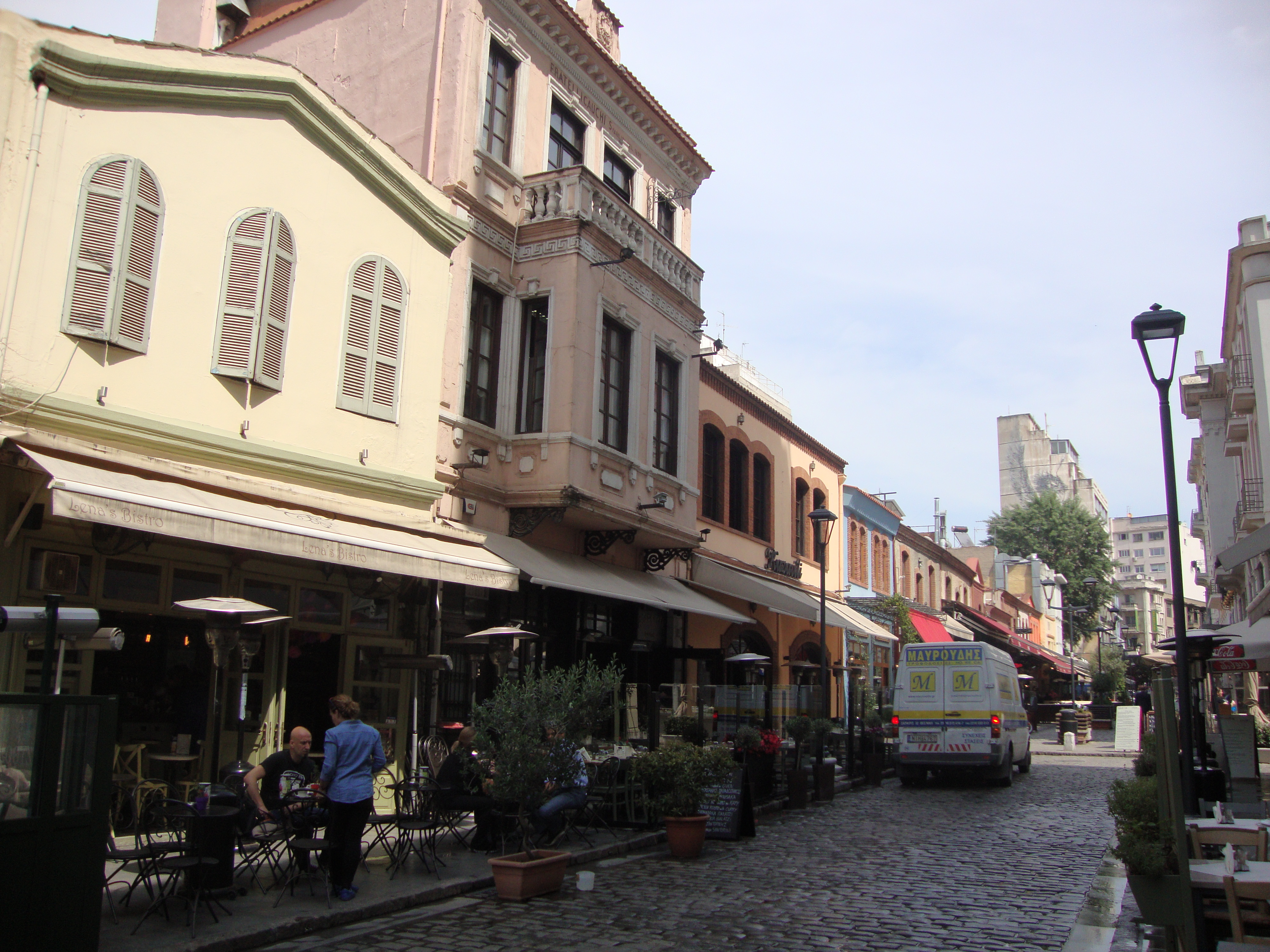
Street of Ladadika, one of the main districts of the Jewish population, near the Port of Thessaloniki

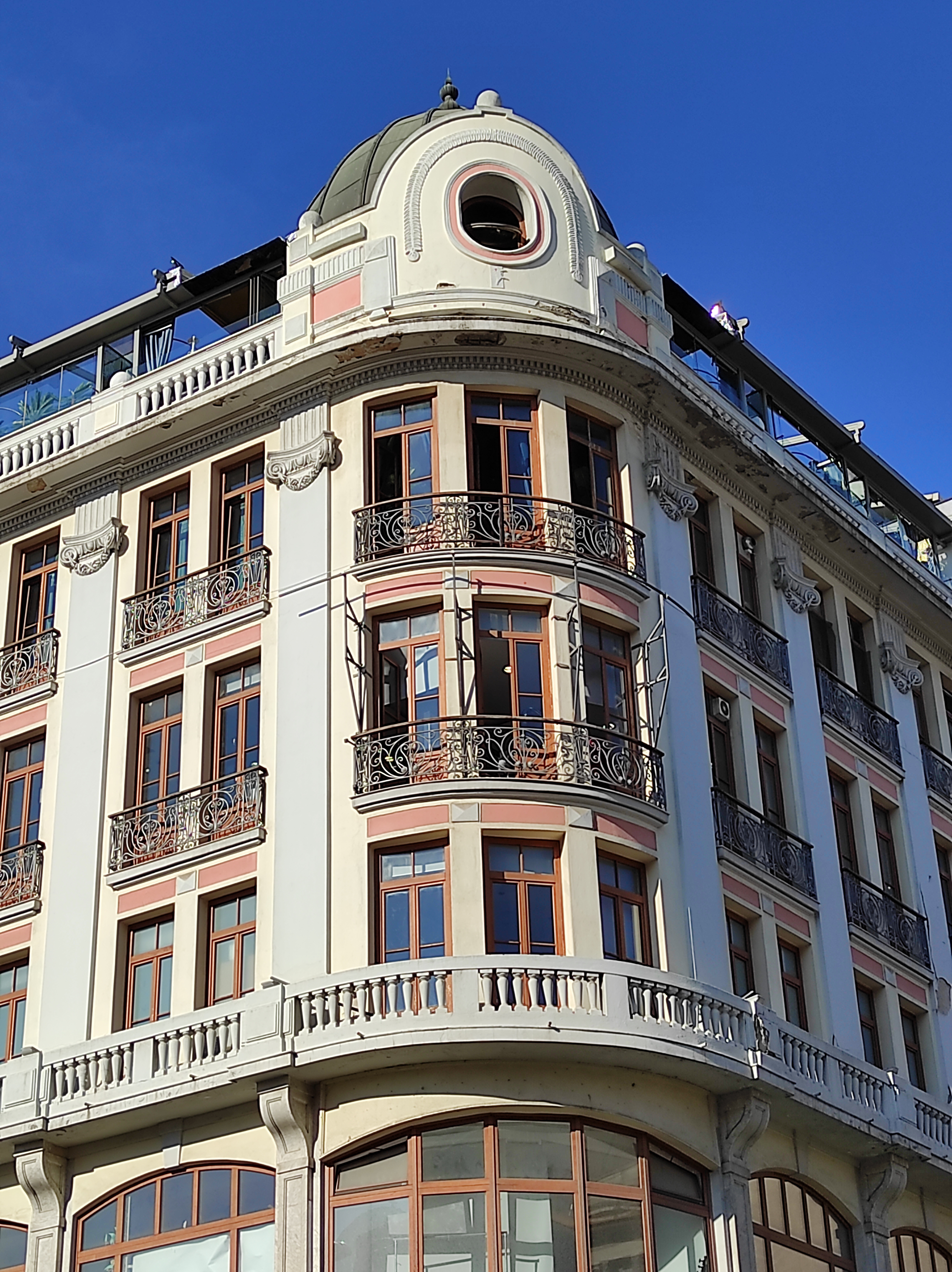
Malah mansion (1924, arch. Joseph Pleyber)

In 1912, following the First Balkan War, the Greeks took control of Salonika and eventually integrated the city in their territory. This change of sovereignty was not at first well received by the Jews, who feared that the annexation would lead to difficulties, a concern reinforced by Bulgarian propaganda, and by the Serbians, who wanted Austrian Jews to join their cause. Some Jews fought for the internationalization of the city under the protection of the great European powers, but their proposal received little attention, Europe having accepted the fait accompli. The Greek administration nevertheless took some measures to promote the integration of Jews such as permitting them to work on Sundays and allowing them to observe Shabbat. The economy benefitted from the annexation, which opened to Salonika the doors of markets in northern Greece and Serbia (with which Greece was in alliance), and by the influx of Entente troops following the outbreak of World War I. The Greek government was positive towards the development of Zionism and the establishment of a Jewish home in Palestine, which converged with the Greek desire to dismember the Ottoman Empire. The city received the visit of Zionist leaders David Ben-Gurion, Yitzhak Ben-Zvi and Ze'ev Jabotinsky, who saw in Salonika a Jewish model that should inspire their future state.

At the same time, some among the local population at the time did not share their government's view. A witness, Jean Leune, correspondent for L'Illustration during the Balkan wars and then an army officer from the East, says:

Faced with the countless shops and stores run by the Jews, until then the leaders in local commerce, Greek merchants set shop on the sidewalk, making access to the shop's doors impossible. The new police smiled ... and Jews, being boycotted, closed shop one after another.

=== Fire of 1917 and inter-communal tensions ===
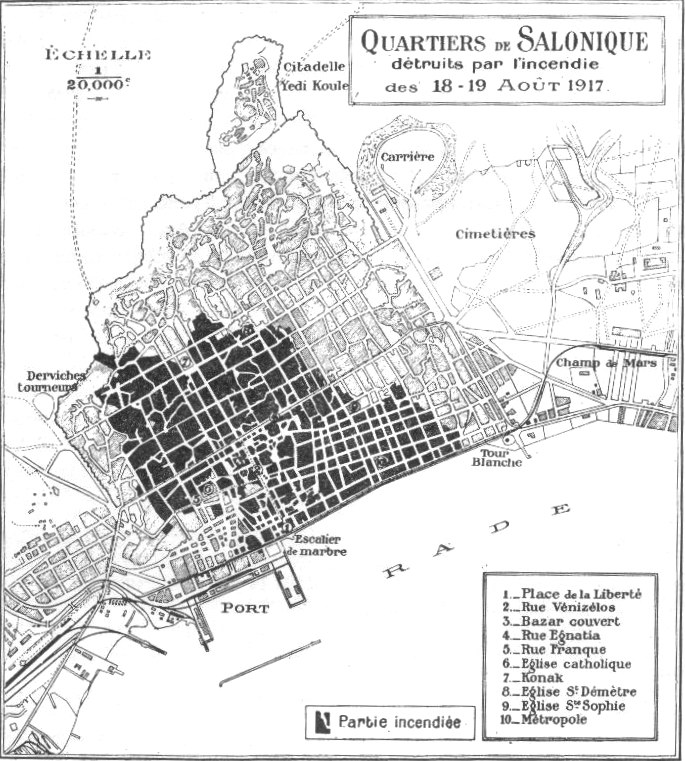
Low-lying districts, where a majority of Jews lived, were seriously affected by the Great Thessaloniki Fire of 1917

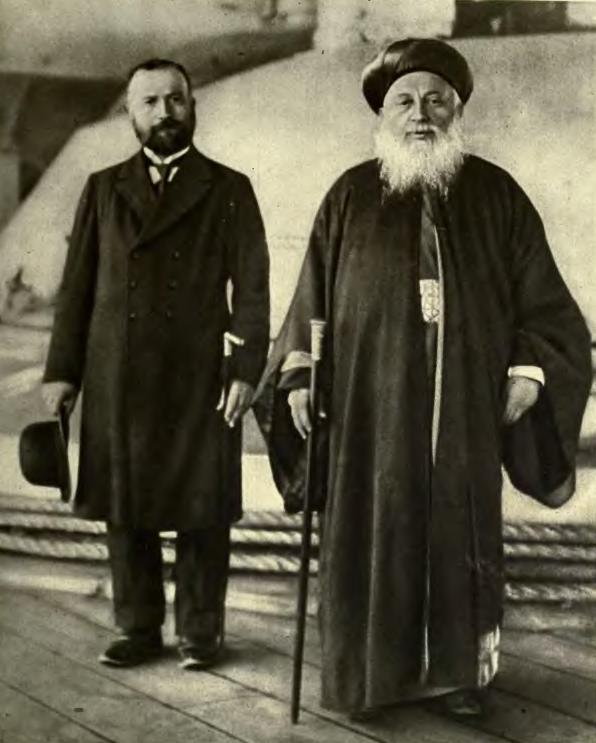
Rabbi of the city, 1918

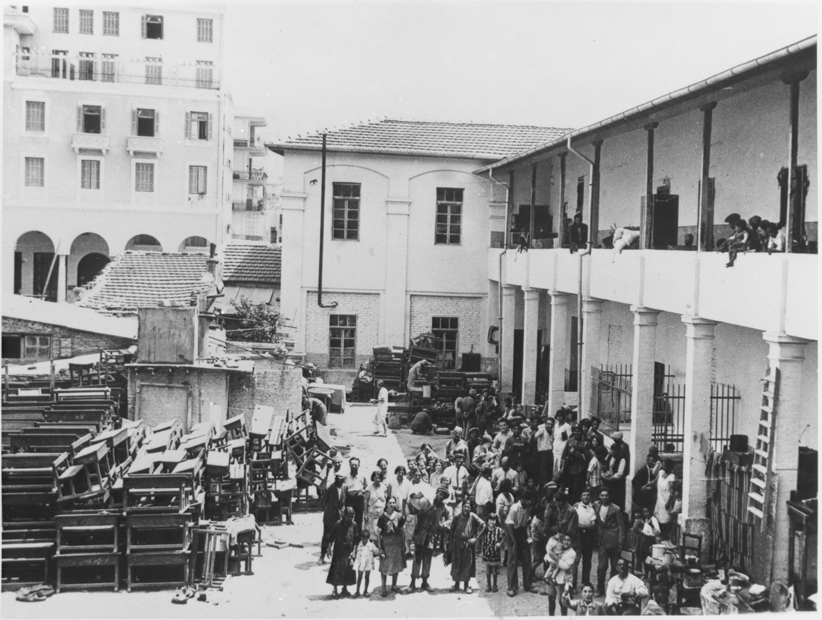
Families homeless following the pogrom (Campbell attack) of 1931. Photo taken somewhere near Aristotelous street

The Great Thessaloniki Fire of 1917 was a disaster for the community. The Jewish community was concentrated in the lower part of town and was thus the one most affected: the fire destroyed the seat of the Grand Rabbinate and its archives, as well as 16 of 33 synagogues in the city. 52,000 Jews were left homeless. One effect of the great fire was that nearly half of the city's Jewish homes and livelihoods were destroyed, leading to massive Jewish emigration. Many went to Palestine, others to Paris, while others found their way to the United States.

Opting for a different course from the reconstruction that had taken place after the fire of 1890, the Greek administration decided on a modern urban redevelopment plan by the Frenchman Ernest Hebrard. Therefore, it expropriated all land from residents, giving them nevertheless a right of first refusal on new housing reconstructed according to a new plan. It was, however, the Greeks who mostly populated the new neighborhoods, while Jews often chose to resettle the city's new suburbs.

Although the first anniversary of the Balfour Declaration was celebrated with a splendor unmatched in Europe, the decline had begun. The influx of tens of thousands of Greek refugees from Asia Minor, and the departure of Dönme Jews and Muslims from the region as a result of the Greco-Turkish War (1919–1922) and the Treaty of Lausanne (1923), significantly changed the ethnic composition of the city. The Jews ceased to constitute an absolute majority and, on the eve of the Second World War, they accounted for just 40% of the population.

During the period, a segment of the population began to demonstrate a less conciliatory policy towards the Jews. The Jewish population reacted by siding with the Greek monarchists during the Greek National Schism (opposing Eleftherios Venizelos, who had the overwhelming support of refugees and the lower income classes). This would set the stage for a 20-year period during which the relationship of the Jews with the Greek state and people would oscillate as Greek politics changed.

The friction was exacerbated by the issue of the expropriation of the extensive Jewish cemetery on behalf of the Aristotle University, the anti-constitutional measure of separate electoral associations, the institution in 1922 of the statutory Sunday holiday (forcing Jews to either work on Shabbat or lose income), posters in foreign languages were prohibited, and the authority of rabbinical courts to rule on commercial cases was taken away. As in countries such as Hungary and Romania, a significant current of antisemitism grew in inner Salonika, but "never reached the level of violence in these two countries". It was very much driven by Greek arrivals from Asia Minor, mostly poor and in direct competition with Jews for housing and work. This current of sentiment was, nevertheless, relayed by the Makedonia daily, which was close to Venizelos' Liberal Party, and the National Union of Greece (Ethniki Enosis Ellados, EEE) ultra-nationalist organization accusing the Jewish population of not wanting to blend in with the Greek nation, and viewing the development of Communism and Zionism in the community with suspicion. The distressing result of this poisoning of public opinion was the arson of the Hebrew Campbell neighbourhood by the EEE in June 1931. Venizelist Greek governments themselves largely adopted an ambivalent attitude, pursuing a policy of engagement while not distancing themselves unequivocally from the current of antisemitism.

=== Under Metaxas ===
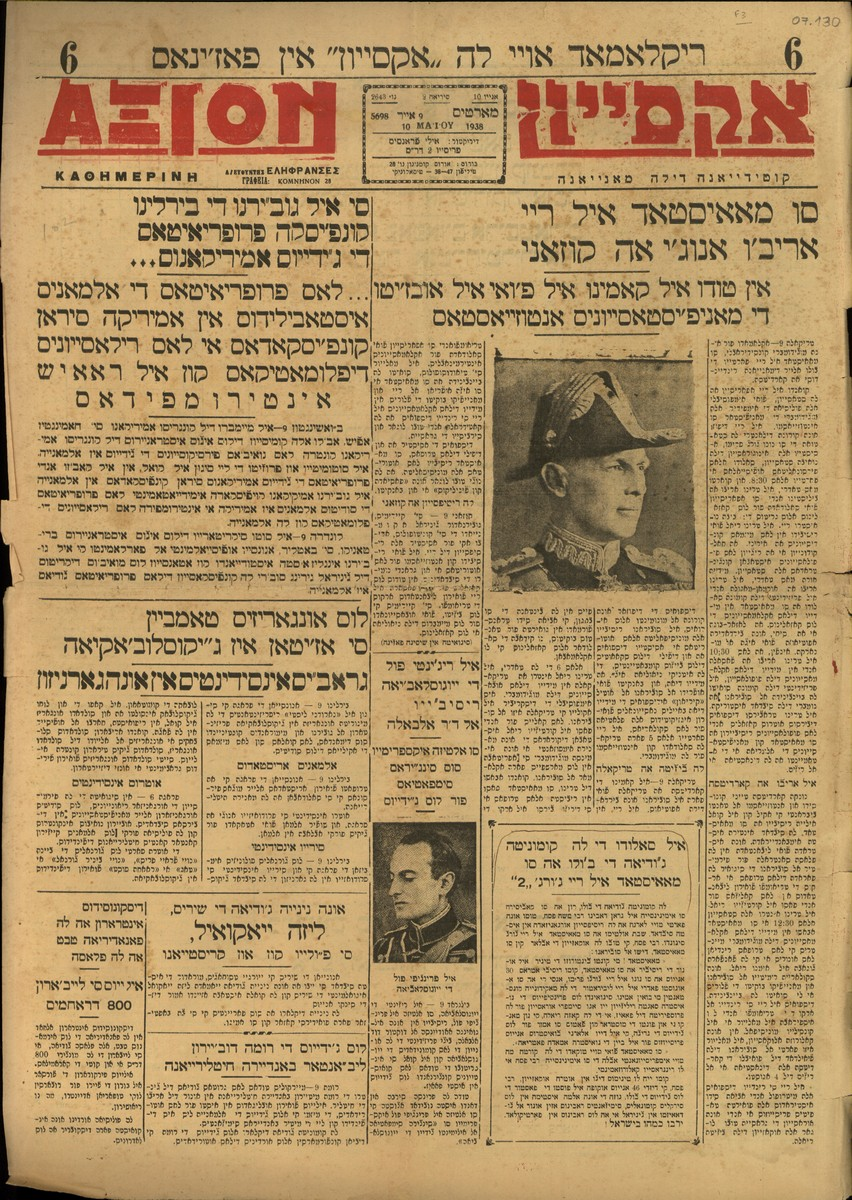
Accion (Αξιον, אקסייון), Jewish newspaper of the city (10 May 1938)

The seizure of power by dictator Ioannis Metaxas in 1936 had a significant bearing on the pattern of Greek–Jewish relations in Thessaloniki. Metaxas' regime was not antisemitic; it perceived the Venizelists and the Communists as its political enemies, and Bulgaria as its major foreign enemy. This endeared Metaxas to two influential Jewish groups: the upper/middle classes, which felt threatened by organized labor and the socialist movement, and Jewish refugees who had fled Bulgaria and the Bitola region during the Balkan Wars. Antisemitic organizations and publications were banned and support for the regime was sufficiently strong for a Jewish charter of the regime-sponsored National Organisation of Youth (EON) to be formed. This reinforced the trend of national self-identification as Greeks among the Jews of Salonika, who had been Greek citizens since 1913. Even in the concentration camps, Greek Jews never ceased to affirm their sense of belonging to the Greek nation.

At the same time, the working-class poor of the Jewish community had joined forces with their Christian counterparts in the labor movement that developed in the 1930s, often the target of suppression during Metaxas' regime. Avraam Benaroya was a leading figure in the Greek Socialist Movement, not only among Jews, but on a national level. Thus the forces of the period had worked to bridge the gaps between Christians and Jews, while creating new tensions among the different socioeconomic groups within the city and the country as a whole.

=== Emigration ===
Emigration of Jews from the city began when the Young Turks pushed through the universal conscription of all Ottoman subjects into the military irrespective of religion, a trend that continued to grow after the annexation of the city by Greece. Damage from the Thessaloniki fire, poor economic conditions, rise in antisemitism among a segment of the population, and the development of Zionism all motivated the departure of part of the city's Jewish population, mainly for Western Europe, South America and Palestine. The Jewish population decreased from 93,000 people to 53,000 on the eve of the war. There were some notable successes among the community's diaspora. Isaac Carasso, reaching Barcelona, founded the Danone company. Mordechai Mano became in Israel one of the pioneers in the maritime industry and Israeli economy in general. Maurice Abravanel went to Switzerland with his family and then to the United States where he became a famous conductor. A future grandparent of the French President Nicolas Sarkozy emigrated to France. In the interwar years, some Jewish families were to be found in the 9th arrondissement of Paris, France; The seat of their association was located on the Rue La Fayette. In Palestine, the Recanati family established one of the most important banks of Israel, the Eretz Yisrael Discount Bank, which later became the Israel Discount Bank.

== Second World War ==
=== Battle of Greece ===
On 28 October 1940, Italian forces invaded Greece following the refusal of the Greek dictator Ioannis Metaxas to accept the ultimatum given by the Italians. In the resulting Greco-Italian War and the subsequent German invasion, many of Thessaloniki's Jews took part. 12,898 men enlisted in the Greek army; 4,000 participated in the campaigns in Albania and Macedonia; 513 fought against the Germans and, in total, 613 Jews were killed, including 174 from Salonika. The 50th Brigade of Macedonia was nicknamed "Cohen Battalion", reflecting the preponderance of Jews in its composition. After the defeat of Greece, many Jewish soldiers suffered frostbite while returning home on foot.

=== Occupation ===
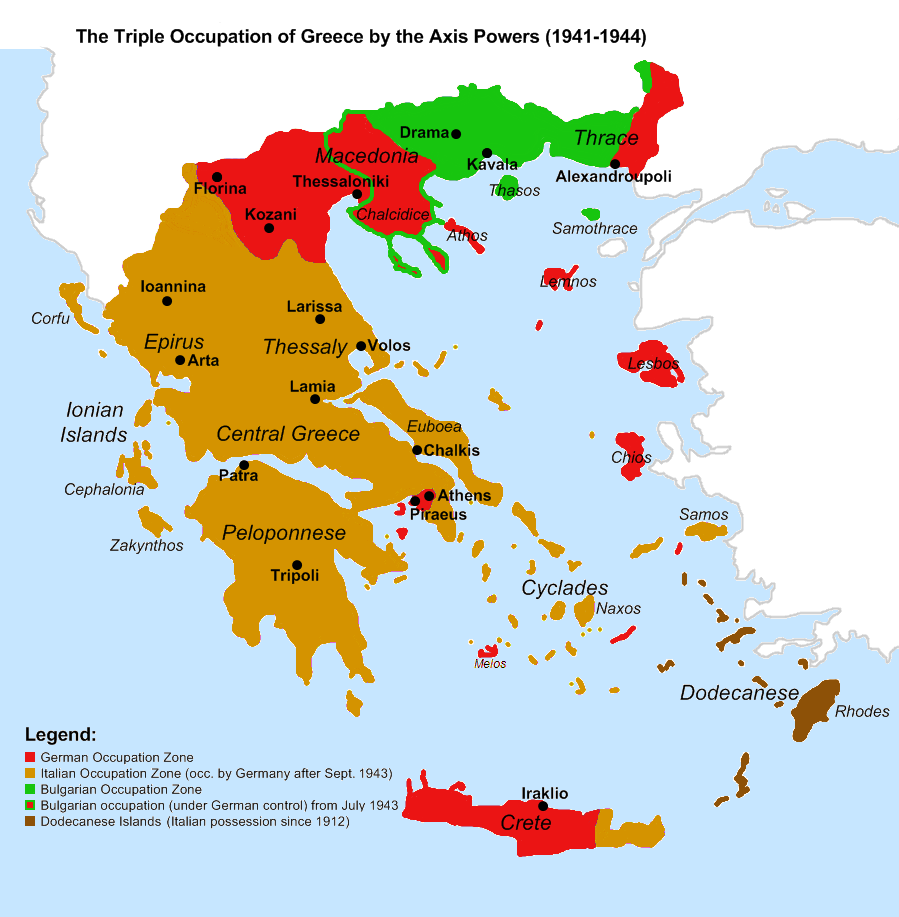
Greece partitioned between Germans, Italians and Bulgarians: German occupation Italian occupation Bulgarian occupation The Dodecanese (Italian territory before the war)

Central Macedonia, including Thessaloniki, was occupied by the Germans, who entered the city on 9 April 1941. Antisemitic measures were only gradually introduced. Max Merten, the German civil administrator for the city, continued to repeat that the Nuremberg Laws would not apply to Salonika. The Jewish press was quickly banned, while two pro-Nazi Greek dailies, Nea Evropi ("New Europe") and Apogevmatini ("Evening Press"), appeared. Some homes and community buildings were requisitioned by the occupying forces, including the Baron Hirsch Hospital. In late April, signs prohibiting Jews entry to cafés appeared. Jews were forced to turn in their radios.

The Grand Rabbi of Salonika, Zvi Koretz, was arrested by the Gestapo on 17 May 1941 and sent to a Nazi concentration camp near Vienna, from where he returned in late January 1942 to resume his position as rabbi. In June 1941, commissioner Alfred Rosenberg arrived. He plundered Jewish archives, sending tons of documents to his pet project, the Institute for Study of the Jewish Question in Frankfurt.

Along with the other Greek urban communities, the Jews suffered a severe famine in the winter of 1941–42. The Nazi regime had not attached any importance to the Greek economy, food production or distribution. It is estimated that in 1941–1942 sixty Jews of the city died every day from hunger.

For a year, no further antisemitic action was taken. The momentary reprieve gave the Jews a temporary sense of security.

On July 11, 1942, known as the "Black Shabbat," all the men of the community aged 18 to 45 years were rounded up in Eleftherias Square (Freedom Square) in the city center. Throughout the afternoon, they were forced to do humiliating physical exercises at gunpoint. Four thousand of them were ordered to construct a road for the Germans, linking Thessaloniki to Kateríni and Larissa, a region rife with malaria.

In less than ten weeks, 12% of them died of exhaustion and disease. In the meantime, the Thessalonikan community, with the help of Athens, managed to gather two billion drachmas towards the sum of 3.5 billion drachmas demanded by the Germans to ransom the forced laborers. The Germans agreed to release them for the lesser sum but, in return, demanded that the Greek authorities abandon the Jewish cemetery of Salonica, containing 300,000 to 500,000 graves. Its size and location, they claimed, had long hampered urban growth.

The Jews transferred land in the periphery on which there were two graves. The municipal authorities, decrying the slow pace of the transfer, took matters into their own hands. Five hundred Greek workers, paid by the municipality, began with the destruction of tombs. The cemetery was soon transformed into a vast quarry where Greeks and Germans sought gravestones for use as construction materials. Today this site is occupied by Aristotle University of Thessaloniki and other buildings.

It is estimated that from the beginning of the occupation to the end of deportations, 3,000–5,000 Jews managed to escape from Salonika, finding temporary refuge in the Italian zone. A recent study by the Jewish Museum of Greece found that 250 Jews of Thessaloniki took part in national resistance movements such as the Greek People's Liberation Army, the National Liberation Front, and British-loyal units of the Greek Army.

=== Destruction of the Jews of Salonika ===
Salonika's 54,000 Jews were shipped to the Nazi extermination camps. More than 90% of the total Jewish population of the city were murdered during the war.

=== Deportation ===
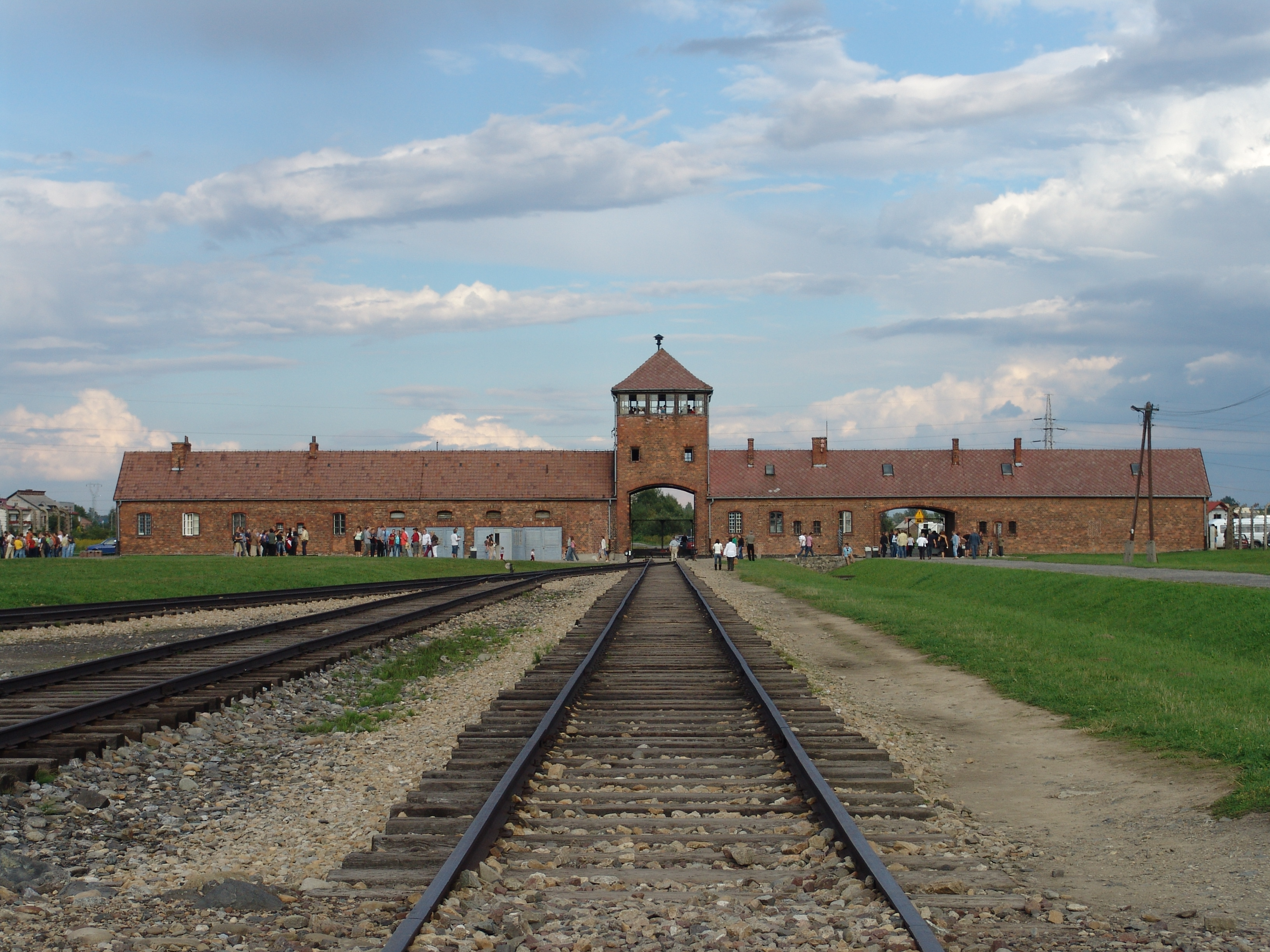
The entrance of Auschwitz II-Birkenau, a view from inside the camp

To carry out this operation, the Nazi authorities dispatched two specialists in the field, Alois Brunner and Dieter Wisliceny, who arrived on February 6, 1943. They immediately applied the Nuremberg laws in all their rigor, imposing the display of the yellow badge and drastically restricting the Jews' freedom of movement. Toward the end of February 1943, they were rounded up in three Nazi ghettos (Kalamaria, Singrou and Vardar / Agia Paraskevi) and then transferred to a transit camp, called the “Baron Hirsch ghetto” or camp, which was adjacent to a train station. There, the death trains were waiting. To accomplish their mission, the SS relied on the Jewish Ghetto Police created for the occasion, led by Vital Hasson, which was the source of numerous abuses against the rest of the Jews.

The first convoy departed on March 15. Each train carried 1000–4000 Jews across the whole of central Europe, mainly to Auschwitz. A total of 48,974 Greek Jews, most from Salonika, would eventually be sent to the camp, where nearly all perished. A convoy of 4,000 Jews also left for Treblinka. It was estimated that 50,000 Salonika Jews had been deported by May 25, 1943. The Jewish population of Salonika was so large that the deportation took several months until it was completed, which occurred on August 7 with the deportation of Chief Rabbi Zvi Koretz and other notables to the Bergen-Belsen concentration camp, under relatively good conditions. In the same convoy were 367 Jews protected by their Spanish nationality, who had a unique destiny: they were transferred from Bergen-Belsen to Barcelona, and then Morocco, with some finally reaching the British Mandate of Palestine.

=== Factors explaining the effectiveness of the deportations ===
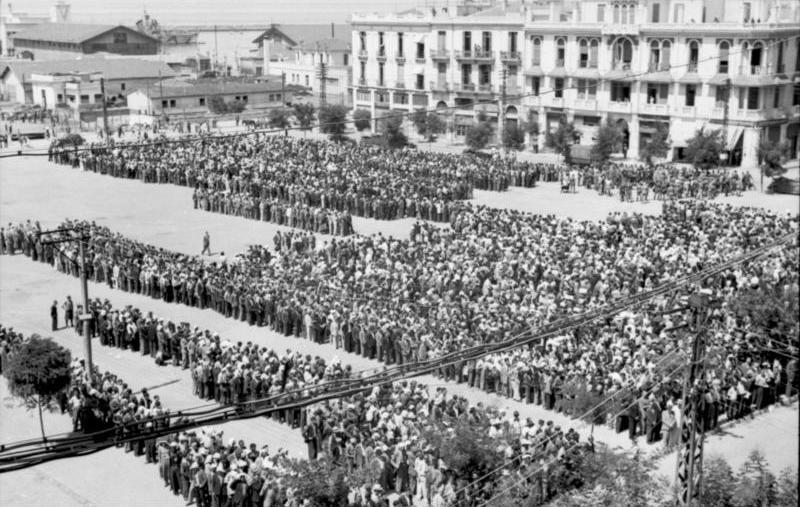
Registration of the Jews of Thessaloniki by the Nazis, July 1942, Eleftherias Square

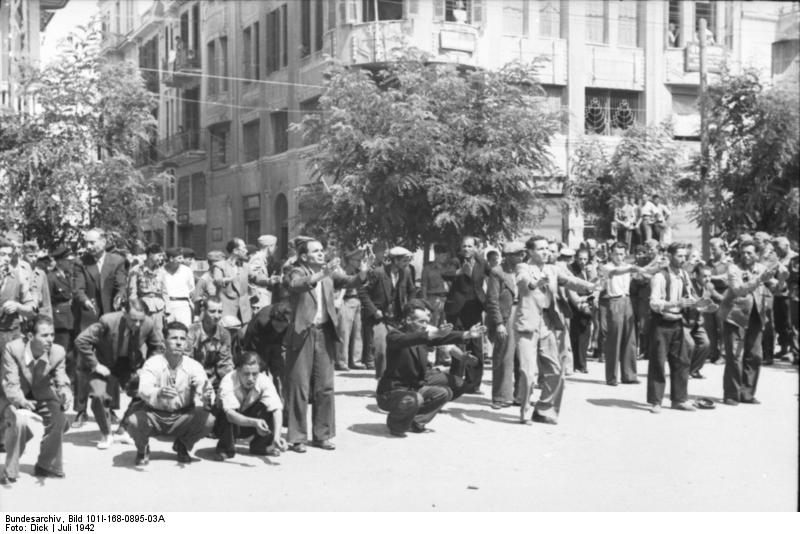
Humiliation of the Jews, Eleftherias Square

Much of the discussion about the reasons for the high percentage of Jewish losses in Thessaloniki have been advanced in contrast to the case of Athens, where a large proportion of Jews managed to escape death. However, this only gives a partial picture as other Jewish communities in Greece with different characteristics, such as Ioannina, Corfu and Rhodes, also experienced very heavy losses.

An often quoted reason focuses on the attitude of the Judenrat, and of its leader in the period prior to the deportations, the chief rabbi Zvi Koretz, has been heavily criticized. He was accused of having responded passively to the Nazis and downplayed the fears of Jews when their transfer to Poland was ordered. As an Austrian citizen and therefore a native German speaker, he was thought to be well-informed. Koretz has also been accused of having knowingly collaborated with the occupiers. However, several new studies tend to diminish his role in the deportations.

Another factor was the solidarity shown by the families who refused to be separated. This desire undermined individual initiatives. Some older Jews also had difficulty remaining in hiding because of their lack of knowledge of the Greek language, which had only become the city's dominant language after annexation by Greece in 1913. Additionally, the large size of the Jewish population rendered impossible the tactic of blending into the Greek Orthodox population, as in Athens.

Again in contrast to Athens, there was also a latent antisemitism among a segment of the Greek population, in particular among the refugees from Asia Minor. When these immigrants arrived en masse in Salonika, they were excluded from the economic system. Consequently, some of these outcasts watched the Jewish population with hostility. The Jewish people were more economically integrated and therefore better off, which the immigrants equated with the former Ottoman power.

A reason that is a lot more plausible is the lack of solidarity from the city's Greek Christian population. Rabbi Molho spoke of only a handful of Greek Christians who saved Jews in Thessaloniki. It is reported that just 10 Jewish families found shelter in the city. This attitude of the local population, which included the Church, the city authorities and the professional associations, has been noted by several historians in the recent years. The resistance was also not very well developed at the time, and few Jews could realistically make the journey to the mountains.

Nevertheless, Yad Vashem has identified 265 Greek righteous among the nations, the same proportion as among the French population.

=== In the camps ===
At Birkenau, about 37,000 Salonicans were gassed immediately, especially women, children and the elderly. Nearly a quarter of all 400 experiments perpetrated on the Jews were on Greek Jews, especially those from Salonika. These experiments included emasculation and implantation of cervical cancer in women. Most of the twins died following atrocious crimes. Others from the community last worked in the camps. In the years 1943–1944, they accounted for a significant proportion of the workforce of Birkenau, making up to 11,000 of the labourers. Because of their unfamiliarity with Yiddish, Jews from Greece were sent to clean up the rubble of the Warsaw Ghetto in August 1943 in order to build a Warsaw concentration camp. Among the 1,000 Salonican Jews employed on the task, a group of twenty managed to escape from the ghetto and join the Polish resistance, the Armia Krajowa, which organized the Warsaw Uprising.

Many Jews from Salonika were also integrated into the Sonderkommandos. On 7 October 1944, they attacked German forces with other Greek Jews, in an uprising planned in advance, storming the crematoria and killing about twenty guards. A bomb was thrown into the furnace of the crematorium III, destroying the building. Before being massacred by the Germans, insurgents sang a song of the Greek partisan movement and the Greek National Anthem.

In his book If This Is a Man, one of the most famous works of literature of the Holocaust, Primo Levi describes the group thus: "those Greeks, motionless and silent as the Sphinx, crouched on the ground behind their thick pot of soup". Those members of the community still alive during 1944 made a strong impression on the author. He noted: "Despite their low numbers their contribution to the overall appearance of the camp and the international jargon is spoken is of prime importance". He described a strong patriotic sense among them, writing that their ability to survive in the camps was partly explained by "they are among the cohesive of the national groups, and from this point of view the most advanced".

== Post-World War II ==
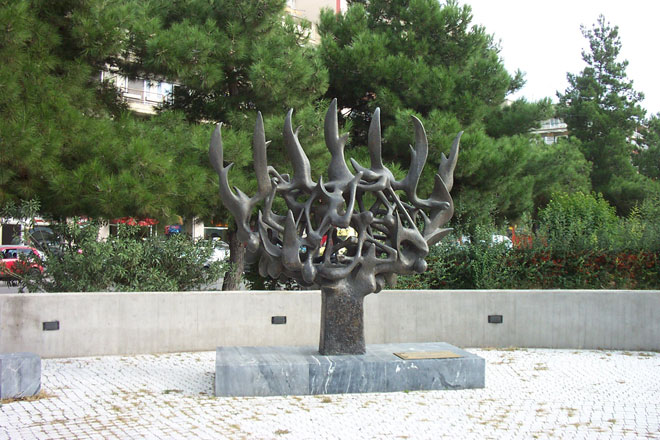
Menorah in flames, Holocaust memorial in Thessaloniki

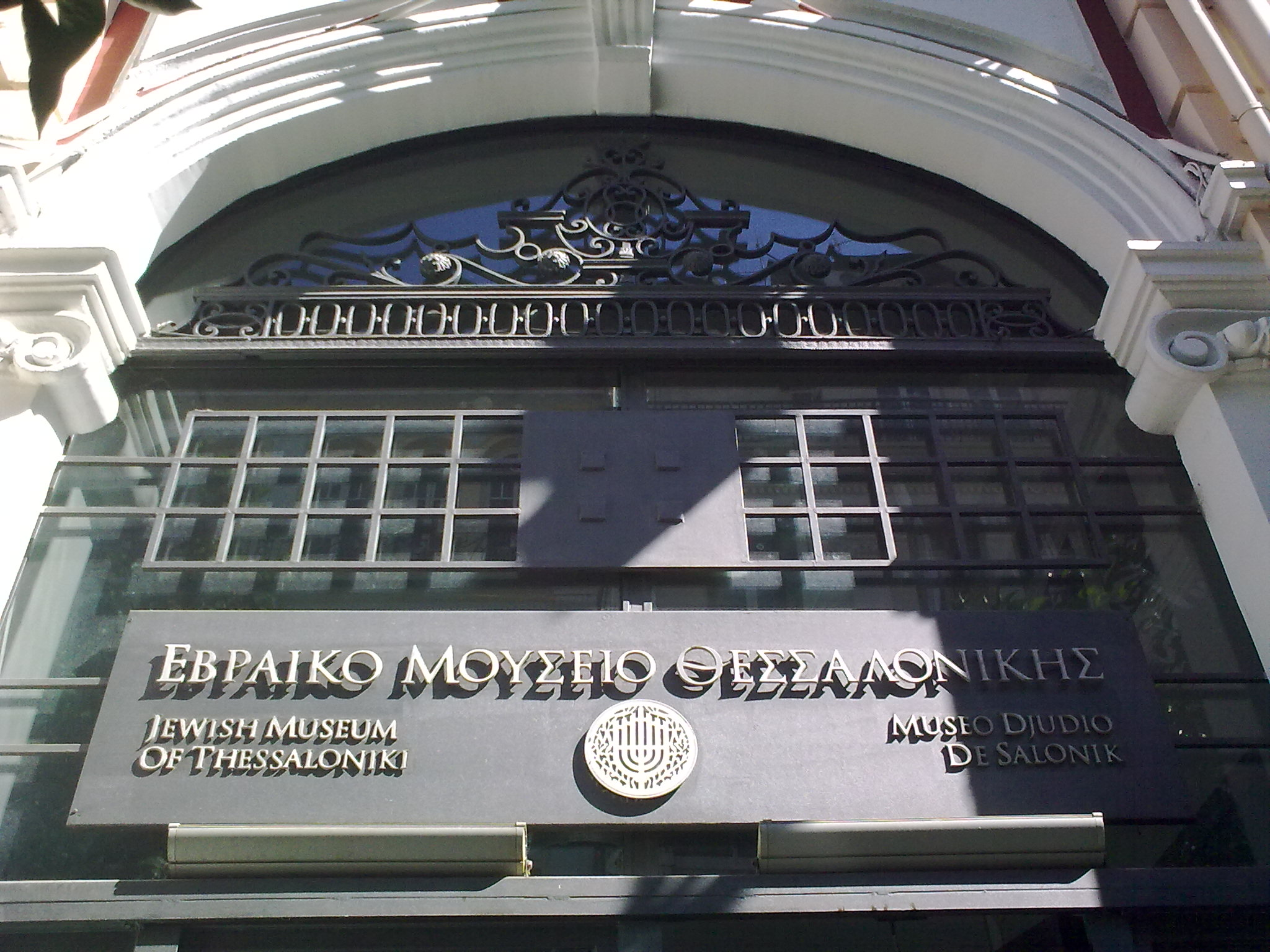
Jewish Museum of Thessaloniki, with signage in Greek, English, and Ladino

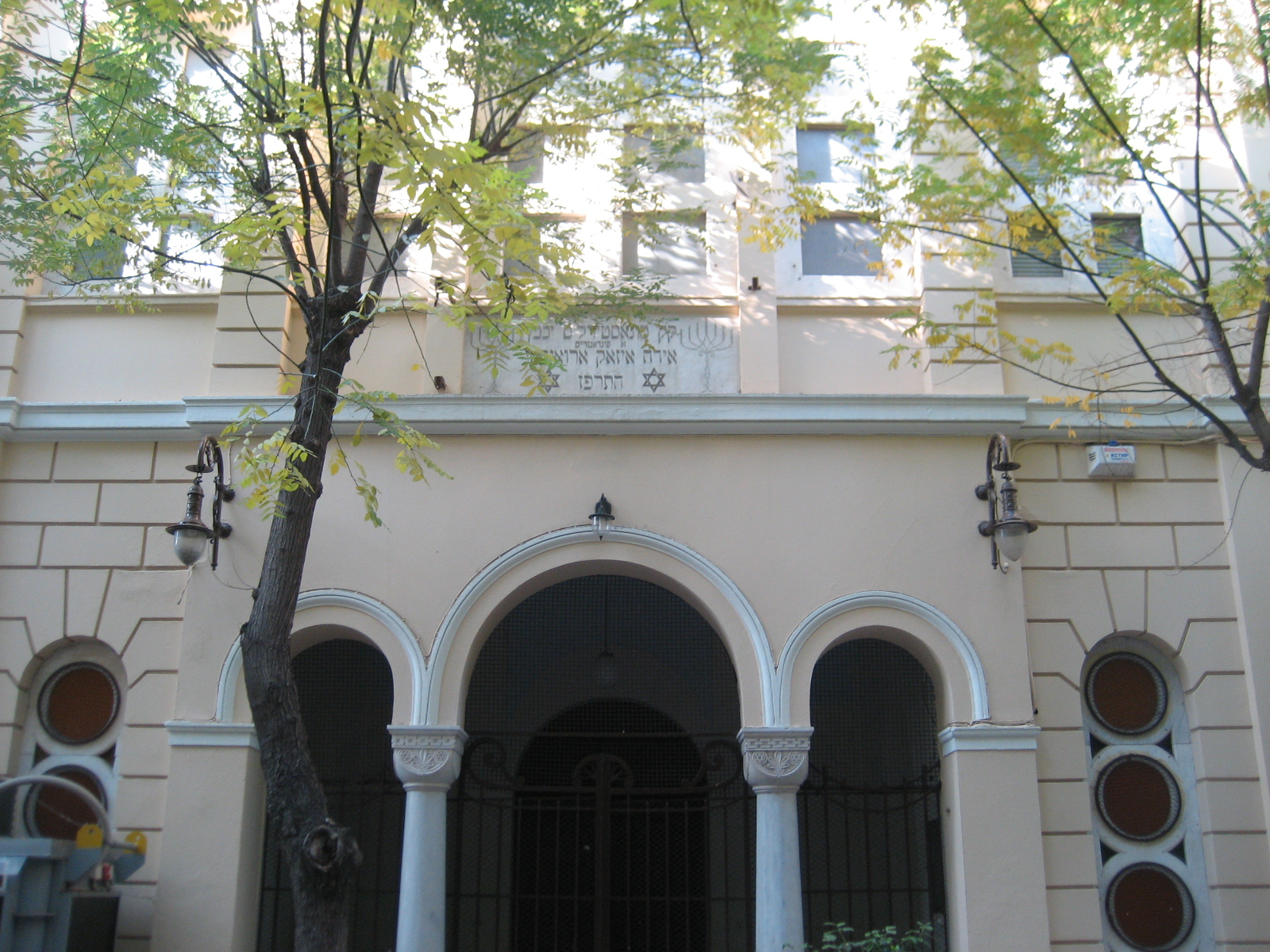
Monastir Synagogue

Interior of Yad LeZikaron Synagogue. The synagogue was opened in 1984, dedicated to the memory of the victims of the Holocaust

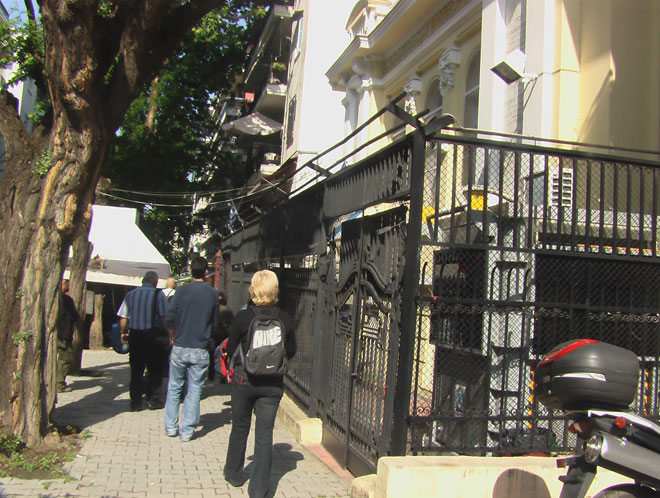
Jewish school entrance

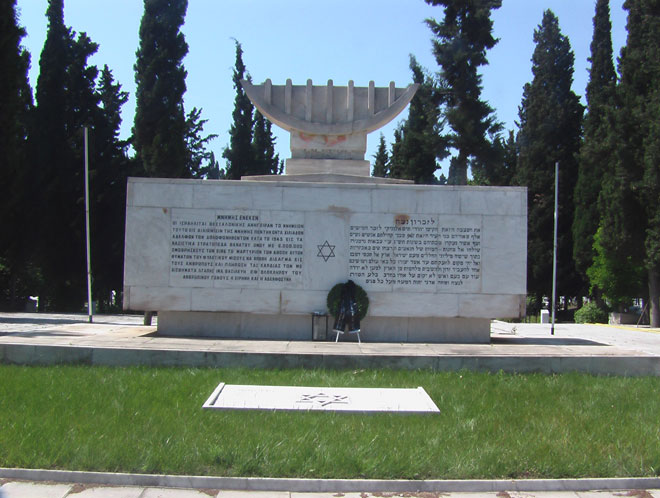
Holocaust memorial in the New Jewish Cemetery

At the end of the Second World War, a violent civil war broke out in Greece. It lasted until 1949, with forces in Athens supported by the British opposition to the powerful communist ELAS. Some of the Jews of Thessaloniki who had escaped deportation took part in it, either on the government or on the opposition side. Among those who fought in the ELAS many were victims, like other supporters, of the repression that fell on the country after the government had regained control of the situation.

Among the few survivors of the camps, some chose to return to Greece and others emigrated to Western Europe, America or the Palestine Mandate. They were all faced with great difficulties in surviving, as both Greece and all Europe were in a chaotic state in the immediate aftermath of war. They also suffered discrimination from some Ashkenazi survivors who cast doubt on their Jewishness.

The return to Thessaloniki was a shock. Returnees were often the sole survivors from their families. They returned to find their homes occupied by Christian families who had purchased them from the Germans. Initially, they were housed in synagogues. A Jewish Committee was formed to identify the number of survivors, and obtained a list from the Bank of Greece of 1,800 houses that had been sold to Christians. The new owners were reluctant to surrender their new dwellings, saying they had legally purchased the houses and that they too had suffered from war. When the war ended, the communist ELAS, which at the time controlled the city, favored the immediate return of Jewish property to its rightful owners. Four months later, when the new British-supported right wing government in Athens came to power in Thessaloniki instead, restitution was cumulatively halted. Not only was the government faced with a major housing crisis due to the influx of refugees caused by war, but a number of individuals who had been enriched during the war were also influential in the new right wing administration, with the government's view favouring strengthening all anticommunist ties by adopting a more conciliatory approach to any former collaborators. The Jewish Agency denounced such policies of the postwar administration, and pleaded for the cause of the Aliyah Jews. The World Jewish Congress also aided the Jews of the city; some of the Jews saved from deportation by Greeks chose to convert to Orthodox Christianity. Some isolated survivors of the camps made the same choice. There were also several marriages among the post-war survivors. One survivor testified:

I returned to a Salonika destroyed. I was hoping to find my adopted brother, but rumor told that he had died of malaria in Lublin. I already knew that my parents had been burned on their first day at the extermination camp of Auschwitz. I was alone. Other prisoners who were with me had nobody either. These days, I am with a young man that I had known in Brussels. We do not separate from each other. We were both survivors of the camps. Shortly after, we married, two refugees who had nothing, there was not even a rabbi to give us the blessing. The director of one of the Jewish schools served as a rabbi and we married, and so I started a new life.

1,783 survivors were listed in the 1951 census.

A monument in Thessaloniki to the tragedy of the deportation, Menorah in flames, was erected in 1997.

In 1998, King Juan Carlos I of Spain went to the city, where he paid tribute to the Sephardic Jews. The visit followed one he had undertaken at the synagogue of Madrid in 1992 to commemorate the expulsion of 1492, at which he condemned the decree of expulsion from Spain.

Following the requests of Professors at the Aristotle University, a memorial to the Jewish cemetery lying beneath the foundations of the institution was unveiled in 2014.

Today, around 1,300 Jews live in Thessaloniki, making it the second largest Jewish community in Greece after Athens.

Israeli singer Yehuda Poliker recorded a song about the deported Jews of Thessaloniki, called 'Wait for me Thessaloniki'.

The community of Thessaloniki accused Germany to repay the manumission payments that the Jews of Greece paid to rescue their family members, after the Nazis demanded this money. Nevertheless, the Nazis did not let them free. The European Court of Justice dismissed this petition.

The Jewish community of Thessaloniki demands from the Deutsche Bahn (the German railway) which is the successor of the Deutsche Reichsbahn to reimburse to heirs of Greek Holocaust victims of Thessaloniki for train fares that they were forced to pay for their deportation from Thessaloniki to Auschwitz and Treblinka between March and August 1943.

The Jewish community of Greece made great efforts to establish a Holocaust Museum in Thessaloniki. A permanent pavilion about the Holocaust of Greek Jews in KZ Auschwitz was to be installed. A Delegation from the Jewish communities of Greece met in November 2016 with Greek politicians and asked them for support in their demand to get back the community archives of the Jewish community of Thessaloniki from Moscow.

The Holocaust Museum of Greece, located near the city's old railway station, is set to open in 2026. The museum's design includes will cover 9,000 square meters with spaces for exhibitions, education, and research. It has received significant funding from the Greek government, Germany, and private donors, including Pfizer CEO Albert Bourla.

== Diaspora ==
Today, there are communities of Salonican Jews found in the United States and Israel that preserve the customs of the Jews of Salonika.

=== Israel ===
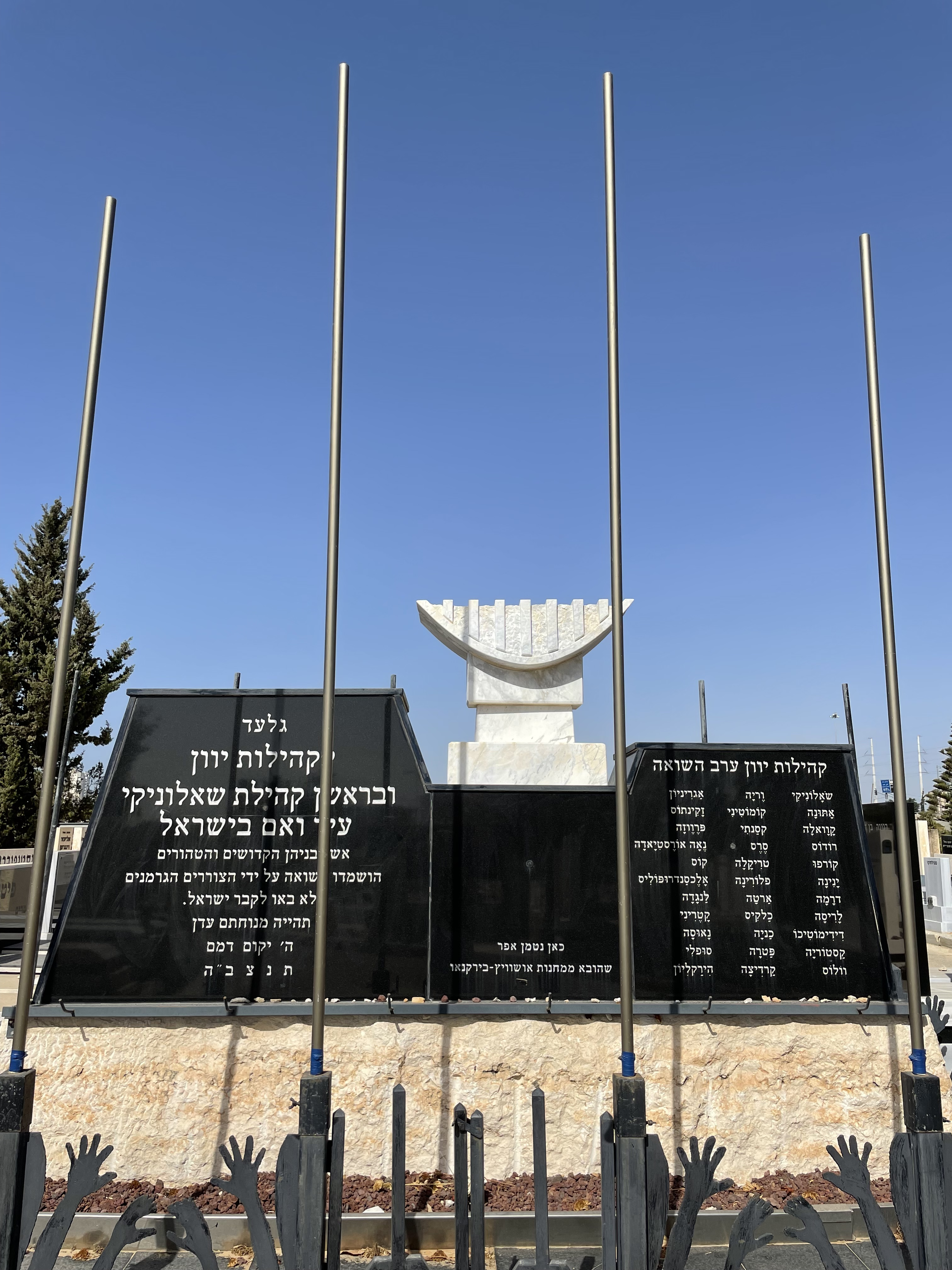
Salonica Holocaust memorial, Holon cemetery, Israel

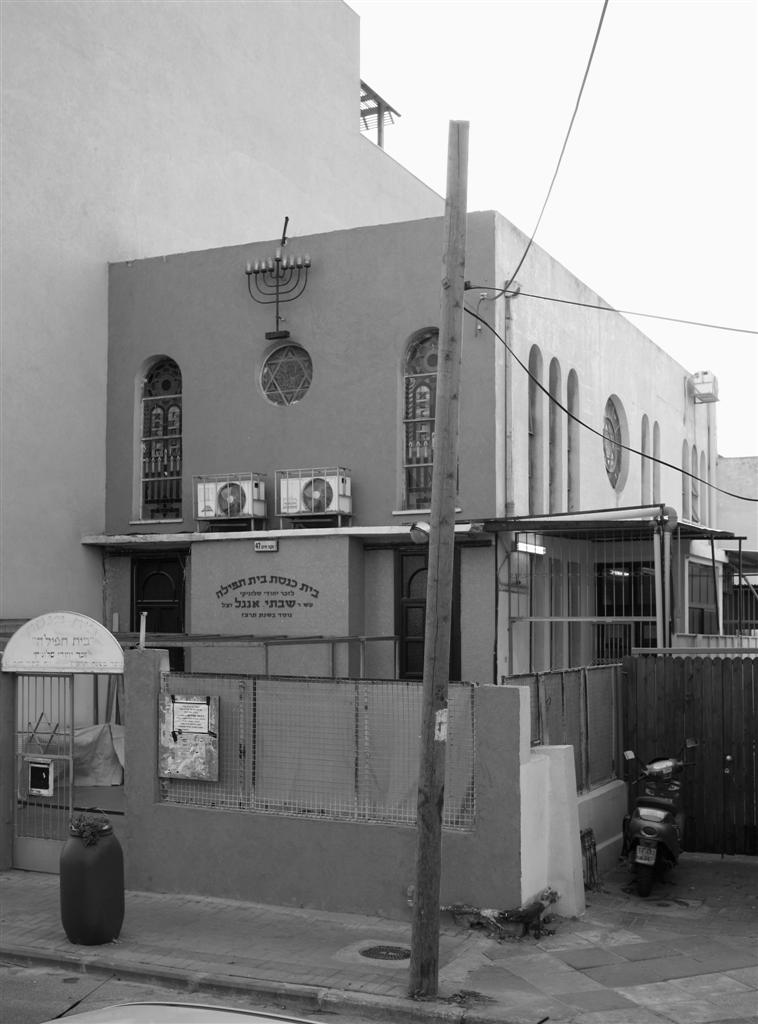
Synagogue prayer in memory of the Jews of Salonika, Shapira neighborhood, Tel Aviv. Founded in 1936

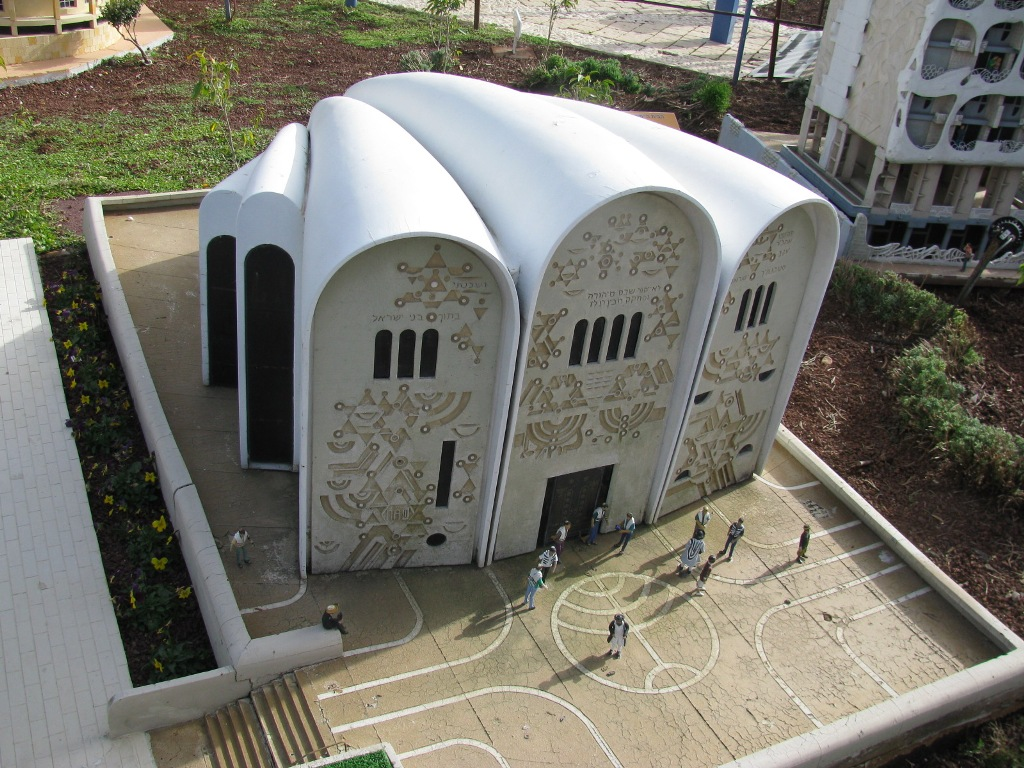
Hechal Yehuda Synagogue. Completed in 1980. Model at Mini Israel.

Hechal Yehuda Synagogue was founded by Jews from Salonika in Tel Aviv. It maintains the customs of Salonikan music and prayer.

=== United States ===
Congregation Etz Ahaim, a Sephardic congregation, was founded in 1921 by Jews from Salonika in New Brunswick, New Jersey. It is now located in Highland Park, New Jersey. The reader chants the Aramaic prayer B'rich Shemei in Ladino before taking out the Torah on Shabbat; it is known as Bendicho su Nombre in Ladino. Additionally, at the end of Shabbat services, the entire congregation sings the well-known Hebrew hymn Ein Keloheinu as Non Como Muestro Dio in Ladino.

Actress and singer Lea Michele was featured in an episode of the show Who Do You Think You Are, where she learned about her Salonican Jewish ancestry. Her family, now living in the United States, is part of the diaspora of Salonican Jews.

=== United Kingdom ===
Prior to World War I Jews from Salonika and Istanbul arrived in London. They settled in west London opening a synagogue in Holland Park in 1928. The community still uses Ladino prayers although very few still speak the language. Over the years they adopted the customs and music of the local Spanish and Portuguese community but on the High Holidays have largely preserved the tunes and liturgy of their forefathers.

== Culture ==
=== Language ===
Generally, Jews who emigrated adopted the language of their new country, but this was not true of the Sepharadim of the Ottoman Empire, who arrived en masse, and retained the use of their language. The Jews of Salonika thus are known to have used Spanish, the Judeo-Spanish (djudezmo), that is neither more nor less than a dialect of Spanish having evolved independently since the 15th century.

They also used Judeo-Catalan, in the case of the Katalanim. Given that the Sephardic communities were larger in population than the Katalanim, despite retaining particularities, over the centuries, the latter were diluted in the former, including the language.

Judeo-Catalan is difficult to trace, but it can be said that in 1526 the majzor of Yamim Noraim, known as Majzor le-núsaj Bartselona minhag Catalunya, was published for the first time, of which it is known that the printing ended on the eve of Yom Kippur in the year 5287. The katalanim published several reprints of the majzor in the 19th century. In 1863 they printed an edition entitled Majzor le-Rosh ha-Shaná ve-Yom ha-Kippurim ke-minhag qahal qadosh Qatalà yashán ve-jadash asher be-irenu zot Saloniqi. This edition was published by Yitsjaq Amariliyo. In 1869 the Majzor ke-minhag qahal qadosh Qatalán yashán ve-jadash was printed, the editors were: Moshé Yaaqov Ayash and Rabbi Janoj Pipano, and those who carried out the printing were: David, called Bejor Yosef Arditi, Seadi Avraham Shealt. The majzor was published under the title Majzor le-Rosh ha-Shana kefí minhag Sefarad ba-qehilot ha-qedoshot Saloniqi, and includes the prayers of the Aragon community and the Qatalán yashán ve-jadash communities. The Catalan Jewish community of Salonica existed as such until the Holocaust. In 1927 the community published a numbered three-volume edition of the majzor entitled Majzor le-Yamim Noraim kefí minhag q[ahal] q[adosh] Qatalán, ha-yadua be-shem núsaj Bartselona minhag Qatalunya. In the second volume Tefilat Yaaqov, there is a long historical introduction about the Catalan Jewish community and the edition of the majzor written in Judeo-Spanish.

Anyway, they prayed and studied in Hebrew and Aramaic and used, as do all other Sephardic communities, what Haïm Vidal Séphiha called the language "layer", Ladino, which consisted of a Hebrew translation of texts into a Spanish respecting a Hebrew word order and syntax. These two languages, djudezmo and Ladino, were written in Hebrew characters as well as Latin characters. In addition to these languages that had evolved in exile, the Jews of Salonika sometimes spoke Turkish, the language of the Ottoman Empire, written in Arabic characters. The haskala taught by the French Jews has, in turn, encouraged teaching the French language in Alliance Israélite Universelle schools. Italian is also taught to a lesser extent. After the Greeks took Salonika in 1912, Greek was taught at school and has been spoken by several generations of Jewish Salonicans. Today it is the language that predominates among Thessalonian Jews.

Modern Salonican djudezmo now include phrases from various other immigrant groups including Italian. French phrases have also become popular to the point that Prof. Haïm-Vidal Séphiha speaks of "judéo-fragnol."

Some Jewish family surnames of the past or present include: Allatini, Arouch, Carasso, Cohen, Florentin, Kapon, Levy, Mallah, Modiano, Nahmias, Salem, Saltiel, Sason, Zacharia, while of Spanish origin are the: Algaba, Benrubi, Beraha, Buenaventura, Cuenca, Curiel, Errera, Molcho, Navarro, Saporta, Saragussi, Ventura etc.

=== Music ===
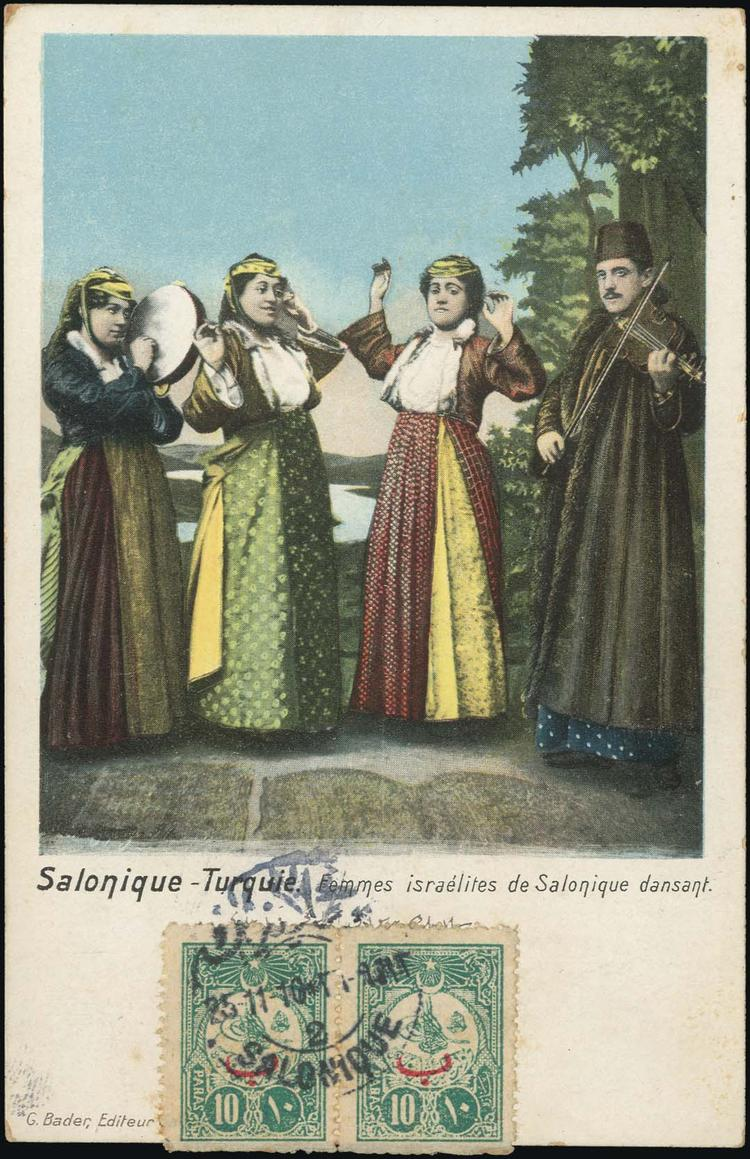
Jewish women dancing postcard

The Jews of the city, and especially the Sephardis, had a long and notable musical tradition with its roots in the medieval Andalusia. Nowadays, artists like Françoise Atlan, Yasmin Levy, David Saltiel and Savina Yannatou make efforts for its revival.

=== Cuisine ===
The sociologist Edgar Morin said that the core of every culture is its cuisine, and that this applies especially to the Jews of Salonika, the community from which he descends.

The cuisine of the Jews of the city was a variant of the Judeo-Spanish cuisine, which is itself influenced by the large ensemble of Mediterranean cuisine. It was influenced by the Jewish dietary rules of kashrut, which include prohibitions on the consumption of pork and mixtures of dairy and meat products, and religious holidays that require the preparation of special dishes. However, its key feature was its Iberian influence. Fish, abundant in this port city, was consumed in large quantities and in all forms: fried, baked ("al orno"), marinated or braised ("abafado"), and was often accompanied by complex sauces. Seen as a symbol of fertility, fish was used in a marriage rite called dia del peche ("day of fish") on the last day of wedding ceremonies, in which the bride stepped over a large dish of fish that was then consumed by the guests. Vegetables accompanied all the dishes, especially onions; garlic was on hand but was not used, since the Ashkenazic synagogues were major consumers of garlic and had been given the nickname "El kal del ajo," "the garlic synagogue." Greek yogurt, widely consumed in the Balkans and Anatolia, was also appreciated, as well as cream and Pan di Spagna.

In anticipation of Shabbat, hamin was prepared. A Judeo-Spanish variant of the Ashkenazi cholent and the North African dafina, chamin was a meat stew with vegetables (wheat, chickpeas, white beans) that were let simmer until the Saturday midday meal. In preparation for Passover, housewives filled locked chests with sweets, figs and dates stuffed with almonds, marzipan and the popular chape blanche (white jam), which consisted of sugar water and lemon. Wine was reserved for religious rituals, but Sephardim, like their Greek and Muslim neighbors, were major consumers of raki. They also favored sugary drinks made of prune, cherry and apricot syrup, which they drank at the end of the large festive meal.

== Notable Thessalonian Jews ==
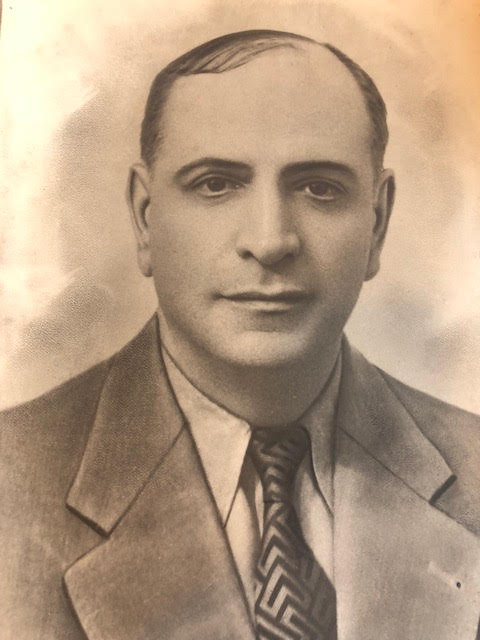
Leon Yehuda Recanati

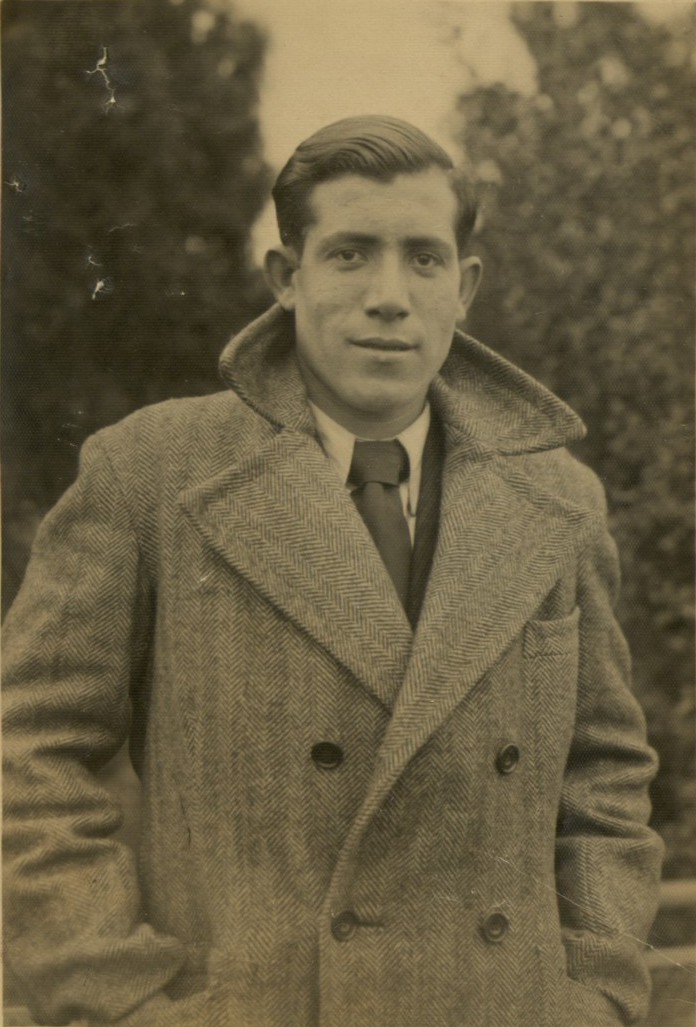
Alberto Errera

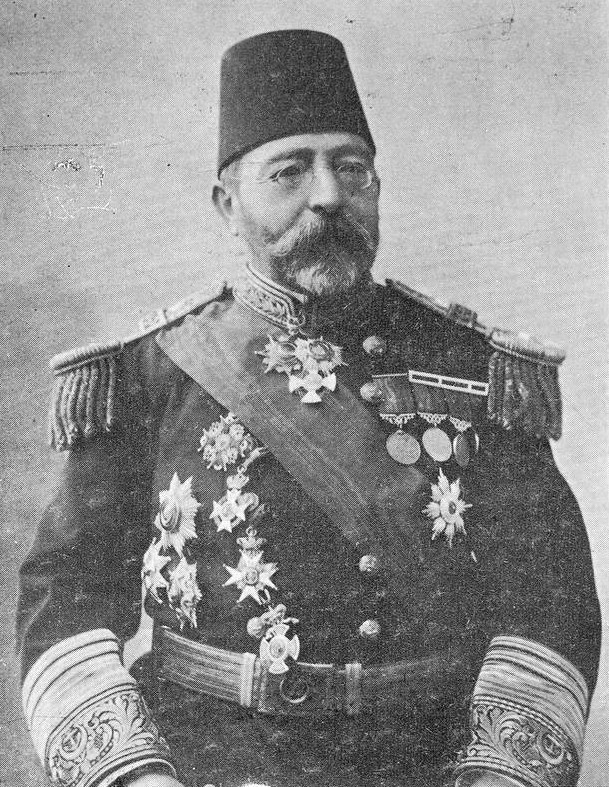
Isaac Molho Pasha, the Sultan's doctor

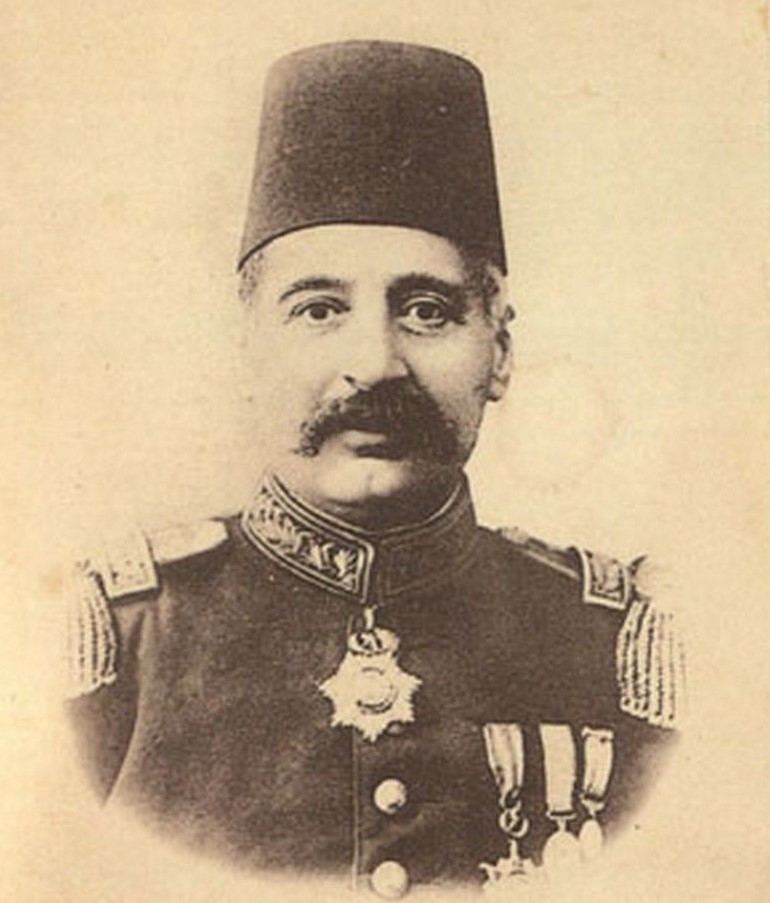
Jacques Nissim Pasha

- Aaron Abiob, rabbi
- Alberto Abravanel, father of Senor Abravanel (aka Silvio Santos) and descendant of Isaac Abarbanel
- Maurice Abravanel, conductor of classical music
- Shlomo Halevi Alkabetz, rabbi
- Moïse Allatini, founder of Allatini (company)/Allatini Mills
- Charles Allatini, banker and trader
- Eric Allatini, writer, killed in Auschwitz
- Moses Almosnino, rabbi
- Saul Amarel, pioneer of artificial intelligence
- Salamo Arouch, boxer of Maccabi Thessaloniki and Aris Thessaloniki
- Hank Azaria, American actor
- Isaac Benrubi, philosopher
- Albert Bourla, CEO of Pfizer
- Emmanuel Carasso, lawyer and a prominent member of the Young Turks
- Isaac Carasso, started a yogurt factory which later became Groupe Danone
- Daniel Carasso
- Alberto Couriel, socialist politician and Member of the Hellenic Parliament with Federation
- Alberto Errera, Greek Army officer, ELAS fighter, Holocaust victim
- David Florentin, journalist and one of the founders of the Zionist movement in Thessaloniki
- Salomon Jacob Florentin, contractor and entrepreneur who founded the Florentin neighborhood in Tel Aviv
- Allegra Gategno, prewar woman sprinter of G.S. Iraklis Thessaloniki
- Haim Habib, second-to-last Chief Rabbi of Thessaloniki, killed in Auschwitz
- Stella Haskil (Gechaskél), rebetiko singer
- Moshe Ha-Elion, Holocaust survivor and writer
- Moshe Levy, chemist
- Samuel de Medina, rabbi, talmudist and author
- David ben Judah Messer Leon, rabbi and physician
- Mordechai Mano, businessman and member of the Mano shipping family
- Eli Modiano, architect
- Jacob Modiano, banker
- Saul David Modiano, founder of Modiano company
- Saul Isaac Modiano, banker and philanthropist
- Isaac Molho Pasha, Sultan Abdul Hamid II's doctor and vice admiral of the Ottoman navy
- Alberto Nahmias, football player
- Jacques Nissim Pasha, military doctor and division general of the Ottoman army
- David Pardo, Dutch rabbi, born in Salonika
- Joseph Pardo, rabbi
- Avraham Rakanti, politician and journalist
- Leon Yehuda Recanati, banker, founder of the Israel Discount Bank
- Raphael Recanati, businessman, banker, and philanthropist. Founder and chairman of the Overseas Shipholding Group
- Raphaël Salem, mathematician
- Hayyim Shabbethai, Chief Rabbi of Thessaloniki
- Solomon Sirilio, rabbi and Talmud commentator
- Hayyim Saruq, trader and diplomat
- Jacques Stroumsa, Holocaust survivor and musician
- Joseph Taitazak, talmudist
- Baruch Uziel, Israeli politician
- Robi-Rafael Varsano, Holocaust survivor who, after WWII, detected Max Merten, military administration counselor of Nazi Germany in Thessaloniki
- Shlomo Venezia (1923-2012), Holocaust survivor
- Morris Venezia, alias Maurice Venezia, (1921-2013), Holocaust survivor

== See also ==
- Sephardi Jews
- Romaniote Jews
- Holocaust Museum of Greece
- History of Thessaloniki
- History of the Jews in Greece
- History of the Jews in Turkey
- Guelfo Zamboni (1897–1994)
- Maccabi Thessaloniki
- Florentin, Tel Aviv
- Conspiracy theories in Turkey

== Bibliography ==
- Giorgios Antoniou, A. Dirk Moses (2018). The Holocaust in Greece. Cambridge University. ISBN 978-1-108-47467-2.
- Hacker, Joseph R. (2017). "The Rise of Ottoman Jewry". In Karp, Jonathan; Sutcliffe, Adam (eds.). The Early Modern World, 1500-1815. The Cambridge History of Judaism. Vol. 7. Cambridge: Cambridge University Press. pp. 77–112. doi:10.1017/9781139017169.005. ISBN 9781139017169.
- Mazower, Mark (2005). Salonica, City of Ghosts: Christians, Muslims and Jews, 1430–1950. New York: Vintage Books. ISBN 978-0-375-41298-1.
- Trigano, Shmuel (2006). Le Monde sépharade. Paris: Seuil. ISBN 978-2-02-090439-1.
- Veinstein, Gilles (1992). Salonique 1850–1918, la "ville des Juifs" et le réveil des Balkans. Paris. ISBN 978-2-86260-356-8.
