= Sándor Bortnyik =

Hungarian painter and graphic designer

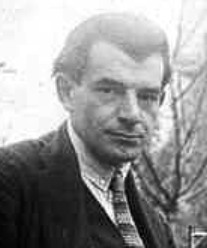
Bortnyik Sándor

Sándor Bortnyik (July 3, 1893 – December 31, 1976) was a Hungarian painter and graphic designer. His work was greatly influenced by Cubism, Expressionism and Constructivism.

== Life ==
Born in Marosvásárhely, Transylvania, Kingdom of Hungary (today Târgu Mureș, Romania), he moved to Weimar in 1922 and was connected to the Bauhaus. When he moved back to Hungary he founded an art school (Workshop) in Budapest, where he followed Bauhaus principles.

Bortnyik is well known for his commercial posters. During his long career he worked for many Hungarian and international clients. The most famous works are the advertising images for Modiano cigarette papers.

He was also the director of the Hungarian University of Fine Arts (1949–1956).

He is buried in Kerepesi Cemetery.

== See also ==
- The New Adam
