= Salamo Arouch =

Greek-Israeli boxer and Holocaust survivor (1923–2009)

Salamo Arouch Σολομόν Αρούχ סלמו ארוך

Personal information
- Nickname: "The Ballet Dancer"
- Nationality: Greek; Israeli
- Born: 1 January 1923 Thessaloniki, Kingdom of Greece
- Died: 26 April 2009 (aged 86) Tel Aviv, Israel
- Height: 5 ft 6 in (1.68 m)
- Weight: Lightweight, welterweight, middleweight

Boxing career
- Stance: Southpaw

Salamo Arouch (Greek: Σολομόν Αρούχ; Hebrew: סלמו ארוך; 1 January 1923 – 26 April 2009) was a Greek-Israeli boxer and Holocaust survivor. The Middleweight Champion of Greece in 1938 and the All-Balkans Middleweight Champion in 1939, his career was cut short due to the outbreak of World War II in the following year. During the Axis occupation of Greece, Arouch, along with his entire family, was deported to German-occupied Poland, where he was interned at the Auschwitz concentration camp. There, he survived the Holocaust by being made to engage in makeshift boxing (over 200 bouts) with his fellow prisoners for the entertainment of German military officers. His story was the subject of the 1989 film Triumph of the Spirit, in which he was portrayed by the American actor Willem Dafoe.

== Biography ==
=== Early life and boxing career ===
Salamo Arouch was born in 1923 in Thessaloniki, Greece, one of two sons in a family that also included three daughters. His father was a stevedore who nurtured his son's interest in boxing, teaching him when he was a child. He worked briefly with his father as a stevedore. Arouch said that when he was 14, he fought and won his first amateur boxing match in 1937 in Maccabi Thessaloniki, a Jewish youth center and gymnasium. He also fought with the colors of Aris Thessaloniki. He won the Greek Middleweight Boxing Championship, and in 1939, won the All-Balkans Middleweight Championship, an achievement he was best known for. After compiling an undefeated record of 24 wins (24 knockouts), Arouch was drafted into the Greek Army. He became a member of Greek Army's boxing team, winning three fights by knockout.

=== World War II and Axis invasion of Greece ===
==== Deportation to Auschwitz-Birkenau and coerced boxing ====
In 1943, Arouch and his family were transported by boxcar and interned in German Nazi Auschwitz-Birkenau concentration camp in present-day Poland. They arrived on May 15, 1943. In Auschwitz, where Arouch was tagged prisoner 136954, he said the commander sought boxers among the newly interned and, once assured of Arouch's abilities, set him to twice- or thrice-weekly boxing matches against other prisoners.

According to Arouch, he was undefeated at Auschwitz, though two matches he was forced to fight while recovering from dysentery ended in draws. Lodged with the other fighters forced to participate in these matches and paid in extra food or lighter work, Salamo fought 208 matches in his estimation, knowing that prisoners who lost would be sent to the gas chamber or shot. Fights generally lasted until one fighter went down or the Nazis got tired of watching. Arouch claimed he weighed about 135 pounds and often fought much larger men. Once, he finished off a 250-pound opponent in only 18 seconds.

==== Transfer to Bergen-Belsen and liberation by the Allies ====
Though Arouch survived the war, being released from Auschwitz on January 17, 1945, his parents and siblings did not. In 1945, he was transferred to Bergen-Belsen, where he worked performing slave labour until the allies liberated the camp.

=== After the Holocaust ===
==== Search for surviving family and immigration to Israel ====
During a search for family at Bergen-Belsen concentration camp in April, 1945, he met Marta Yechiel, a 17-year-old survivor from his own hometown.

With Yechiel, he immigrated to Israel and settled in Tel Aviv, where he managed a shipping firm. Arouch and Yechiel wed in November 1945 and raised a family of four.

After the war he gave inspirational speeches. Arouch's undefeated boxing record (1937–1955) ended on June 8, 1955, when he was knocked out in four rounds by Italy's Amleto Falcinelli in Tel Aviv.

==== Work on Triumph of the Spirit (1989) ====
Arouch was a consultant on the movie, Triumph of the Spirit, the 1989 dramatic re-enactment of his early life. He accompanied filmmakers several times on an emotional return to the concentration camp where large portions of the film were actually produced. The film takes some artistic liberties with the biographical details of his life, including the renaming of his wife and placing her in his story prior to internment.

After the movie came out, another Jewish boxer from Salonika and former teammate at Maccabi Thessaloniki, Jacques "Jacko" Razon, sued Arouch and the filmmakers for more than $20 million claiming that they had stolen his story and that Arouch had exaggerated his exploits. The case was later settled for US$30,000.

Arouch lived in Tel Aviv, Bat Yam, and Rishon LeZion and died on April 26, 2009. He had been weakened by a stroke he suffered around 1994 and had been in declining health for six months prior to his death.

== Boxing record (career highlights) ==
Result	Record	Opponent	Method	Date	Round	Time	Event	Location	Notes
Loss		Amleto Falcinelli	K.O.	1955 June 8	4			Tel Aviv, Israel	
Win		Klaus Silber	K.O.	1944	1			Auschwitz-Birkenau, German-occupied Poland	
Win		Unknown Pole	K.O.	1943 March	1			Auschwitz-Birkenau, German-occupied Poland	
Win		Unknown Czechoslovak	K.O.	1943 March	1	0:18		Auschwitz-Birkenau, German-occupied Poland	
Win		Chaim	K.O.	1943 March	3			Auschwitz-Birkenau, German-occupied Poland	
Win		Artino	K.O.	1939	2			Thessalonica, Greece	
Win		Papadopoulos	K.O.	1939	1			Thessalonica, Greece	
Win		Anagnos	K.O.	1937	1			Thessalonica, Greece	
Win		Christodoulou	K.O.	1937	1			Thessalonica, Greece	
Win		Thouvenin	K.O.	1937	1			Thessalonica, Greece	

== See also ==
- List of Jewish athletes
- Sports in Israel
