= Max Merten =

Nazi German military officer and war criminal

Max Merten (8 September 1911, Berlin-Lichterfelde – 21 September 1971, West Berlin) was the Kriegsverwaltungsrat (military administration counselor) of the Nazi German occupation forces in Thessaloniki in northern Greece during World War II. He was responsible among other crimes for the deportation of c. 50,000 Jews of the city as part of the Holocaust.

He was arrested during a visit to Greece in 1959, which caused a political scandal, the "Merten Affair" (Greek: Υπόθεση Μέρτεν). He was convicted in Greece and sentenced to a 25-year term as a war criminal. After a short, two-year imprisonment, political pressure by West Germany and personal intervention by Chancellor Adenauer, led to his extradition to his homeland, where he was set free.

According to Spiliotis, the handling of the Merten case was defined by both Greek and German political and economic interests, as was the question of war crimes in postwar Greek-German relations in general.

On 28 September 1960 the West German newspapers Hamburger Echo and Der Spiegel published excerpts of Merten's deposition to the German authorities, where Merten claimed that the Greek Prime Minister Konstantinos Karamanlis was an informer during the Nazi occupation of Greece. These statements caused a reaction by the leader of the opposition, Georgios Papandreou, and the Greek Left against Karamanlis.

Karamanlis rejected the claims as unsubstantiated and absurd. Merten's accusations against Karamanlis were never corroborated in a court of law.

== Literature ==
- Gerrit Hamann: Die Rosenburg und der Kriegsverbrecher: Der Fall Max Merten, in: Gerd J. Nettersheim/Doron Kiesel (Hrsg.): Das Bundesministerium der Justiz und die NS-Vergangenheit. Bewertungen und Perspektiven, Göttingen 2021, S. 123–152, ISBN 978-3-666-35218-8, doi:10.13109/9783666352188.
- Gerrit Hamann: Max Merten. Jurist und Kriegsverbrecher. Eine biografische Fallstudie zum Umgang mit NS-Tätern in der frühen Bundesrepublik, Göttingen 2022, ISBN 978-3-525-35224-3, doi:10.13109/9783666352249.
