= The New Adam =

1924 painting by Sándor Bortnyik

- Az új Ádám (Hungarian)
- Artist: Sándor Bortnyik
- Year: 1924
- Medium: oil on canvas
- Dimensions: 48.3 cm × 38 cm (19.0 in × 15 in)
- Location: Hungarian National Museum; Budapest

The New Adam (Hungarian: Az új Ádám) is a 1924 painting by the Hungarian artist Sándor Bortnyik.

It is an oil on canvas and measures 48.3 × 38 cm. It is part of the collection of the Hungarian National Museum in Budapest.

== Analysis ==
Sándor Bortnyik falls among the representatives of Constructivism. From 1922 to 1924, he lived in Weimar, where he met artists from the Bauhaus. He painted abstract two- and three-dimensional compositions, to which he subsequently added figures and objects. In the composition The New Adam he describes an ironic ideal of "modern" man in the 1920s. It shows an extremely fashion-conscious man who is fragile, like clockwork. With this and other paintings, Bortnyik ironically applied the "brave new world" of constructivism. The artist uses precise details, geometric shapes and colors in abstract composition. He manages to satirize utopian ideals, but cannot avoid them because he is an active participant in the formation of a "new world“.
