= Yad LeZikaron Synagogue =

Orthodox synagogue in Thessaloniki, Greece

- Hebrew: "קהל קדוש "יד לזכרון
- Interior of synagogue, in 2022

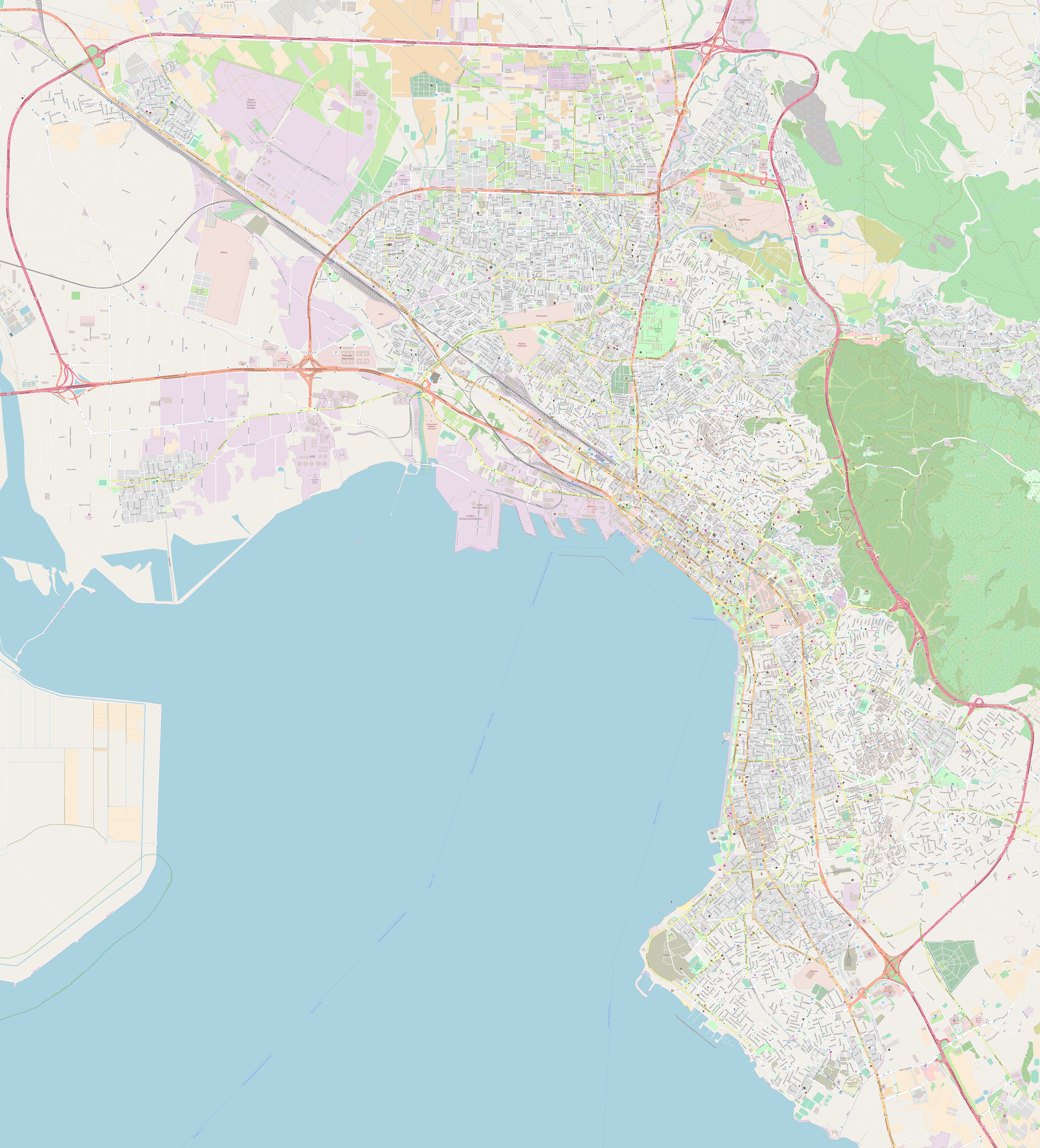
- Location of synagogue in Thessaloniki

Religion
- Affiliation: Orthodox Judaism
- Ecclesiastical or organizational status: Synagogue
- Status: Active

Location
- Location: Vasileos Irakleiou 26, Thessaloniki
- Country: Greece
- Interactive map of Yad LeZikaron Synagogue
- Coordinates: 40°38′04″N 22°56′29″E

Architecture
- Architects: N/A (1927); Elias Messinas and KARD Architects (2015)
- Type: Synagogue architecture
- Completed: 1984

The Yad LeZikaron Synagogue (Hebrew: "קהל קדוש "יד לזכרון; Judaeo-Spanish: Kal Yad LeZikaron; Greek: Συναγωγή "Γιάδ Λεζικαρόν"), also known as Burla or Kal de la Plasa is an Orthodox Jewish congregation and synagogue of the Jewish community in Thessaloniki, Greece. The synagogue was opened in 1984, dedicated to the memory of the victims of the Holocaust.

== History ==
The synagogue is dedicated to the Salonikan victims of the Holocaust. It is housed in a sizable new structure that replaces an earlier synagogue owned by the Bourla family, which was functioning since 1921 and was destroyed in an earthquake in 1978.

The tebah in the new synagogue is from the Baron Hirsch Synagogue, which is named after the Jewish philanthropist Maurice de Hirsch, while the hechal (Torah ark) is from the old Kal Sarfati, the French synagogue. The upper floor of the synagogue also serves as the headquarters of the Jewish community of Thessaloniki.

== Plaques ==
The names of all the synagogues known to have existed in Thessaloniki, including those from before the Great fire of 1917 and those in use during the interwar years of the 1920s and 1930s, are listed in six tall, narrow inscriptions on one side wall of the synagogue sanctuary (12 names per inscription). This memorial list a part of the 2015 sanctuary renovation conducted by Elias Messinas and KARD Architects.
