= Maccabi Thessaloniki =

Multi-sport club in Thessaloniki, Greece

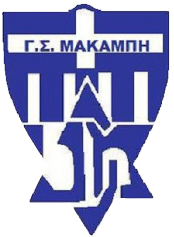
- Full name: Gymnastikos Syllogos Maccabi
- Founded: 1908
- Colours: Blue, White
- Website: https://www.maccabi.gr/

Maccabi Thessaloniki is a multi-sport club in the city of Thessaloniki, historically representing the Jewish community of the city. It maintains or maintained departments of football, basketball, volleyball, athletics, Olympic weightlifting, table tennis, boxing, cycling, and chess. Its colours are blue and white.

== History ==
Maccabi Thessaloniki was founded in 1908 by members of the Jewish community. From 1930, it started participating also in the Maccabiah Games (Maccabiah).

Significant athletes were members of the boxing department, which was the only department which had non-Jewish athletes before World War II. Athletes like Dinos Ouziel, Jacob Razon and the great Salamo Arouch.

After the Holocaust, the function of the club stopped. It started again in 1966 and continues until today, with members of any religious faith.
