= Aaron Abiob =

Turkish rabbi (1535–1605)

Personal life
- Born: 1535
- Died: 1605 (aged 69–70)

Religious life
- Religion: Judaism

Aaron Abiob (Hebrew: אהרן אביוב) (1535–1605) was a Turkish rabbi of Salonica. He was the author of Oil of Myrrh, in the Yiddish known as Shemen ha-Mor (ex ravvinorum Myrrhoe commentariis Oleum), and was commentary on the Book of Esther. He lived and flourished in Salonica about 1540' his work being first printed in 1601, and living for some time in Constantinople.

The name Aaron was given to the brother of Moses a person documented within the Torah, this biblical Aaron was the founder of the priesthood.

== See also ==
- History of the Jews in Thessaloniki
