= Hayyim Saruq =

Hayyim Saruq was probably born sometime in the early sixteenth century in, or around Thessaloniki (Salonica) in Greece. Little has been produced regarding his life until recently as some Jewish historians have taken up the task of writing about his significance during his life. Hayyim Saruq played an active role between different polities in the Levant as well as Italy, and as a merchant helped in the readmission of Jews into Venice. A book by Benjamin Arbel, Trading Nations: Jews and Venetians in the Early Modern Eastern Mediterranean, refers to him in a couple of chapters discussing his significance throughout the region.

== See also ==
- History of the Jews in Turkey
- History of the Jews in Italy
