= Modiano (company) =

Italian playing cards manufacturer

- Headquarters: San Dorligo della Valle
- Number of employees: 70 (2021)

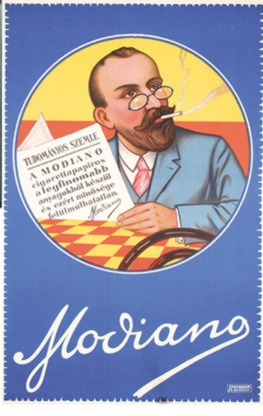
Old packaging of Modiano cigarette papers

Modiano (founded in 1868) is an Italian brand of playing cards. The company was founded by Saul David Modiano in Trieste and initially manufactured cigarette papers. In 1884, it diversified into lithographic printing, including playing cards. In 1987 the company was taken over by the Grafad group, though the Modiano brand is still in use for playing cards and games equipment.

In the 1930s Modiano's advertising posters were created by artists including Sándor Bortnyik and these are now reproduced for sale.
