= Stein =

Stein may refer to:

== Places ==
=== Austria ===
- Stein, a neighbourhood of Krems an der Donau, Lower Austria
- Stein, Styria, a municipality in the district of Fürstenfeld, Styria
- Stein (Lassing), a village in the district of Liezen, Styria
- Stein an der Enns, a village in the district of Liezen, Styria

=== Canada ===
- Stein River, a tributary of the Fraser River, from the Nlaka'pamux language Stagyn, meaning "hidden place"
  - Stein Valley Nlaka'pamux Heritage Park, a British Columbia provincial park comprising the basin of that river
  - Stein Mountain, a mountain in the Lillooet Ranges named for the river
  - Stein Lake, a lake in the upper reaches of the Stein River basin

=== Germany ===
- Stein, Bavaria, a town in the district of Fürth, Bavaria
- Stein, Schleswig-Holstein, a municipality in the district of Plön, Schleswig-Holstein
- Stein (Kochel am See), a mountain in Bavaria
- Stein an der Traun, a village in Upper Bavaria, part of the town of Traunreut
- Stein-Bockenheim, a municipality in the district Alzey-Worms, Rhineland-Palatinate
- Stein-Neukirch, a municipality in the district Westerwaldkreis, Rhineland-Palatinate
- Stein-Wingert, a municipality in the district Westerwaldkreis, Rhineland-Palatinate

=== Netherlands ===
- Stein, Limburg, a municipality and town
- Stein, South Holland, a small village in the municipality of Krimpenerwaard

=== Switzerland ===
- Stein, Aargau
- Stein, Appenzell in the canton of Appenzell Ausserrhoden
- Stein, Meiringen, in the canton of Bern
- Stein, St. Gallen
- Stein am Rhein
- Stein (Obersaxen), a mountain above Obersaxen
- Stein Glacier, in the canton of Bern

=== Elsewhere ===
- Steins, New Mexico, a ghost town in New Mexico, near the Arizona border, United States
- Stein, Skye, a village on the isle of Skye, Scotland, United Kingdom
- Stein Islands, Antarctica
- Stein am Anger (Steinamanger), the German name of Szombathely, Hungary
- Stein, the German name of Dacia village, Jibert Commune, Braşov County, Romania
- Stein in Oberkrain, the German name of Kamnik, Slovenia

=== Outer space ===
- Stein (lunar crater)
- Stein (crater on Venus), a crater on Venus

== People ==
- Stein (surname), a surname, including a list of people with the name
- Stein Erik Hagen (1956–2026), Norwegian businessman
- Stein Huysegems (born 1982), Belgian association football player
- Stein Mehren (1935–2017), Norwegian poet, author, essayist and playwright
- Stein Metzger (born 1972), American beach volleyball player
- Stein Reinertsen (born 1960), Norwegian clergyman and bishop
- Stein Rokkan (1921–1979), Norwegian political scientist and sociologist
- Stein Stone (1882–1926), American football and basketball player and coach
- Stein Eriksen (1927–2015), Swedish Olympic skier and ski personality

== Other uses ==
- Beer stein
- Stein (brewery), a beer brewery in Bratislava, Slovakia
- USS Stein (FF-1065), a frigate in the U.S. Navy
- Stein (grape), another name for the white wine grape Chenin blanc
- Steinwein, wine from the Franconia vineyard Würzburger Stein
- Stein (band), theatre music group made up of Katharina Franck, FM Einheit and Ulrike Haage

== See also ==
- Stein Castle (disambiguation)
- Stein mansion
- Steiner (disambiguation)
- Steins (disambiguation)
- Steni (disambiguation)
- Stine
- Stein House (disambiguation)
- Justice Stein (disambiguation)
