= Baun =

Baun may refer to:

== People ==
- Aleta Baun, Indonesian environmental activist
- Alexander Baun (born 1995), Danish football player
- Bobby Baun (1936–2023), Canadian ice hockey player
- John De Baun (1852–1912), Australian businessman
- Kyle Baun (born 1992), Canadian ice hockey player
- Stine Baun Eriksen (born 1995), Danish handball player
- Tine Baun (born 1979), Danish badminton player
- Zack Baun (born 1996), American American football player

== Places ==
- Baun, West Timor

== Other ==
- British Association of Urological Nurses
