= Styn =

Styn may refer to:

- John Styn, American blogger and web designer
- Stijn "Styn" Derksen, member of the Dutch music duo Mae Seven

== See also ==
- Stynes
- Steins (disambiguation)
