= Menorah in Flames (Belgrade) =

Holocaust memorial in Belgrade, Serbia

- Менора у пламену
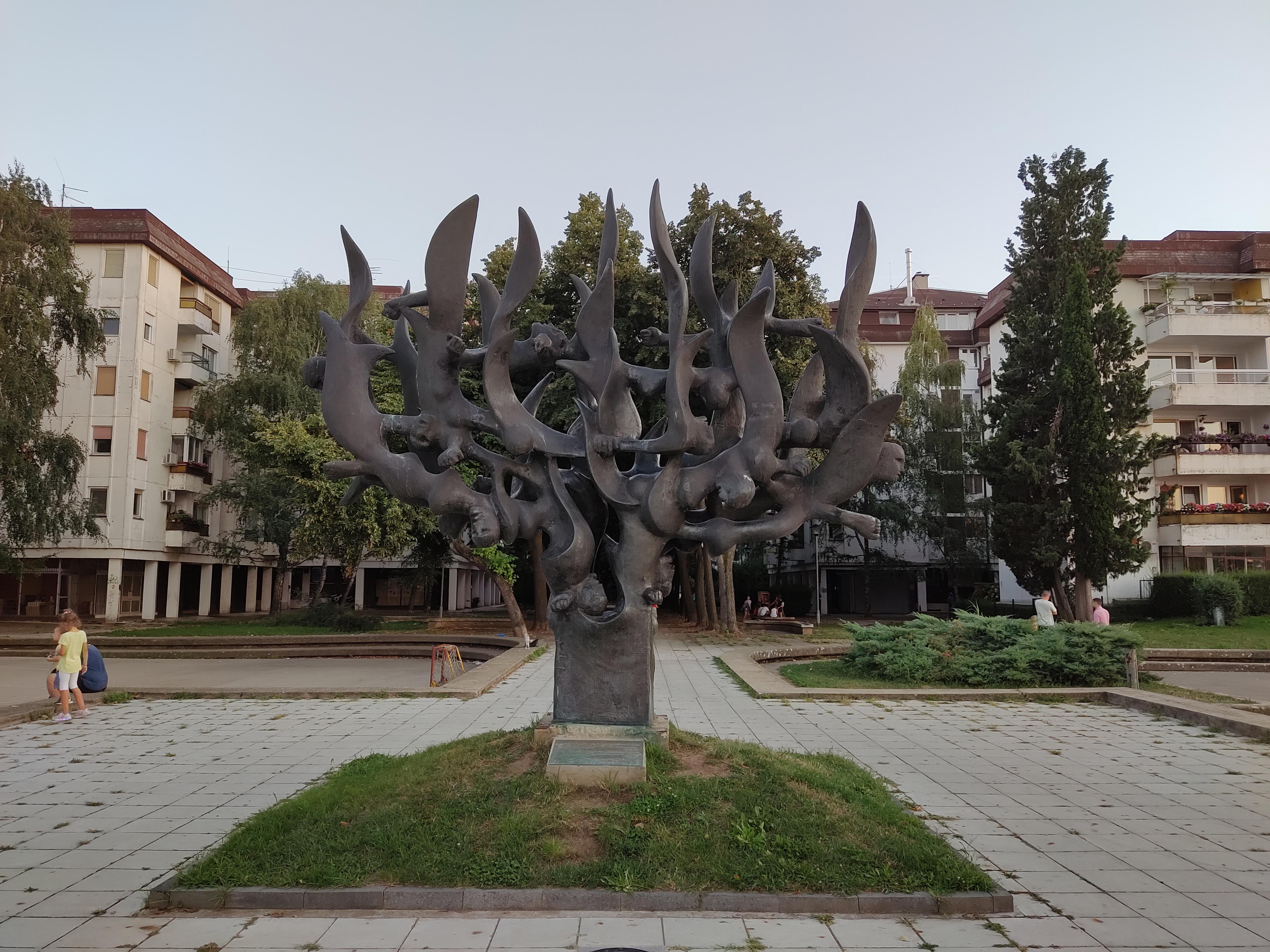
- The monument on the Danube riverbank in Dorćol
- Interactive map of Menorah in Flames
- Location: Tadeuša Košćuška Street, Belgrade, Serbia
- Coordinates: 44°49′49.6″N 20°27′26.7″E
- Designer: Nandor Glid
- Type: Holocaust memorial
- Material: Bronze
- Height: Approx. 4–5 metres
- Completion date: 21 October 1990
- Dedicated to: Jewish victims of the Holocaust in Belgrade and Serbia

Menorah in Flames (Serbian: Менора у пламену), also known as the Monument to Jewish Victims of Nazi Genocide in Belgrade and Serbia, is a Holocaust memorial in Belgrade, Serbia. Designed by sculptor and Holocaust survivor Nandor Glid, it was unveiled on 21 October 1990 on the Danube riverbank in the Dorćol neighbourhood, the historic Jewish quarter of the city. It commemorates the Jewish victims of the Holocaust in German-occupied Serbia.

== Historical background ==
Before the Second World War, approximately 12,000 Jews lived in Serbia. Following the German invasion of Yugoslavia in April 1941, Serbia was placed under military administration. Mass shootings began immediately, with most Jewish men executed by German forces, while women and children were later interned and murdered. By mid-1942, the German authorities declared Serbia Judenfrei (free of Jews).

== Commission and design ==
In 1989, Yugoslav sculptor and Holocaust survivor Nandor Glid was commissioned to create a monument. Glid had previously designed memorial sculptures at former concentration camp sites including Mauthausen and Dachau. The work was installed near Jevrejska Street, close to the site from which Belgrade’s Jews were deported.

Glid characterised the flaming menorah as a symbol that "proved resilient and survived the whirlwind of the war", intended to be accepted by ordinary people as part of the urban landscape. The monument is composed of a tall sculpture in the shape of a menorah. The branches rise in flame-like forms, incorporating abstract human forms with outstretched arms and tilted heads suggesting movement and suffering. At the base of the monument is a plaque with an identical inscription in Serbian, English and Hebrew.

ЈEBPEJИМA, ЖPTBAMA HAЦИCTИCTИЧКОГ ГEHOЦИДА У БЕОГРАДУ И СРБИЈИ 1941-1944
HAPOД CPБИЈЕ, ГРАД БЕОГРАД, ОПШТИНА СТАРИ ГРАД И ЈЕВРЕЈСКА ОПШТИНА.
21.10.1990

TO JEWISH VICTIMS OF NAZI GENOCIDE IN BELGRADE AND SERBIA, 1941-1944.
PEOPLE OF SERBIA, CITY OF BELGRADE, MUNICIPALITY OF STARI GRAD AND THE JEWISH COMMUNITY.
21.10.1990

לקורבנות השואה היהודים בבלגרד ובסרביה 1941-1944
האנדרטה הוקמה ע''י העם הסרבי, עיריית בלגרד, מועצה מקומית סטארי גרעד והקהילה היהודית בבלגרד
21.10.1990

The monument was dedicated on 21 October 1990. At the ceremony, Jaša Almuli, then President of the Jewish Community of Belgrade, described the unveiling as "the first dignified burial of our dead, whose bodies had been thrown into nameless graves". He stated that the community would recite Kaddish and symbolically place the victims under the protection of the monument.

== Reception ==
The memorial was widely praised by members of the Jewish community, survivors and artists. It later inspired related works by Glid, including a version erected in Thessaloniki.

== See also ==
- The Holocaust in Serbia
- History of the Jews in Serbia
- List of Holocaust memorials
