= Steen =

Steen may refer to:

== People ==
- Steen (given name)
- Steen (surname)

== Places ==
- Steen, Minnesota, U.S.
- Steen Township, Knox County, Indiana, U.S.

== Other uses ==
- Chenin blanc, a grape variety commonly called Steen in South Africa

== See also ==
- Het Steen, a castle in Antwerp, Belgium
- Het Steen (Elewijt), a castle in Elewijt, Belgium
- Stein (disambiguation)
- Stine, a surname and given name
