= Stine =

Stine is a name. Notable people with the name include:

== People with the surname ==
- Alison Stine (born 1978), American poet and author
- Brad Stine (born 1960), American comedian and author
- Brad Stine (tennis coach) (born 1958), American tennis coach
- Caleb Stine, American singer-songwriter
- Charles Stine (1882–1954), American chemist
- Charles J. Stine (1864–1934), American silent film actor
- Clifford Stine (1906–1986), American cinematographer of horror films
- David L. Stine (1857–1941), American architect
- Elizabeth Stine (1905–1993), American Olympic athlete
- Gail Stine (1940–1977), American philosopher
- Harold E. Stine (1903–1977), American cinematographer
- Harry Stine (baseball) (1864–1924), American baseball player
- Harry Stine (businessman) (born 1941/42, American businessman
- G. Harry Stine (1928–1997), American model rocketeer and author
- Jean Marie Stine (born 1945), American science fiction author and publisher
- Jeremy Stine (born 1980), American politician
- Katie Kratz Stine (born 1956), American politician
- Lee Stine (1913–2005), American baseball player
- Paul Lee Stine (1939–1969), American murder victim
- R. L. Stine (born 1943), American novelist of youth literature
- Raychael Stine (born 1981), American artist
- Tanner Stine, American actor
- W. Roland Stine (1940–2003), American educator and politician

== People with the given name ==
- Stine Andersen (born 1985), Danish sports shooter
- Stine Andersen (born 1993), Danish handball player
- Stine Andresen (1849–1927), German poet
- Stine Ballisager Pedersen (born 1994), Danish footballer
- Stine Baun Eriksen (born 1995), Danish handball player
- Stine Bodholt (born 1989), Danish handball player
- Stine Bonde (born 1988), Danish handball player
- Stine Borgli (born 1990), Norwegian racing cyclist
- Stine Bosse (born 1960), Danish businessperson
- Stine Bramsen (born 1986), Danish pop vocalist of Alphabeat
- Stine Brekken (born 2004), Norwegian footballer
- Stine Brix (born 1982), Danish politician
- Stine Dimun (born 1979), Danish footballer
- Stine Egede (born 1964), Greenlandic politician
- Stine Eiberg (born 1998), Danish handball player
- Stine Fischer Christensen (born 1985), Danish actress
- Stine Frantzen (born 1984), Norwegian footballer
- Stine Renate Håheim (born 1984), Norwegian politician
- Stine Lise Hattestad (born 1966), Norwegian freestyle skier
- W. Stine Isenhower (1927–2022), American politician
- Stine Hjermstad Kirkevik (born 1976), Norwegian ski-orienteer
- Stine Kristensen (born 1998), Danish handball player
- Stina Hofgård Nilsen (born 1979), Norwegian alpine skier
- Stine Hovland (born 1991), Norwegian footballer
- Stine Jørgensen (born 1990), Danish handball player
- Stine Hjelm Jacobsen (born 1979), Danish singer and vocalist of Electric Lady Lab
- Stine Johansen (born 1969), Norwegian sport wrestler
- Stine Brun Kjeldaas (born 1975), Norwegian snowboarder
- Stine Knudsen (born 1992), Danish handball player
- Stine Kufaas (born 1986), Norwegian high jumper
- Stine Kurz (born 2000), German field hockey player
- Stine Larsen (born 1975), Norwegian runner
- Stine Larsen (born 1996), Danish footballer
- Stine Nørklit Lønborg (born 1998), Danish handball player
- Stine Nielsen (born 1991), Danish sport shooter
- Stine Bredal Oftedal (born 1991), Norwegian handball player
- Stine Reinås (born 1994), Norwegian footballer
- Stine Rossel (1975–2007), Danish archaeologist
- Stine Skogrand (born 1993), Norwegian handball player
- Stine Stengade (born 1972), Danish actress
- Stine Westrum (born 1977), Norwegian trade unionist and politician

== Other people ==
- Sein Stine (1949–2019), Burmese hsaing waing musician
- Stine (singer) (born 1981), Albanian singer-songwriter and record producer

== See also ==
- Stein (disambiguation)
- Steen (disambiguation)
