= Simonides (disambiguation) =

Simonides may refer to:

- Simonides of Ceos, (c. 556–469 BC), a lyric poet
- Simonides the genealogist, author of 3 books called Genealogies and three books called Evrimata (Findings), grandson of Simonides of Ceos the lyric poet
- Semonides of Amorgos, (7th century BC) an iambic poet whose name was generally spelled "Simonides" in ancient texts
- Constantine Simonides (1820–1890), 19th-century forger of 'ancient' manuscripts
- Vasilis Simonides, Greek Nazi collaborator who helped organize the 1942 Eleftherias Square roundup
