= List of streets in Thessaloniki =

This article is a list of notable streets in Thessaloniki, Greece:

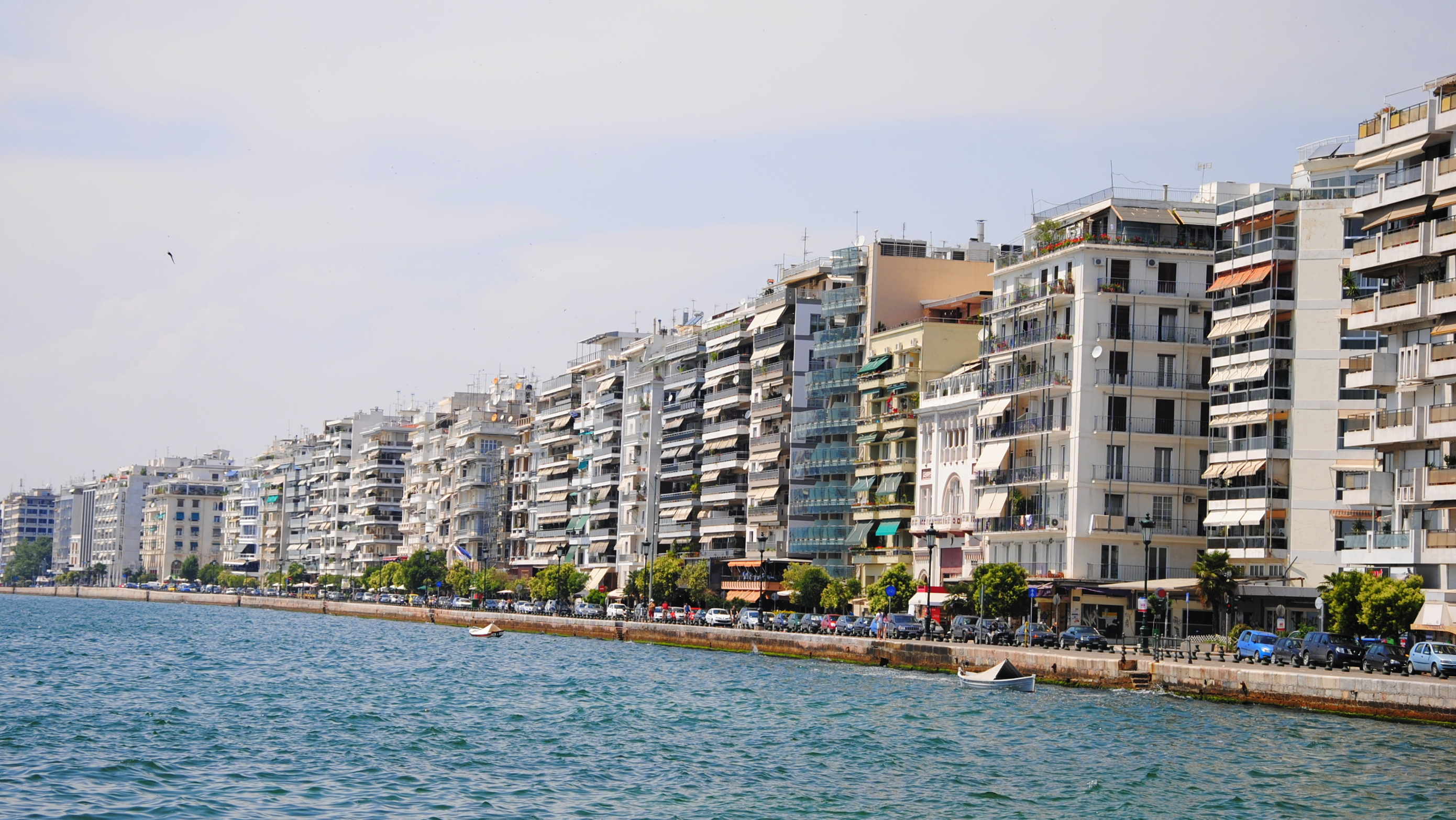
Nikis Avenue

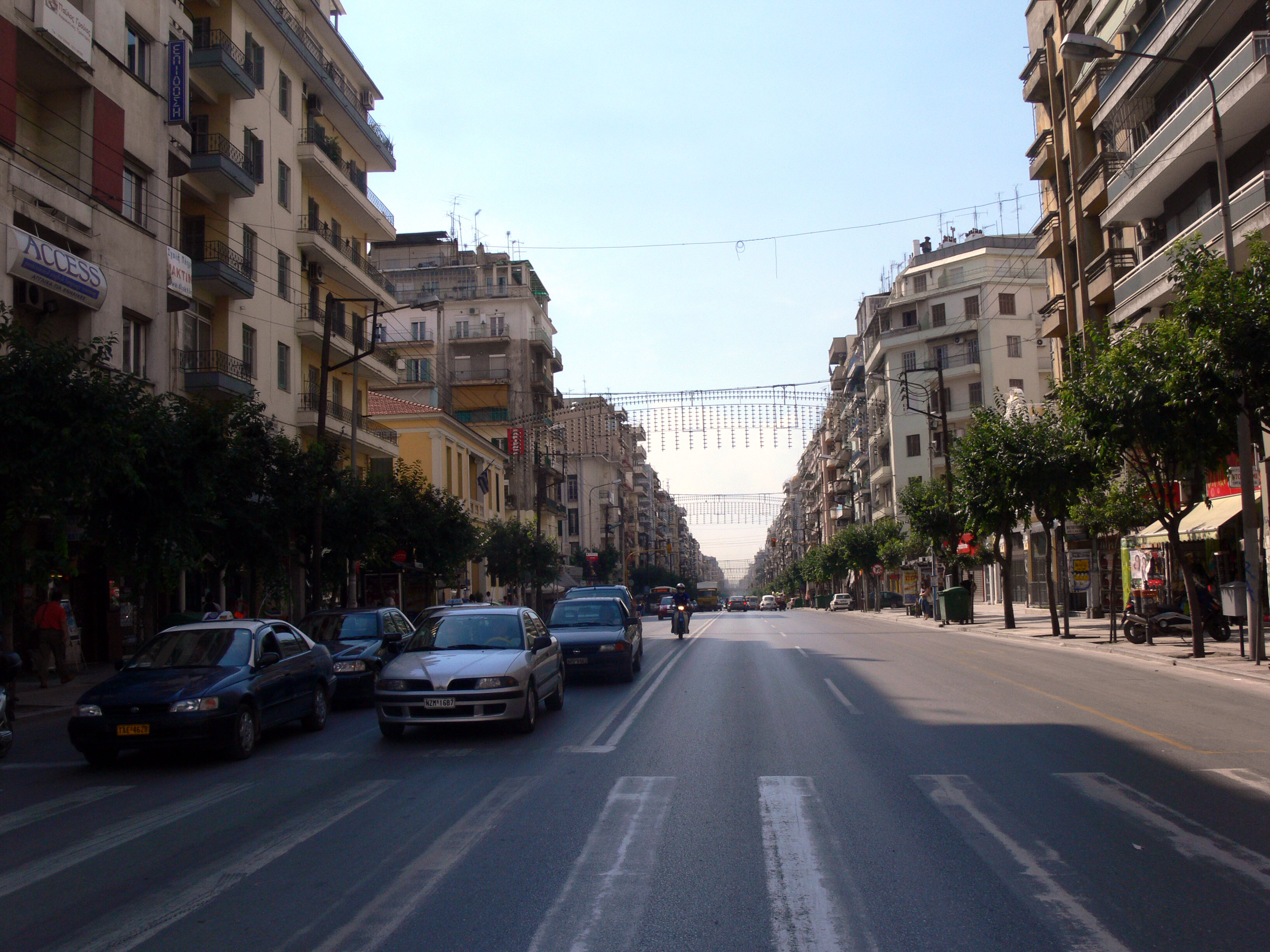
Egnatia Street

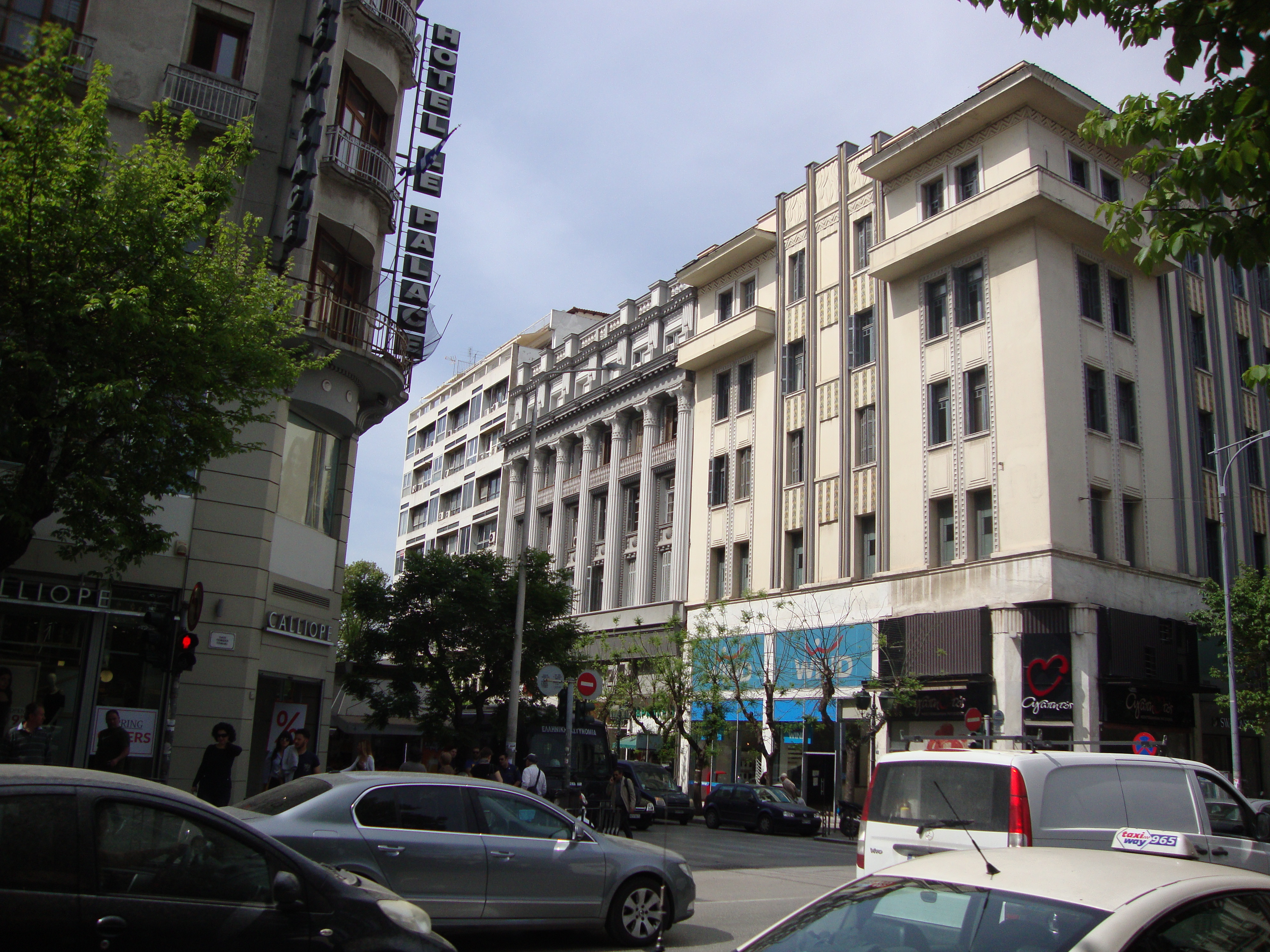
Tsimiski Street

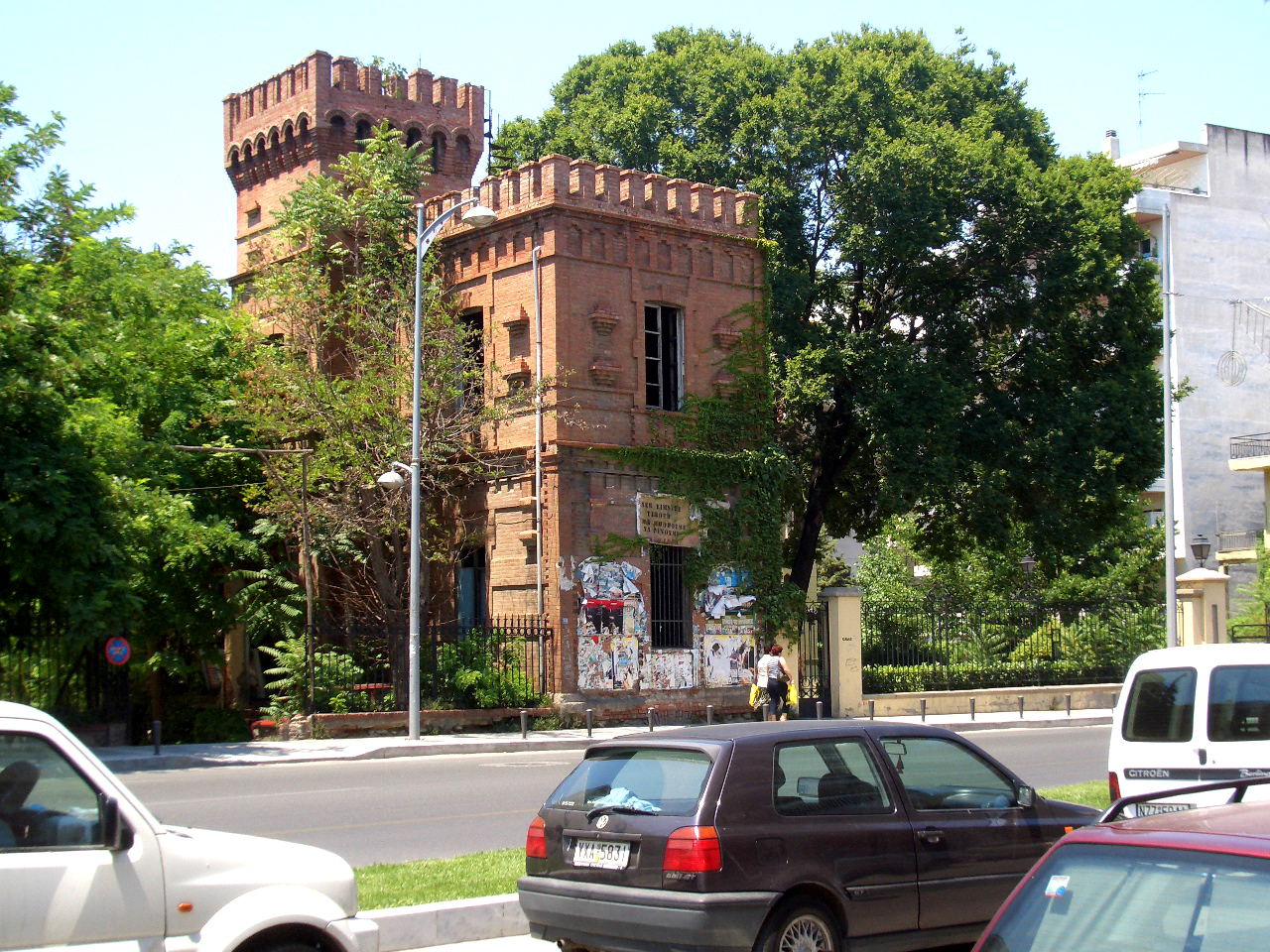
Vasilissis Olgas Avenue

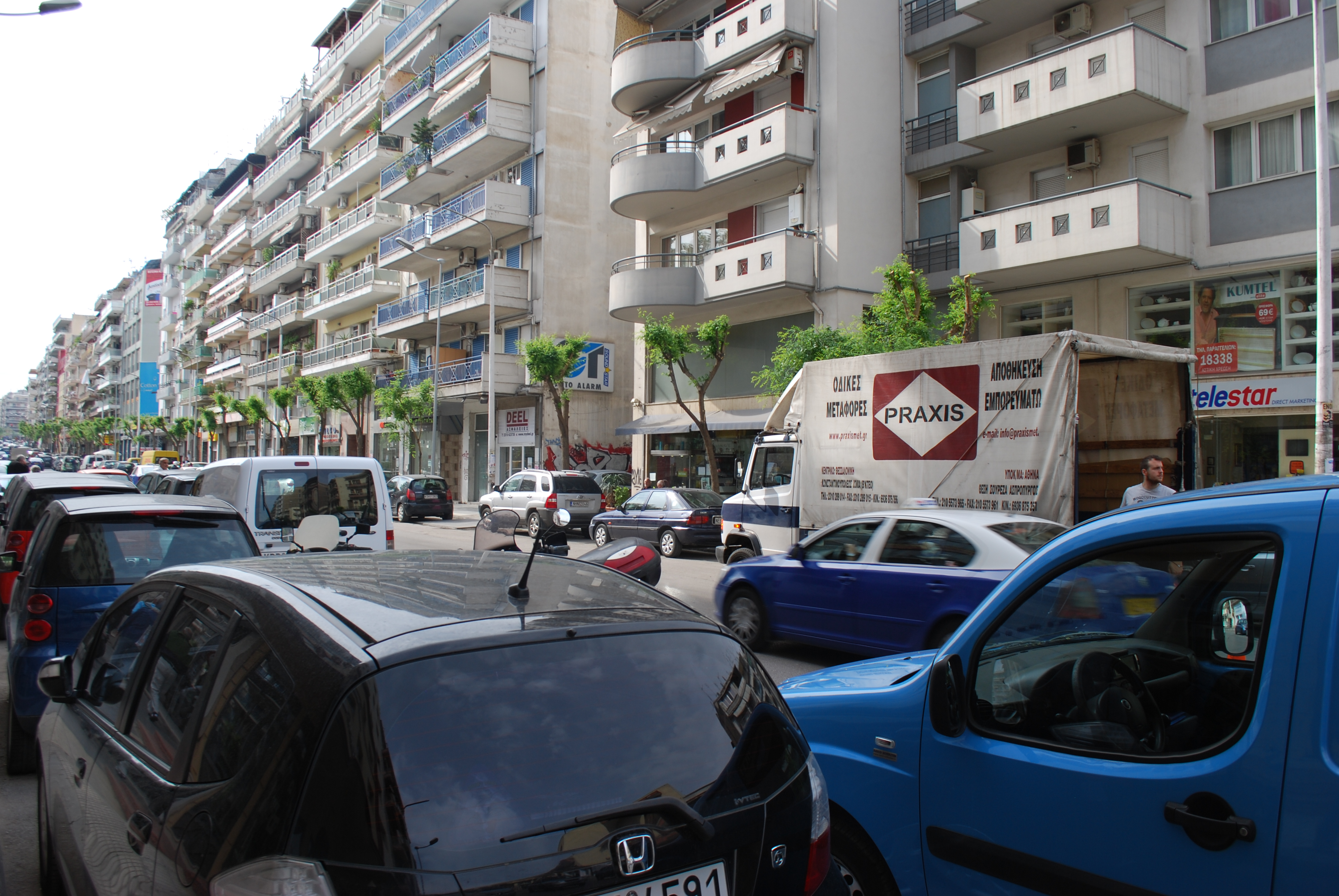
Agiou Dimitriou Street

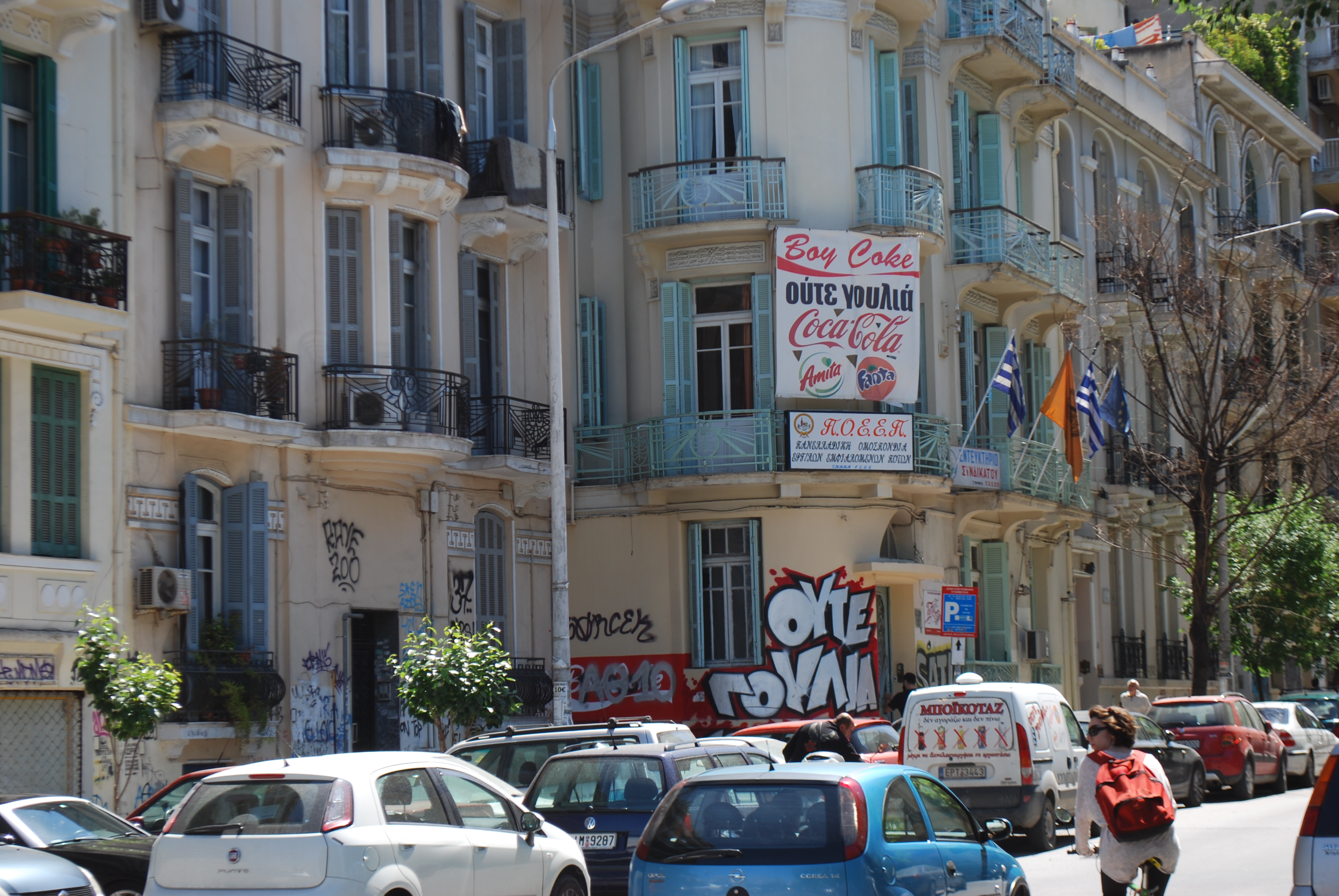
Filippou

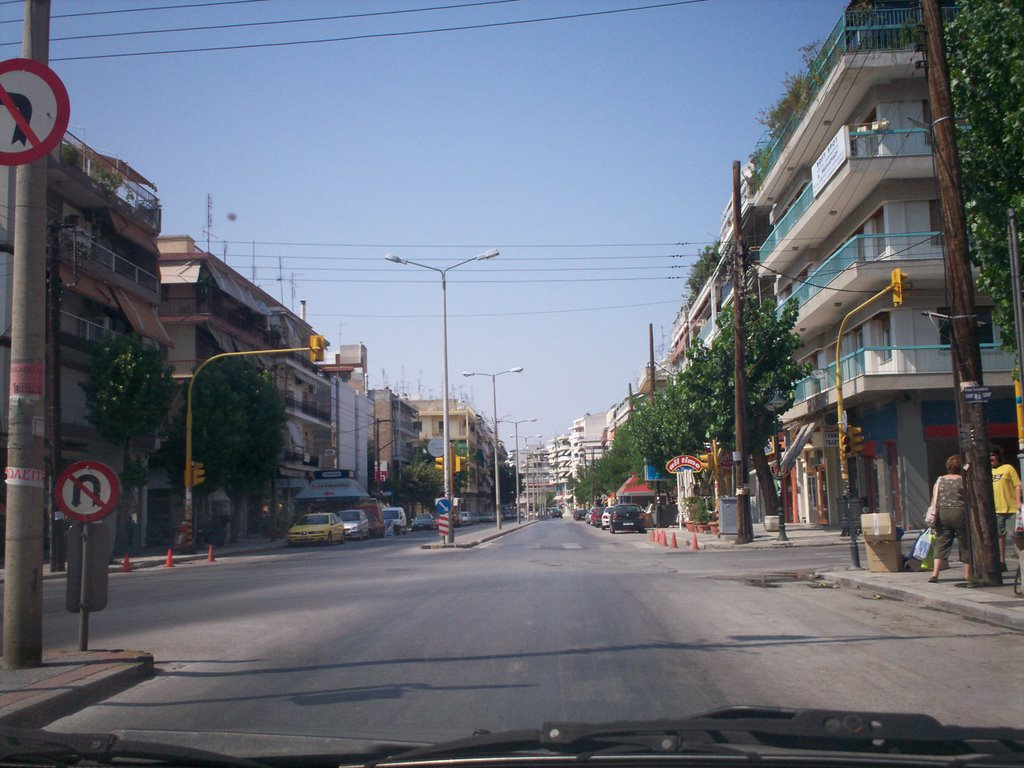
Papanastasiou

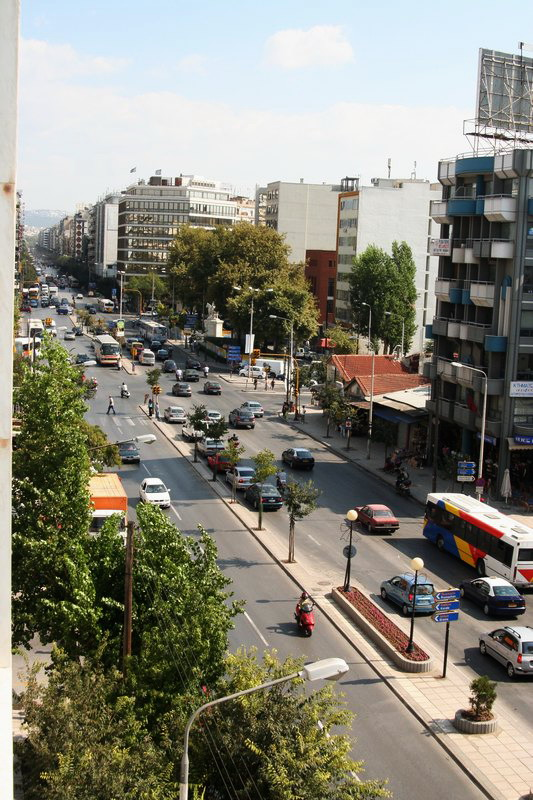
Monastiriou

- Agias Sofias Street
- Agion Panton Street
- Agiou Dimitriou Street
- Andrea Papandreou Avenue
- Angelaki Street
- Botsari Street
- Edessis Street
- Georgiou Papandreou Street
- Ionos Dragoumi Street
- Stefanou Dragoumi Street
- Delfon Street
- D'Espèrey Street, named after Louis Franchet d'Espèrey
- Ethnikis Amynis Street (National Defence)
- Egnatia Street
- Ermou Street
- Heptapyrgiou Street
- Iktinou Street
- Kapodistria Street
- Kaftanzoglou Street
- Kassandrou Street
- Karolou Diehl Street, named after Charles Diehl
- Nea Egnatia - Karamanli Street
- Kastron Street
- Koromila Street, named after Lambros Koromilas
- Lambraki Street, named after Grigoris Lambrakis
- Maria Callas Street, named after Maria Kallas
- Mackenzie King Street
- Megas Alexandros Avenue
- Monastiriou Street
- Mikis Theodorakis Avenue
- 25 Martiou Street
- 26 Oktovriou Street
- 30 Oktovriou Avenue
- Mitropoleos Street
- Monastiriou Street
- Nikis Avenue
- Olympiados Street
- Papafi Street, named after Ioannis Papafis
- Pavlou Mela Street
- Passalidi Street
- Papanastasiou Street
- Philippou Street
- Petrou Syndika Street
- Selefkou Street
- Stratou Avenue
- Sofouli Street, named after Themistoklis Sofoulis
- Svolou Street
- Tsimiski Street
- Valaoritou Street
- Velisariou Street, named after Belisarius
- Varonou Hirsch Street, named after Maurice de Hirsch
- Vasilissis Olgas Avenue, named after Queen Olga of Greece
- Vasileos Georgiou Avenue
- Vasileos Irakleiou Street
- Venizelou Street
- Voulgari Street
