= Eleftherias Square =

Square in Thessaloniki, Greece

- City Square
- Greek: Πλατεία Ελευθερίας
- Former names: Turkish: Hürriyet Meydanı; Platía Apováthras (Wharf Square); Platía Olýmpou (Olympus Square)
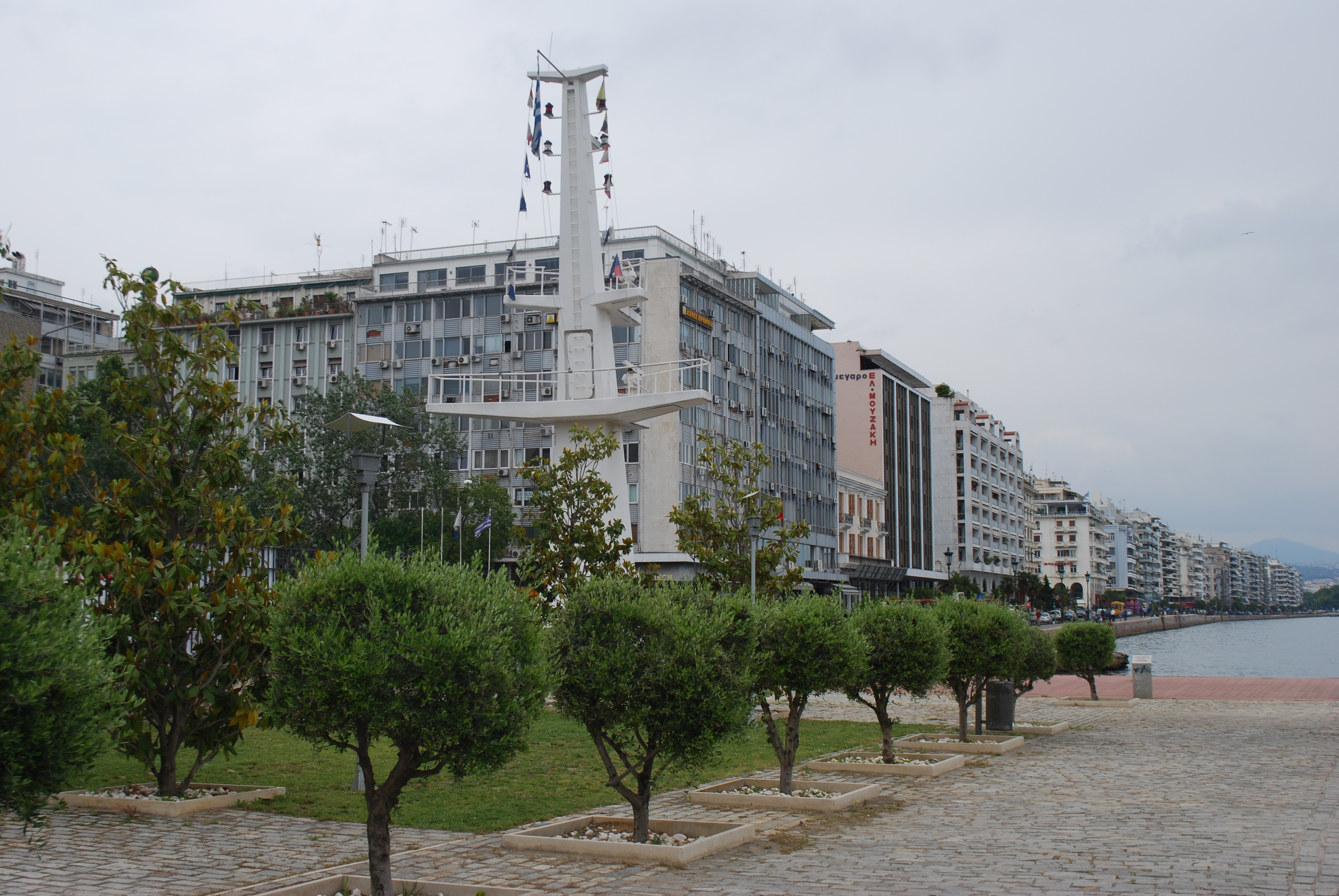
- Eleftherias Square on the waterfront
- Opened: 1867
- Area: 5,087 m^{2} (54,760 sq ft)
- Dedicated to: Young Turk Revolution
- Owner: Municipality of Thessaloniki
- Location: Thessaloniki, Greece
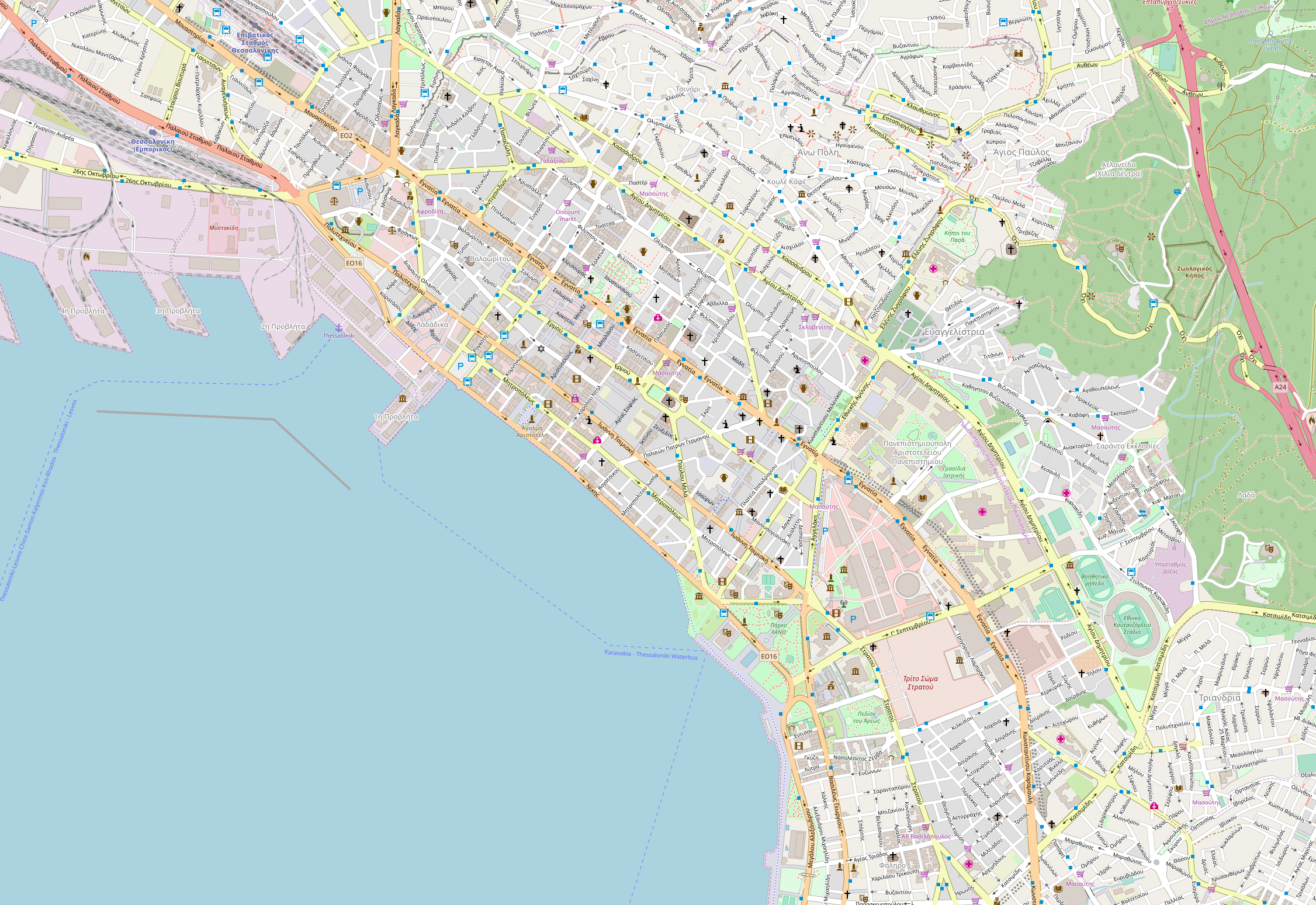
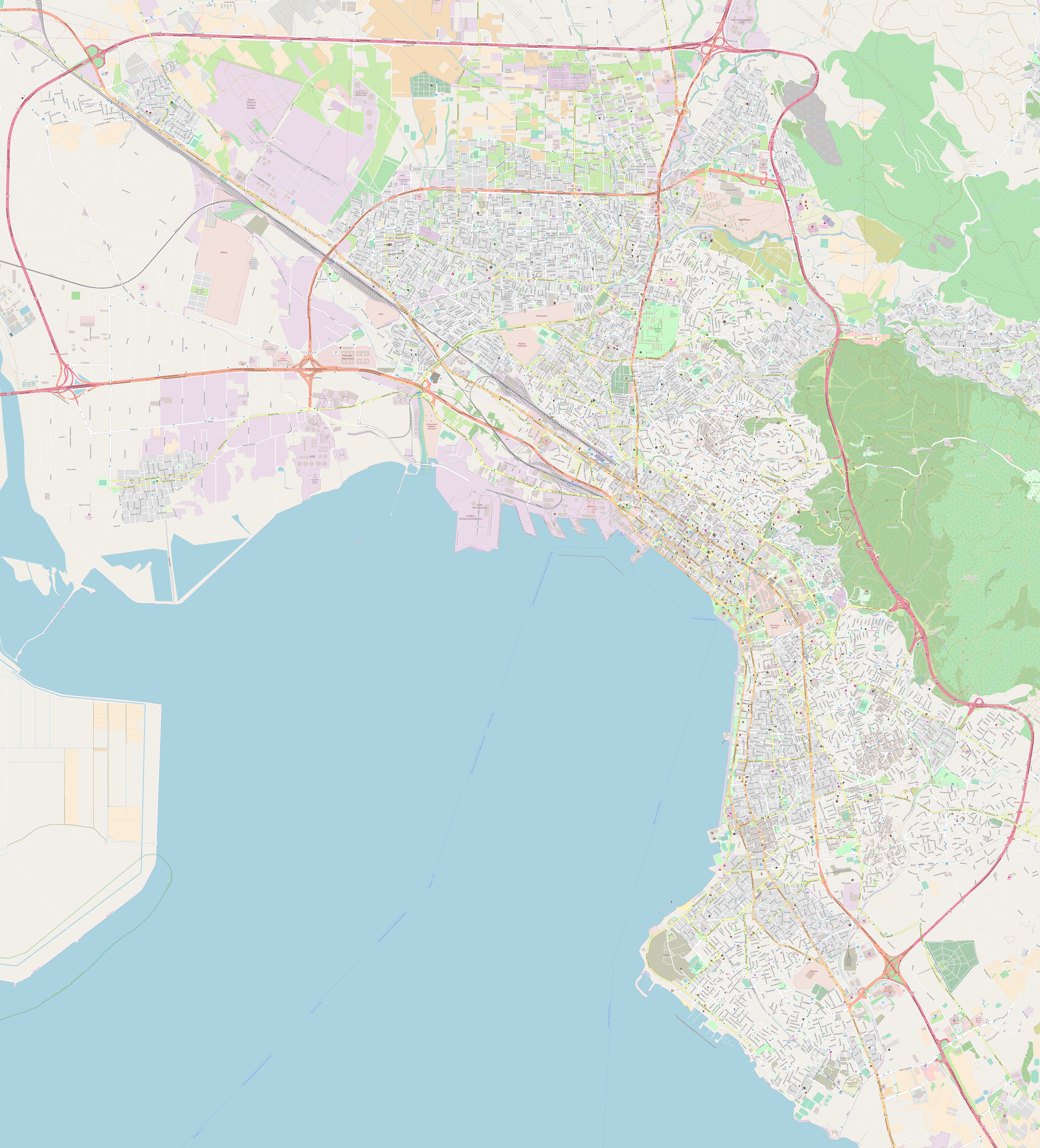
- Eleftherias Square (central Thessaloniki) Eleftherias Square (the Thessaloniki urban area) Eleftherias Square (Greece)
- Coordinates: 40°38′02″N 22°56′17″E

Eleftherias Square (Greek: Πλατεία Ελευθερίας, Platía Eleftherías, Liberty Square) is a central square in downtown Thessaloniki, Greece. It takes its name from the Young Turk Revolution, which began in the square in 1908. The square is currently a car park, but a public competition was launched by the Municipality of Thessaloniki in 2013 to select a design for its redevelopment into a park. Construction was initially expected to start in 2018 at a cost of €5.1 million ($6.03 million).

The square is bound by Mitropoleos street to the north, Nikis Avenue and the old waterfront of Thessaloniki to the south, Ionos Dragoumi street to the west and Venizelou street to the east. It is trapezoidal in shape and covers an area of approximately 5,087 m^{2} (54,760 sq ft). The square is surrounded by banks, insurance companies, and offices.

On 11 July 1942, thousands of Greek Jewish men were rounded up, publicly tortured and humiliated before being registered for forced labour during the Holocaust in Greece.

== History ==
Before becoming a square, the Walls of Thessaloniki ran through the site, along with a Byzantine-era tower to guard the entrance of the port. In the Ottoman period this tower was called Tophane (Cannon House). After 1870, when the demolition of the southern and eastern city walls began, the sea would reach the middle of the known square.

The demolition of the wall to facilitate entry to the port created more space and helped the mobility of the ships. The opening of the Mehmet Sabri Pasha road (nowadays Venizelou Street) in 1867 created a small square as the road widened towards the wharfs. It was initially called Platía Apováthras (Wharf Square) and later Platía Olýmpou (Olympus Square) on account of the views of Mount Olympus across the sea. During the late Ottoman Empire the square became an important cosmopolitan centre of the neighbourhood, known as Frangomahalas (Turkish: Frenk Mahallesi, European or Frankish Quarter), and the wider city. It also evolved into centre of commerce and finance, making Thessaloniki the financial capital of the Ottoman Balkans and a substantial economic player in the eastern Mediterranean. The buildings of the Banque de Salonique, Banque d'Orient, and Imperial Ottoman Bank were all within walking distance of the square. The Olympos Hôtel, including its restaurant, as well as the Hôtel Royale, were focal points of the early Ottoman square. The square itself became the point of entry to the city for visitors travelling by boat.

Beginning in 1893, a rapid transit system is implemented in Thessaloniki by means of a tram network, with Eleftherias Square as the western starting point. Later in the decade the square is lit as part of the introduction of gas lighting in the city, while in 1908 the tram network passing through the square is electrified.

In April 1903, Bulgarian anarchists, members of the Boatmen of Thessaloniki, planted a bomb at a beer hall on the square; this was part of a coordinated terrorist attack which also saw the sinking of the French ship Guadalquivir and the bombing of nearby Ottoman Bank among others. This event was the starting point of the Macedonian Struggle.

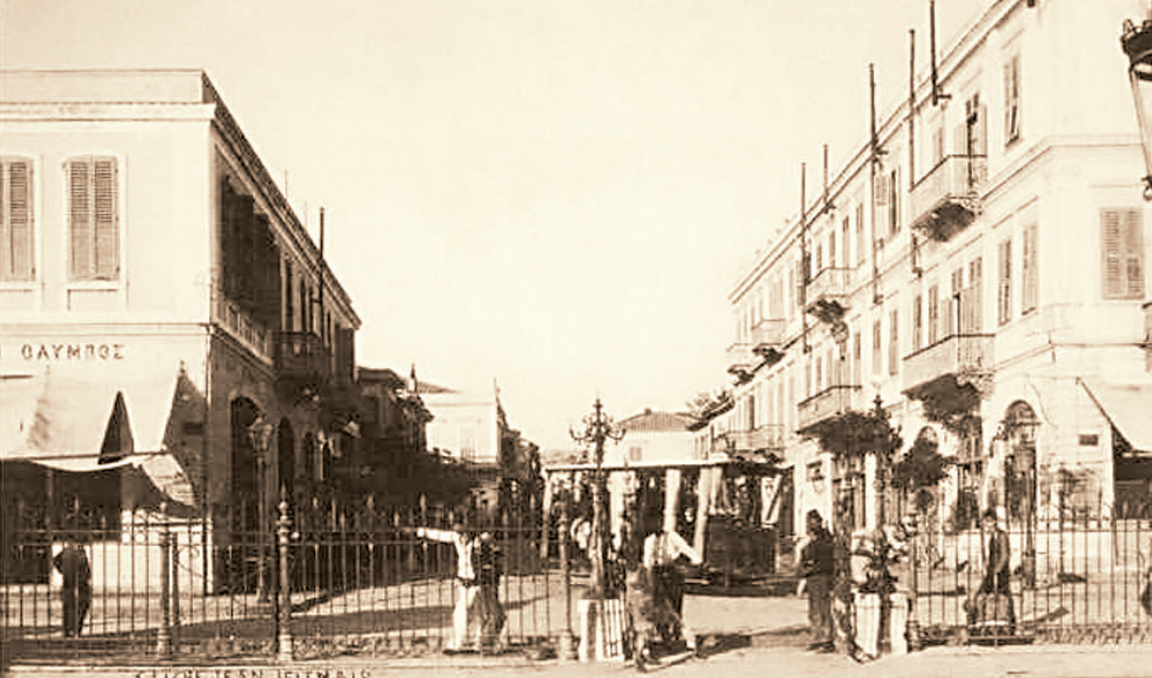
Olympus Square in the late 1800s.

The rise of Thessaloniki as an Ottoman economic powerhouse meant an increase in western travellers, which rendered the original square unfit to cater to their needs. Between 1898 and 1911, the square was entirely rebuilt. Initially, the Olympos Hôtel was expanded and renamed Olympos Palace Hôtel; soon after, the Hôtel Royale was demolished and rebuilt. The Ahmet and Mehmet Kamapci brothers, who owned Olympos Palace Hôtel, built another luxury hotel on the square, the Hôtel de Rome, while the Stein Building, the city's then most modern building, was completed in 1911 under the sponsorship of mayor Hulusi Bey. The Grand Hôtel D'Angleterre also opened on the square, as well as numerous cafés, restaurants, and pâtisseries.

The Jewish Club des Intimes, with its library, was also based in the square. It was an upper class progressive society promoting philanthropy and various Jewish causes but at the same time pro-Ottoman and vehemently anti-Zionist; this created a lot of friction between the Club des Intimes and the Club Nouveau, a rival pro-Zionist private members club on the waterfront which split from the Club des Intimes. In his state visit to Thessaloniki in 1908, Sultan Abdulhamid II's official procession passed through the square and in front of the Club des Intimes. The standards at the Club were so high that they impressed a visiting British gentleman.

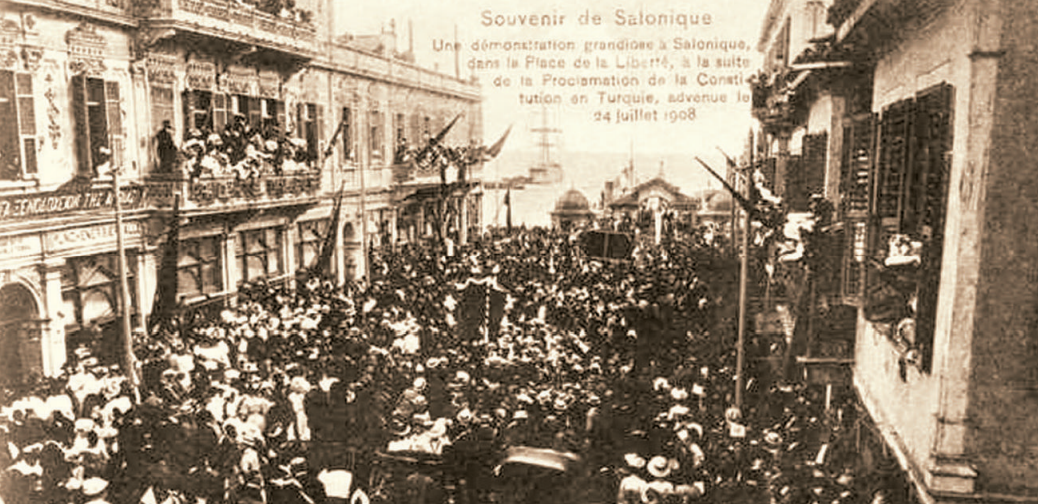
Proclamation of the Young Turk Revolution from the Grand Hôtel D'Angleterre on 24 July 1908.

The events of the Young Turk Revolution gave the square its current name. The Young Turks began the revolution in Thessaloniki and Enver Pasha declared to a crowd gathered on Eleftherias Square that "today the capricious ruler has ended, bad government is no more. We are all brothers. There are no Bulgars, Albanians, Greeks, Serbs, Romanians, Jews, Muslims. Under the blue sky we are all equal, we are proud to be Ottomans!" In old Ottoman and Greek postcards, it henceforth appears in French as Place de la Liberté (Liberty Square).

After Thessaloniki became part of Greece in 1913, the Liberal Association of Macedonia, the first Liberal Club in Greece, was opened on one of the buildings around the square in January 1916. It was an organisation supporting and promoting the causes of the Liberal Party and Eleftherios Venizelos, as Thessaloniki and the rest of Northern Greece were a Liberal stronghold at the time; the Liberal Club was the most successful in Greece at influencing official policy. During the First World War the square was popular with Allied troops of the 'five-nation army' fighting in the Salonica front, especially Café Flokas, the most famous pâtisserie in the city, where a Scottish volunteer nurse notes that "warriors [were] at last able to relax, drink, smoke, and discuss the newest singers at the city's café-chantants".

=== After the Great Fire ===
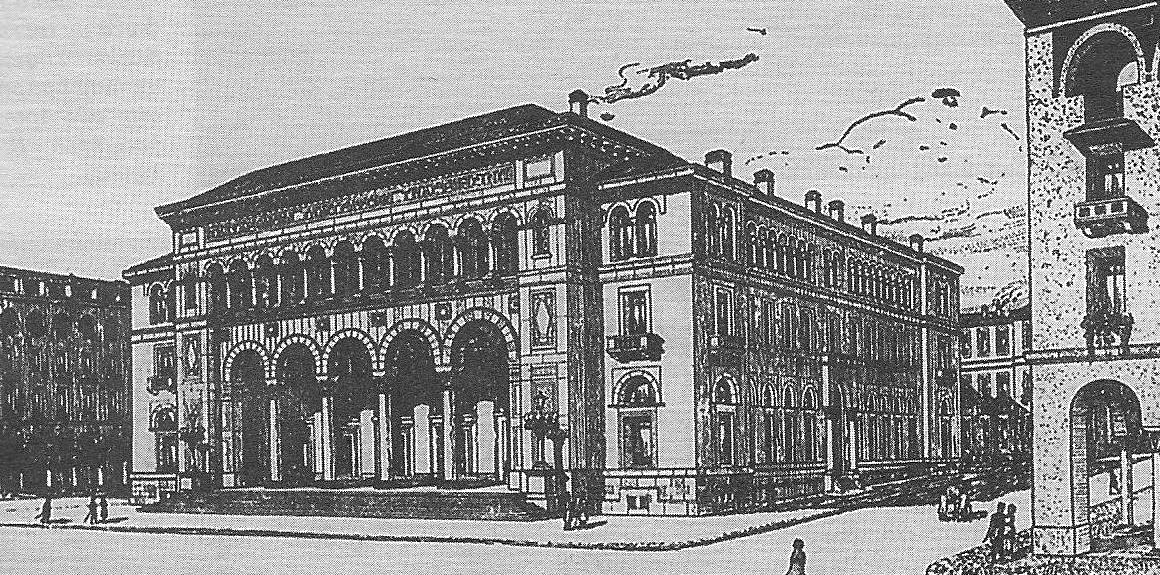
Hébrard's proposal for the TTT offices. It was never built and the empty lot became the current car park.

The Great Thessaloniki Fire of 1917 destroyed the original character of the square, with only the Stein Building, an Austrian department store, being spared. Because Thessaloniki was to be a planned city after the Fire the Government had issued a ban on reconstructions in any of the burnt-out areas of the city before the new plan could be finalised. The importance of Eleftherias Square to the life of Thessaloniki is illustrated by the fact that special Royal Decrees were issued, allowing establishments such as Café Flokas to be rebuilt temporarily.

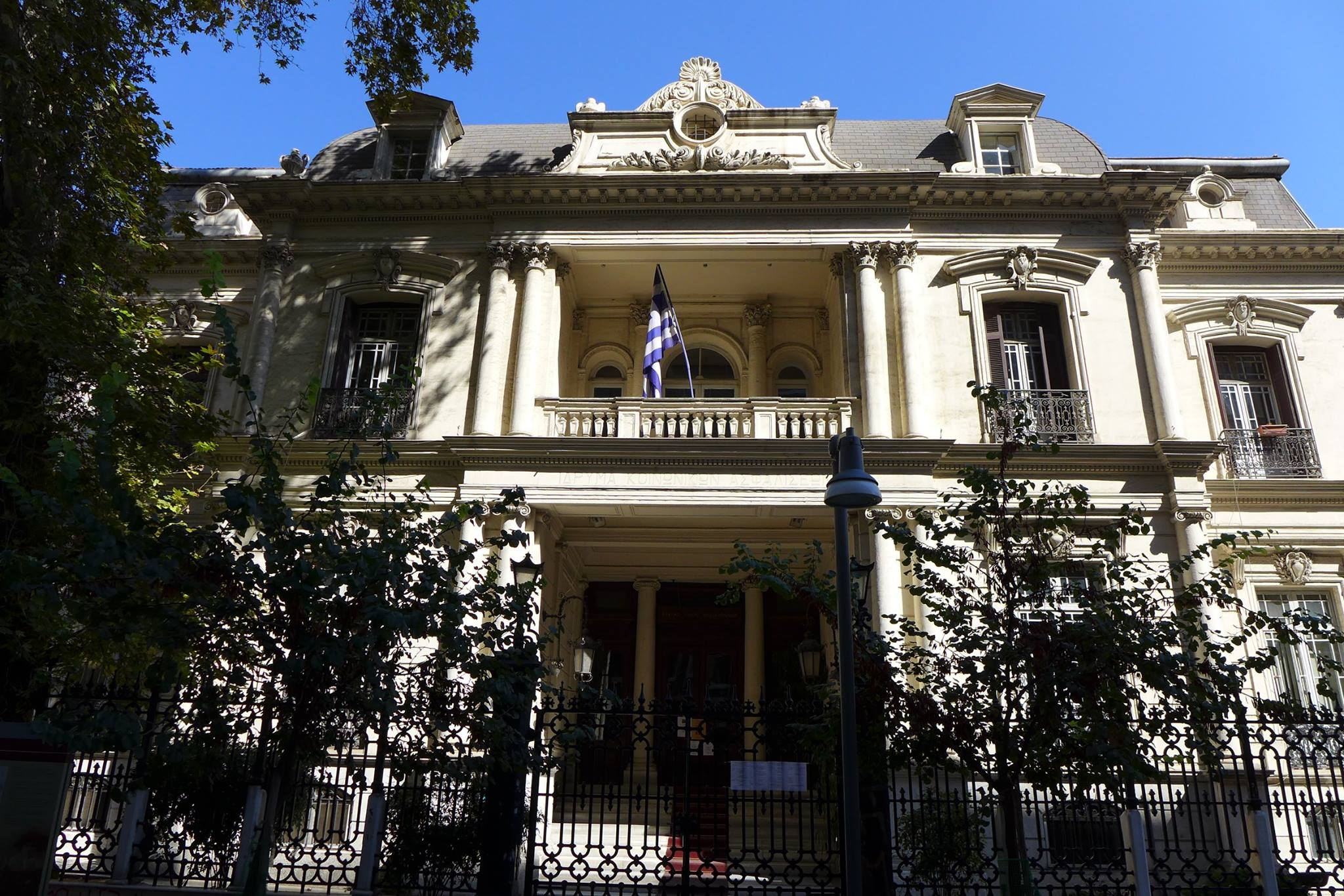
The State Conservatory (former Ottoman Bank) near the square.

The redesign commission, headed by French architect Ernest Hébrard, sought to replace the square with the regional offices of the Hellenic Post, Telegraph, and Telephony Service (Greek: Ἑλληνικὴ Ταχυδρομικὴ, Τηλεγραφηματικὴ, καὶ Τηλεφωνικὴ Ὑπηρεσία), as the square had become obsolete after the design of the nearby Aristotelous Square. Banks and other buildings would be constructed around the public building, named TTT House (Greek: Μέγαρον ΤΤΤ), and the waterfront promenade would be extended to provide some further public space. A small new square would be created there, called Post Office Square (French: Place de la Poste). Hébrard was not the only one to submit proposals for the design of the TTT building; Greek architect Marinos Delladetsimas also produced a proposal, with obvious influences from Hébrard's Byzantine Revival style.

The plans were largely not carried out, although reconstruction began in the late 1920s and early 1930s. In 1921 the first plan-compliant permit was issued, while construction on a building housing the National Bank of Greece on the northwestern corner of the square, as well as a building housing the Ionian Bank on the opposite side of the road, was started in the late 1920s. The National Bank of Greece opened in 1933, but the design was modified so as to also house the Bank of Greece, which had been established in 1928. Work on the foundations for TTT House commenced in 1931, but was hampered by the discovery of the sea wall which had been demolished in the late 1800s. This created major structural issues, and the project stalled and was abandoned. With the occupation of the city by Nazi Germany on 9 April 1941, the building of the Ionian Bank was requisitioned by the German authorities and turned into the local Ortskommandantur, the headquarters of the occupying authority. The Ionian Bank later became the Ionian and Popular Bank, which is now Alpha Bank; it still occupies the building.

=== During and after World War II ===
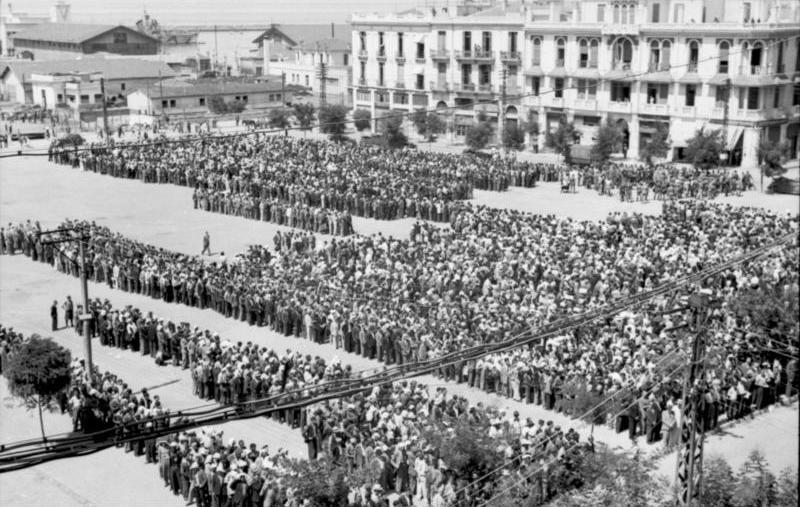
Registration of the Jews by the Nazis in the square, July 1942.

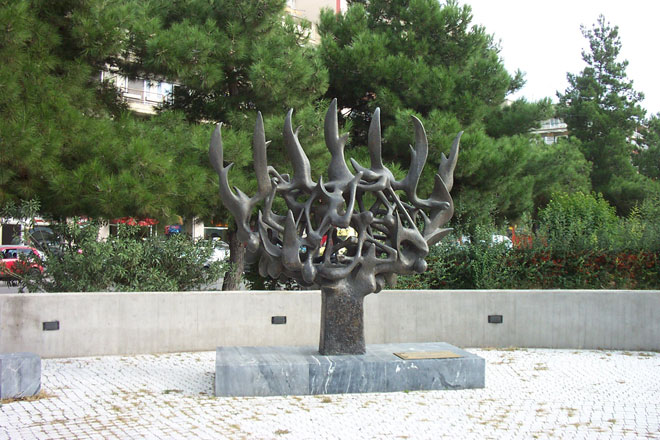
Menorah in flames, the Holocaust memorial which was later moved to the square.

In the summer of 1942, the day which became known as "black Shabbat", all Jewish men aged from 18 to 45 were commanded to present themselves at the square to be put to forced labour. On the same day, 6,000 or 7,000 of them were gathered in the square, guarded by armed German soldiers. The gathered crowd was publicly tortured and humiliated before being registered. The Nazis requested a ₯2.5 billion ransom to release the Jews from forced labour, which the community paid to them. Between 15 March and August 7, 1943, Thessaloniki's 56,000 Jews were deported to Nazi concentration camps. 96% of the prewar Jewish population was murdered.

After the Second World War the project to erect TTT House on the square was abandoned when it was officially proclaimed a public space on 6 April 1963 by order of the Ministry for Public Works. The Hellenic Post contested the decision but was unsuccessful in convincing the courts. It was subsequently turned into a parking lot and bus terminal, opened by the Hellenic Tourism Organisation as the only public parking facility in the city. This was unsuccessfully contested again in 1972. The removal of the parking and the redevelopment of the area back into an open square was first discussed in 1997, when Thessaloniki became the European Capital of Culture, but was ultimately abandoned due to the high costs of construction an underground parking facility. A Holocaust memorial, Menorah in flames, was created in by Serbian holocaust survivor Nandor Glid 1997, but was only placed in the southern corner of the square in 2006. The monument was defiled twice in 2018, once by Golden Dawn members in January, and once by far-right protesters participating in a Macedonia naming dispute rally. Thessaloniki mayor Yiannis Boutaris, who championed the redevelopment of the square back into an open space, challenged the memorial as being "hard to find". In the same speech in 2018 he outlined the reasons behind the Municipality's insistence regarding the redevelopment of a square, saying:

The new Eleftherias Square will symbolise the pride of all Thessalonians for their city, its past, its present, and its future. A few hundred metres away, the Thessaloniki Holocaust Museum will symbolise our shame. For all that happened, all that we did, and mostly for all we couldn't or did not want to do, natives and immigrants, right-wing and left-wing, during and after the war.

A design competition was launched in 2013, and in 2018 the tendering process to select a contractor to carry out building works was commenced. The total budget for the redevelopment of the square currently stands at €5.1 million ($6.03 million), funded by a loan from the European Investment Bank. By March 2019 the parking facilities on the square had been closed in preparation to the redevelopment.

== Architectural character ==
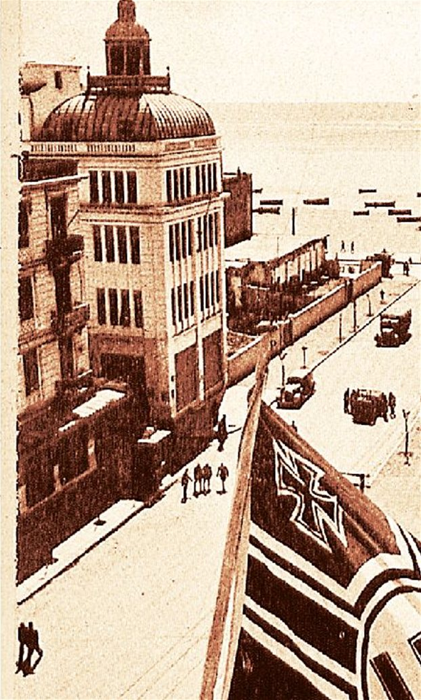
The Stein's Department Store building during the German occupation (1941-44).

The original aesthetic of Eleftherias Square was influenced by the Western European Belle Époque style at a time when much of Thessaloniki was orientalist in character, with narrow streets and a lack of even basic European city-planning. The area of the square had, at the time, become the city's cosmopolitan centre and European-style buildings in the eclectic style began to be constructed, including examples of Ottoman neoclassicism and baroque. During that time the square was much narrower than the one designed after the fire, but it was still the largest public square in Ottoman Thessaloniki.

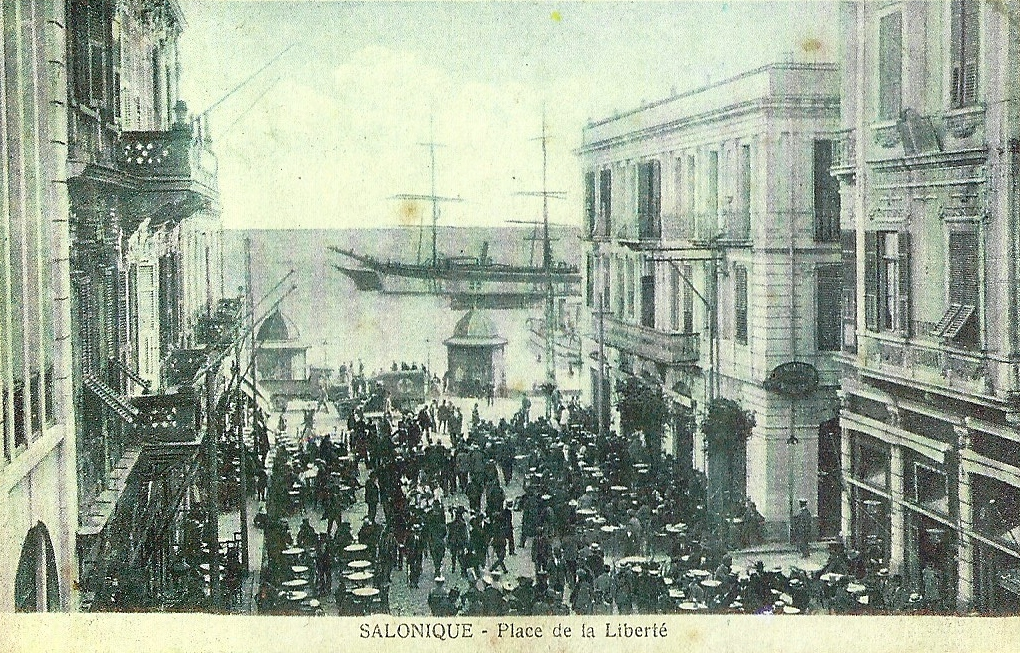
Eleftherias Square in 1914, looking towards the sea.

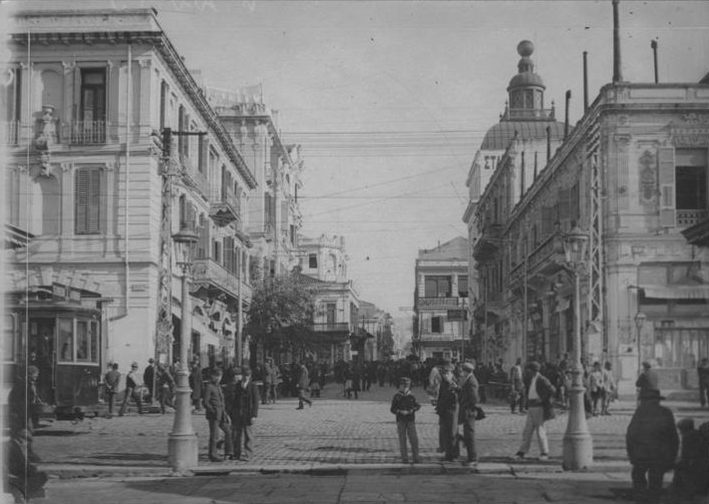
Eleftherias Square in 1914, looking towards the city.

=== Bank buildings ===
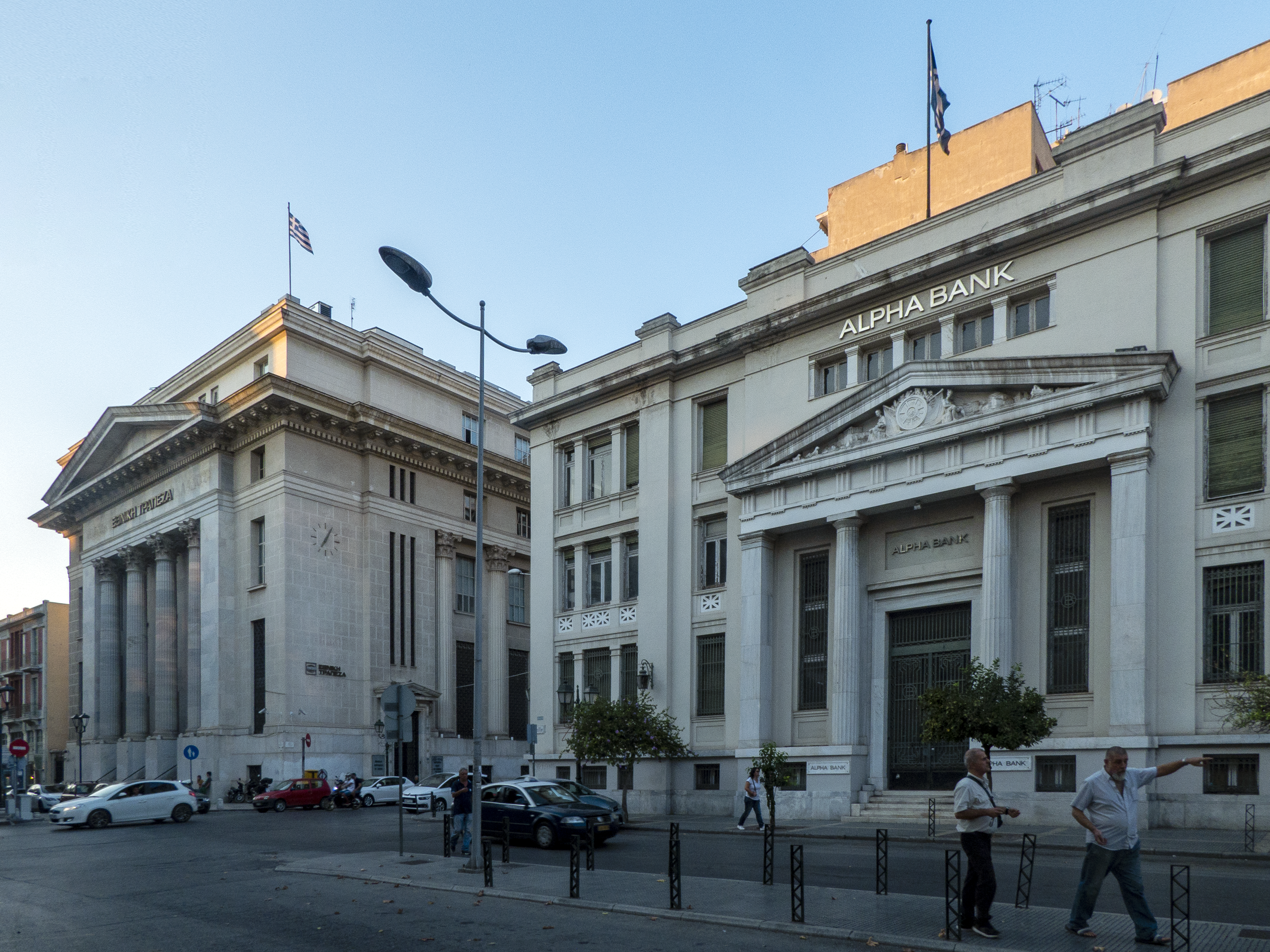
The Bank of Greece/National Bank of Greece and former Ionian Bank (today Alpha Bank) buildings.

== Transport ==
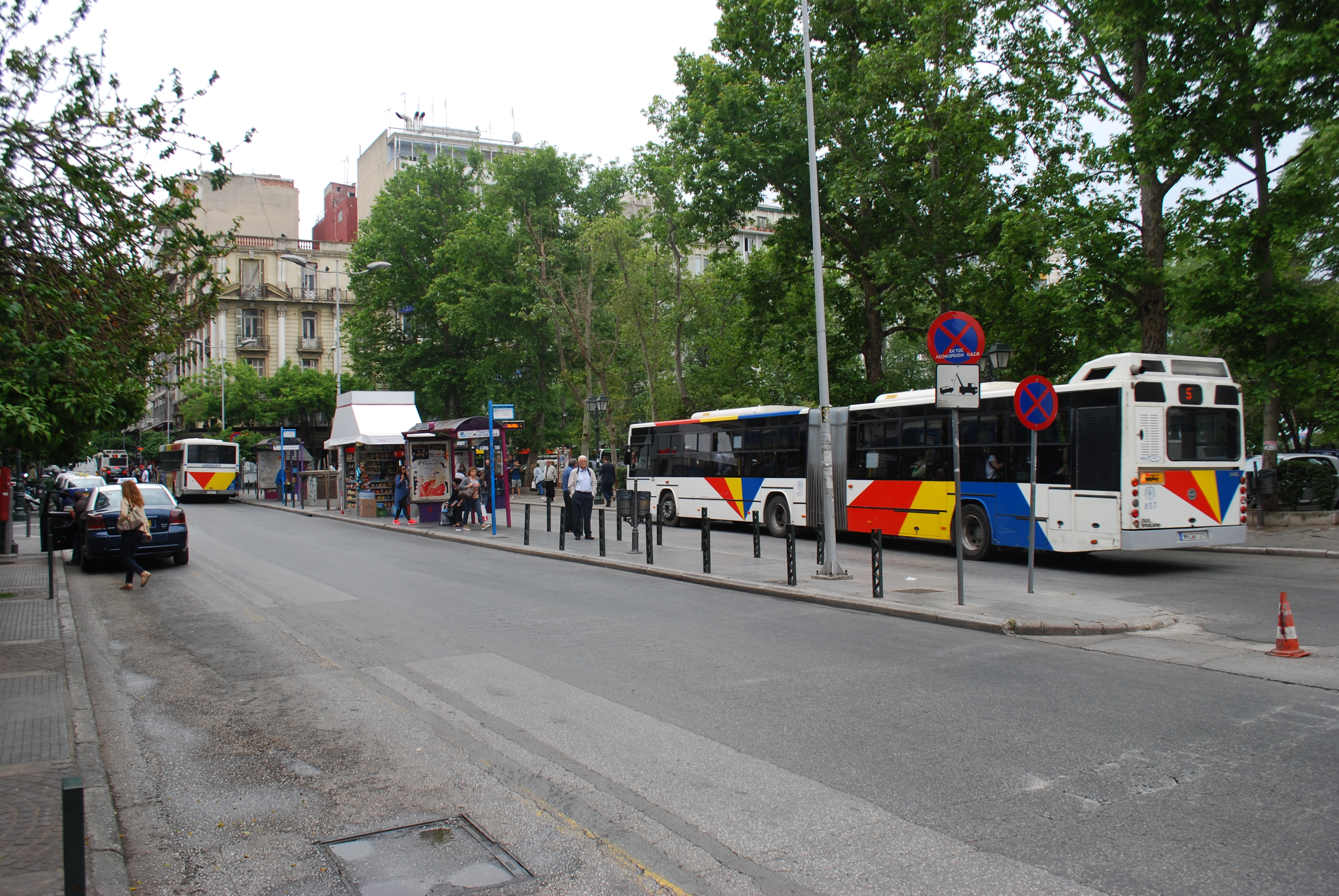
Mitropoleos Street next to the square

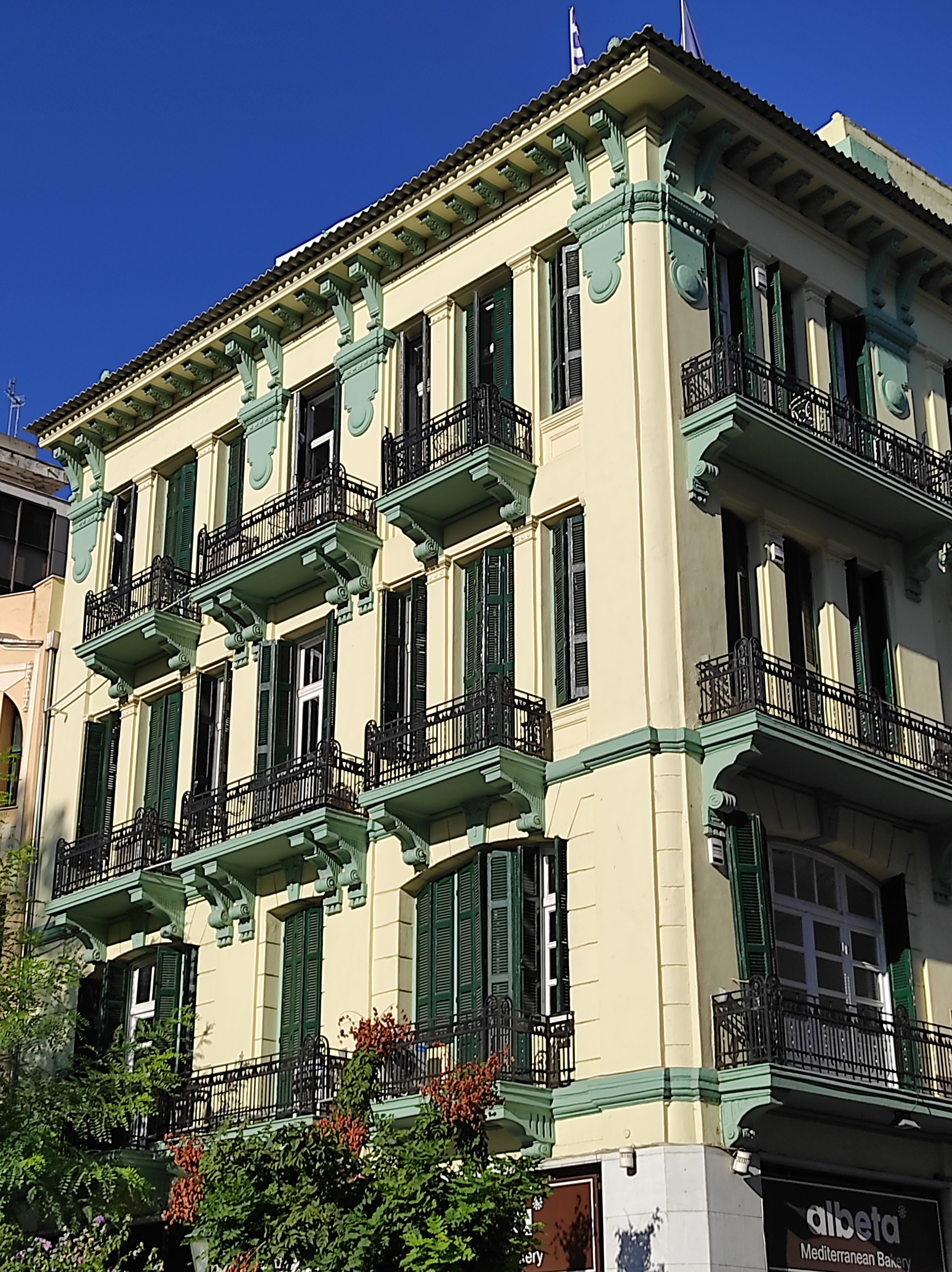
Tolios mansion (1925)

There are numerous modes of public transport that make the square accessible. The bus terminal at the north of the square is operated by the Thessaloniki Urban Transport Organisation (OASTH). Buses 05 (including 05A and 05B), 06, 33 (including 33A), and 35 stop at the square, and there is a dedicated ticket kiosk. The Thessaloniki Waterbus network has its terminus at the Port of Thessaloniki opposite the square. Thessaloniki Metro's Venizelou metro station, a short walk from the square on the corner of Venizelou and Egnatia streets, will also serve the square beginning in 2021; it will be served by both Line 1 and Line 2.

The square is also accessible by car. A parking lot has occupied entire square since the 1960s, but it is not known where the parking will be relocated following the redevelopment of the square. No provisions for underground parking have been made, which has led to questions being raised within the city council. The parking currently provides the Municipality of Thessaloniki with €1.2 million ($1.42 million) in yearly revenues, something which will end with the redevelopment of the square back into a public space without parking provisions.

== In popular culture ==
The events leading up to the destruction of the Jews of Thessaloniki were portrayed in a 2015 film by Manousos Manousakis titled Cloudy Sunday. Because of the significant change in the architectural character of the square, and the fact that it is now a car park, the scene depicting the registration of the Jews on Eleftherias Square was filmed at Kotzia Square in Athens.
