= Stynes =

Stynes is a surname. Notable people with the name include:

- Brian Stynes (born 1971), Irish Gaelic footballer
- Chris Stynes (born 1973), American baseball player
- David Stynes (born 1976) Irish Gaelic footballer and Australian rules footballer
- Jim Stynes (1966–2012), Irish-born Gaelic and Australian rules footballer
- Joe Stynes (1903–1991), Irish Republican and sportsman
- Jule Styne (1905–1994), British-American songwriter and composer
- Neil Stynes (1868–1944), American Major League Baseball catcher
- Yumi Stynes (born 1975), Australian television and radio presenter

== See also ==
- Styn (disambiguation)
- Trevor Stines (born 1996), American actor
- Steins (disambiguation)
