= Menorah in flames (Thessaloniki) =

Holocaust memorial in Thessaloniki

Coordinates: 40.63352444°N 22.93799638°E

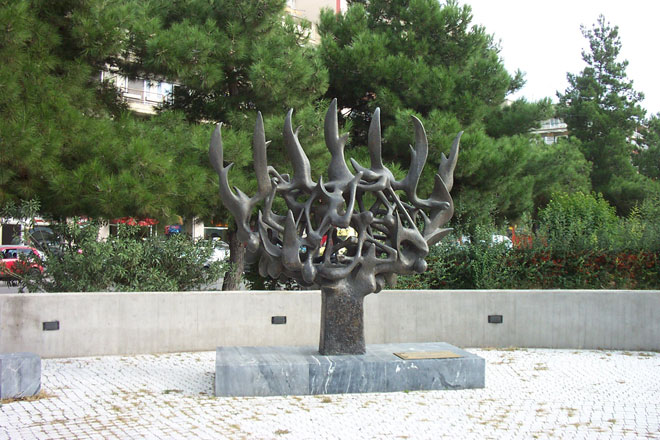
Menorah in flames on Eleftherias Square

Menorah in flames is a sculpture created in 1997 by Nandor Glid as a Holocaust memorial commemorating deportation of the Thessaloniki Jews.

The sculpture, initially built in a suburban area has been installed since 2006 on Eleftherias Square where a major roundup of 9,000 Jewish men took place in 1942.

It was the first Holocaust memorial to be built on a public space in Greece and its installation marks a change of attitude of Greek officials towards the remembrance of the Holocaust. The monument is regularly vandalized.

== Description ==
The base of the sculpture is built out of grey marble. The sculpture consists of a menorah created out of human bodies and flames. There are two plaques; one in Greek and English, and one in Greek, Hebrew, and English.

Inscription of the first plaque (in English):

DEDICATED BY THE GREEK PEOPLE TO THE MEMORY OF

THE 50,000 JEWISH GREEKS OF THESSALONIKI, DEPORTED FROM THEIR MOTHER CITY BY THE NAZI OCCUPATION FORCES IN THE SPRING OF 1943, AND EXTERMINATED IN THE GAS CHAMBERS OF THE AUSCHWITZ-BIRKENAU DEATH CAMPS

NOVEMBER 1997

Inscription of the second plaque (in English):

IN MEMORY OF THE 50,000 JEWS FROM THESSALONIKI, VICTIMS OF THE HOLOCAUST

KAROLOS PAPOULIAS, PRESIDENT OF THE HELLENIC REPUBLIC MOSHE KATSAV, PRESIDENT OF THE STATE OF ISRAEL ON THE OCCASION OF THE FIRST STATE VISIT OF THE PRESIDENT OF THE STATE OF ISRAEL TO THE HELLENIC REPUBLIC 16 February 2006

18 SHVAT 5766
