= Steni =

Steni may refer to:

== Places ==
- Steni, Paphos, village in the Paphos District of Cyprus
- Steni Dirfyos, village on Euboea island, Greece
- Steni Vala, village on the Greek island of Alonnisos

== People ==
- Antonella Steni (1926 –2016), Italian actress, voice actress, comedian and presenter

== See also ==
- Stein (disambiguation)
