= Mae Seven =

Dutch music duo

- Origin: Netherlands
- Genres: R&B, Pop, Hip Hop
- Years active: 2016 - current
- Members: Stijn "Styn" Derksen; Wouter "Winter" Derksen

Mae Seven is a Dutch music duo, consisting of brothers Stijn "Styn" Derksen (lead vocal) & Wouter "Winter" Derksen (instruments). They debuted in 2016 with the release of their single "Who To Believe".

== Early life ==
Styn and Winter were born and raised in a musical family in the Netherlands, where they were introduced to music from an early age by their father. Winter started playing and studying classical piano at the age of 8, and shortly thereafter showed interest in music production. Styn showed interest in singing and songwriting from an early age.

== Career ==
The band has released a total of 14 songs. Their debut single "Who to Believe", a blend of pop, R&B and Afrobeat, was released in 2016.

In 2020, they released "Want Me To Be". Keke Palmer, American R&B singer and actress, featured on the song and did part of the vocals. The song was initially written for the band's US tour, which was cancelled due to the COVID-19 pandemic. In the same year, Keke and Styn announced that they were dating.

The band has worked on music production with notable producers/mixing engineers such as Anthony Kilhoffer and Ken Lewis.

The duo currently resides in Los Angeles, United States.
