= Stein Castle =

Stein Castle (German: Schloss Stein or Burg Stein) may refer to:

- Stein Castle, Aargau, Switzerland
- Stein Castle (Bavaria), Germany
- Stein Castle (Saxony), Germany
