= Stein Mansion =

Historic building in Thessaloniki, Greece

Coordinates: 40.63371°N 22.93868°E

Stein Mansion (Greek: Μέγαρο Στάιν) is the name of a historic building in Eleftherias Square, Thessaloniki, Greece.

== History ==
Built in 1906, it was the only building of the square not destroyed by the Great Fire of Thessaloniki in 1917. It was designed by architect Eli Ernst Levi for the Austrian clothing retail brand "Stein’s Oriental Stores Ltd", which had also department stores in Egypt.

Later it housed the Hellenic Post Offices, while after WWII it suffered architectural interventions which damaged its initial design.

== Gallery ==
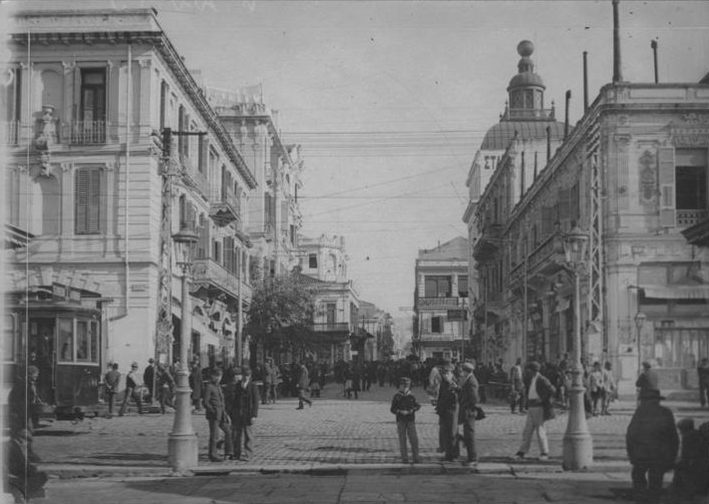
Eleftherias Square in 1914. The building is recognized by the globe of glass on the roof

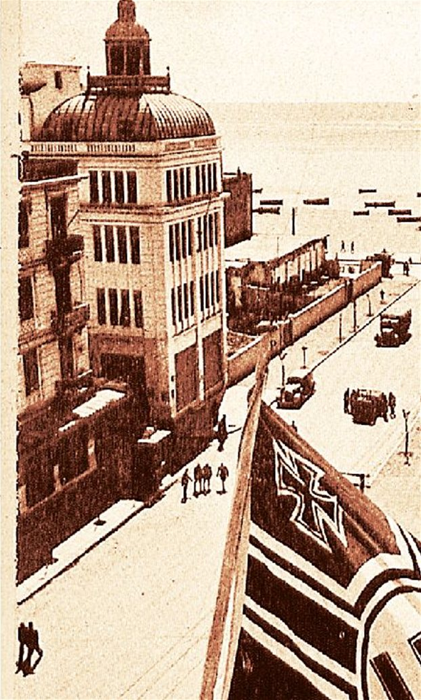
The Stein's Department Store building during the Axis occupation (1941–44)

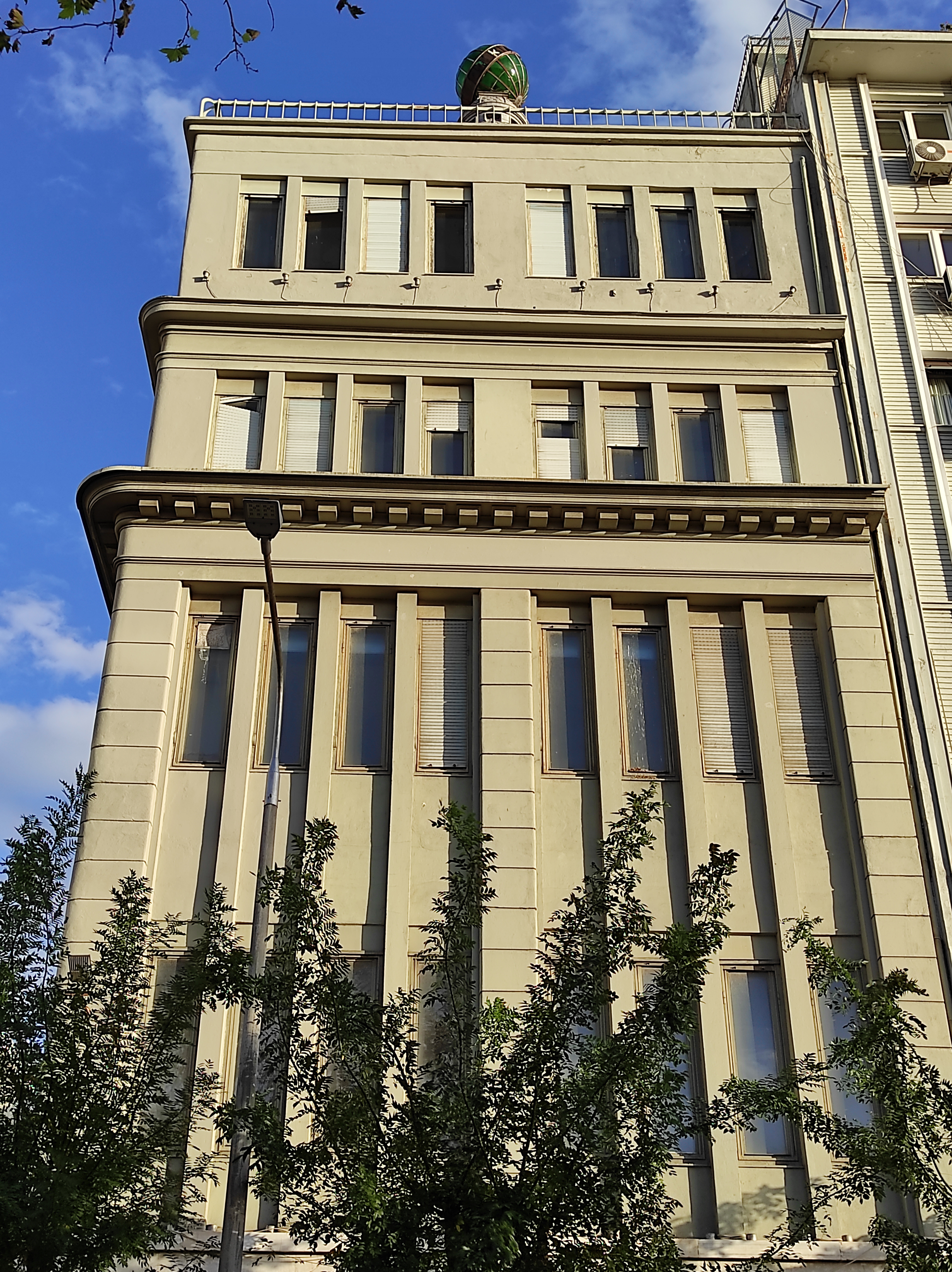
The building today

== Sources ==
- Μέγαρο Στάιν
