= Alexander Baun =

Danish footballer (born 1995)

Personal information
- Full name: Alexander Løntoft Baun
- Date of birth: 18 November 1995 (age 30)
- Place of birth: Herning, Denmark
- Height: 1.93 m (6 ft 4 in)
- Position: Right winger

Team information
- Current team: Brabrand
- Number: 19

Youth career
- Horsens

Senior career*
Years	Team	Apps	(Gls)
2014–2016	Skanderborg		
2016–2017	Tjørring		
2017	Skive	15	(0)
2018–2021	Hobro	24	(1)
2022–2023	Middelfart	6	(0)
2023	Aarhus Fremad	0	(0)
2023–	Brabrand	5	(0)
- * Club domestic league appearances and goals as of 23 April 2024

Alexander Løntoft Baun (born 18 November 1995) is a Danish professional footballer who plays as a right winger for Danish 2nd Division club Brabrand.

== Career ==
=== Skive ===
After having played lower league football in the Jutland Series for FC Skanderborg and Tjørring IF, Baun moved to Skive IK in the second-tier Danish 1st Division in January 2017. There, he impressed during the fall of the 2017–18 season which attracted the interest of Danish Superliga clubs.

=== Hobro ===
On 16 September 2017, it was announced that Baun had signed a three-and-a-half-year contract with Hobro IK effective from 1 January. He thereby turned fully professional, after having played on a semi-professional contract with Skive.

Baun made his professional debut on 28 February 2018 in a Danish Superliga game against FC Copenhagen. Coming on as a substitute for Edgar Babayan in the 77th minute, Hobro lost 0–2 after goals from Viktor Fischer and Rasmus Falk. This would be his only appearance for the club that season.

He would struggle with a complicated ankle injury the following year, which impacted his playing time significantly. He returned to playing football in February 2020, but again playing time was sparse. As Hobro suffered relegation to the Danish 1st Division in the 2019–20 season, Baun would see his playing time increase. He finished the 2020–21 season with 21 appearances, in which he scored one goal.

Baun left Hobro at the end of the 2020–21 season.

=== Later career ===
On 2 April 2022, Baun signed with Danish 2nd Division club Middelfart. He made his debut the same day in a 3–1 loss to Kolding IF. On 31 January 2023, Baun moved to fellow league club Aarhus Fremad. Without making a single appearance for Fremad, Baun joined city rivals Brabrand in the summer of 2023.
