= Steins =

Steins may refer to:

== People ==
- Kārlis Šteins, Latvian astronomer
- Walter Steins, Dutch Jesuit priest

== Astronomy ==
- 2867 Šteins, a small main-belt asteroid

== Video games ==
- Steins;???

== See also ==
- Stein (disambiguation)
- Stynes, surname
- Trevor Stines, American actor
- Steins, New Mexico, Ghost town
