= Steen (given name) =

Steen is an alternative spelling of the Swedish and Danish word sten meaning 'stone'; it is also a shortened form of Ollisteen. It is the given name of the following people

- Steen Bille (d. 1606), Danish diplomat
- Steen Andersen Bille, a family of Danish naval officers
- Steen Andersen Bille (1751–1833), Danish naval officer
- Steen Andersen Bille (1797–1883), Danish vice-admiral
- Steen Steensen Blicher (1782–1848), Danish author
- Steen Blicher (footballer) (1923–2018), Danish association football player
- Steen Steensen Blicher (footballer) (1899–1965), Danish association football player
- Steen Due (1898–1974), Danish field hockey player
- Steen Fenrich (1981–1999), African-American murder victim
- Steen Fladberg (born 1956), Danish badminton player
- Steen Lund Hansen (born 1943), Danish sprint canoeist
- Steen Herschend (1888–1976), Danish sailor
- Steen Hildebrandt (born in 1944), Danish academic and author
- Steen Krarup Jensen (born 1950), Danish sculptor, poet, songwriter and social critic
- Steen Rømer Larsen (born 1949), Danish association football player
- Steen Mastrup (born 1958), Danish motorcycle speedway rider
- Steen Miles (1946-2017), American politician
- Steen Nedergaard (born 1970), Danish association football player
- Steen Ottesen Brahe (landowner), Danish politician
- Steen Pade (born 1956), Danish composer
- Steen Raskopoulos (born 1987), Australian comedian, actor and improviser
- Steen Rasmussen (physicist) (born 1955), Danish physicist
- Steen Eiler Rasmussen (1898–1990), Danish architect and urban planner
- Steen Secher (born 1959), Danish sailor
- Steen Skovgaard (born 1950), Danish badminton player
- Steen Smidt-Jensen (born 1945), Danish athlete
- Steen Spore (1938–2022), Danish official
- Steen Thychosen (born 1958), Danish association football player
- Steen Tinning (born 1962), Danish golfer
- Steen Willadsen (born 1943), Danish scientist
- Steen Tsibouris (born 2002), Greek powerlifter
