= Nikis Avenue =

Central waterfront avenue of Thessaloniki, Greece

Coordinates: 40.6305°N 22.9429°E

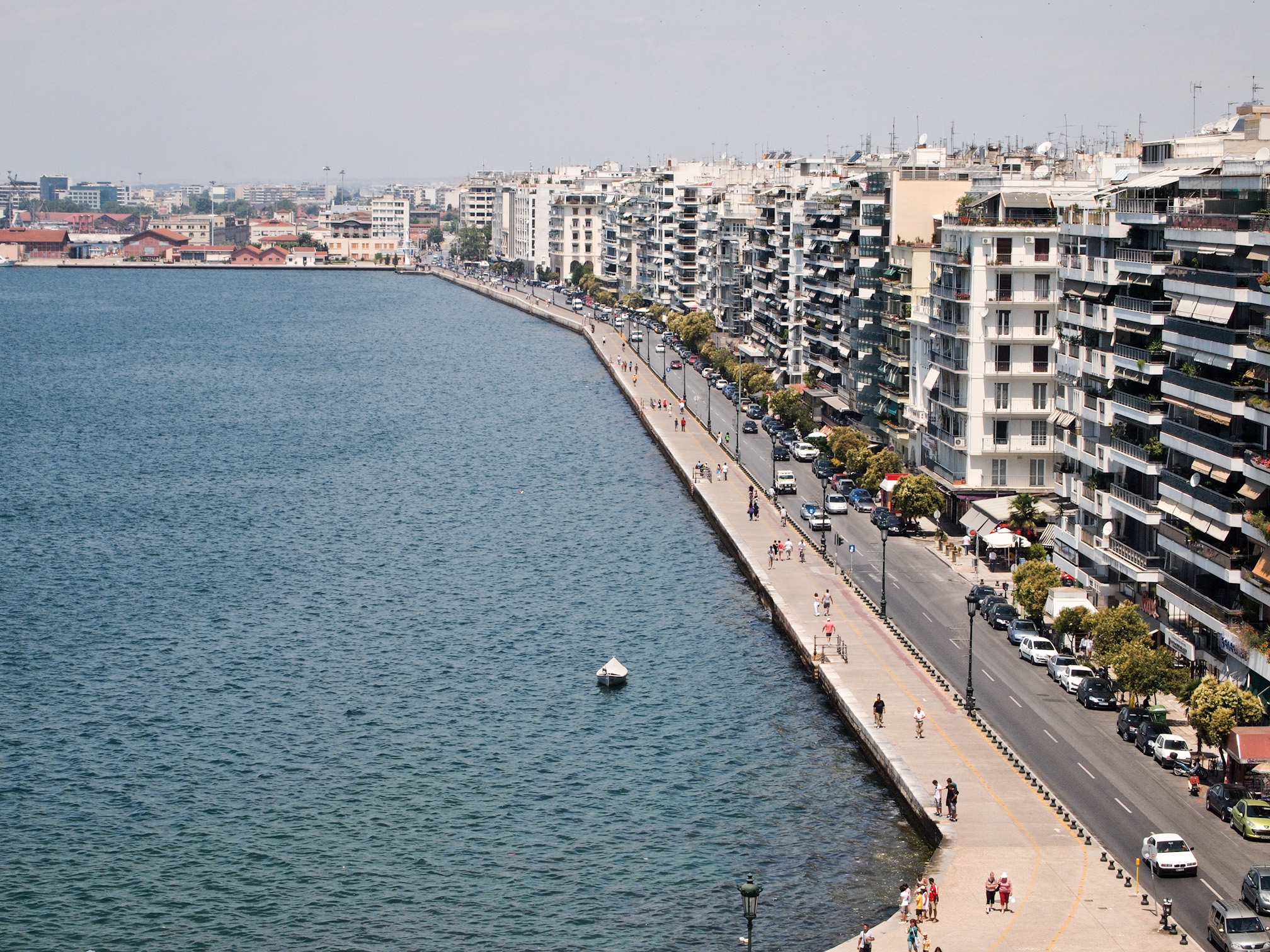
- Nikis Avenue
- Interactive map of Nikis Avenue
- Native name: Λεωφόρος Νίκης (Greek)
- Former name: Vasileos Konstantinou Avenue
- Namesake: Victory in the Balkan Wars
- Owner: Municipality of Thessaloniki
- Length: 1.3 km (0.81 mi)
- Location: Thessaloniki, Macedonia, Greece
- From: Eleftherias Square
- Major junctions: (Streets) Dragoumi, Venizelou, Komninon, Aristotelous, Karolou Diehl, Agias Sofias, Gounari, Mela
- To: White Tower

Nikis Avenue (Greek: Λεωφόρος Νίκης,Leofóros Níkis, trans. "Victory Avenue") is the central waterfront avenue in Thessaloniki, Greece. The three lane eastward avenue stretches from Eleftherias Square in the west, in front of Aristotelous Square to the White Tower in the east, where it meets with Alexander the Great Avenue. Leoforos Nikis is the busiest, most famous, most photographed and most painted street in Thessaloniki and has the highest residential property value in the city, and among the highest residential and commercial property values in Southeastern Europe.Nikis Avenue is also very important commercially, as it is lined with numerous cafés, restaurants and businesses and is frequented by thousands of tourists and locals every day. The consulates of Switzerland, Spain, the Czech Republic, Cyprus and the Philippines are located along the avenue.

== History ==
From the end of the 19th century until now the Avenue has changed names:

- Beyaz Kule Avenue in the Ottoman Empire until the liberation of the city by the Greek Army in 1912.
- Vasileos Konstantinou Avenue until 1939
- Nikis Avenue from 1939 until today

== Gallery ==
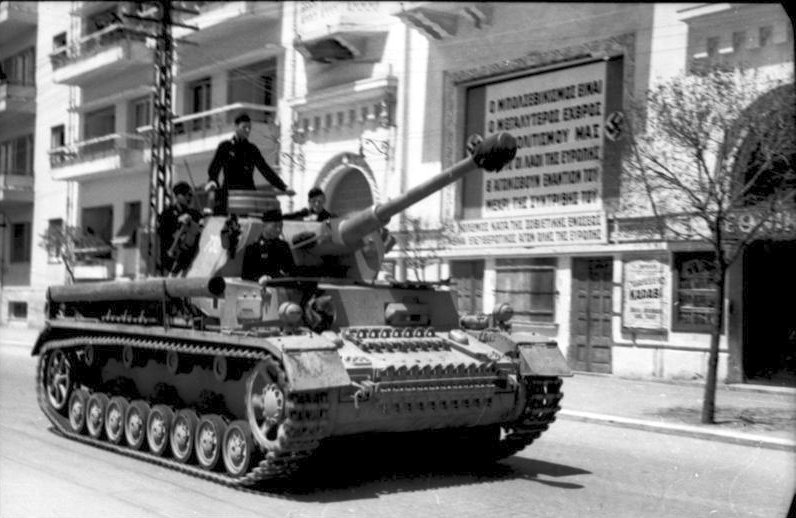
A German tank during WWII

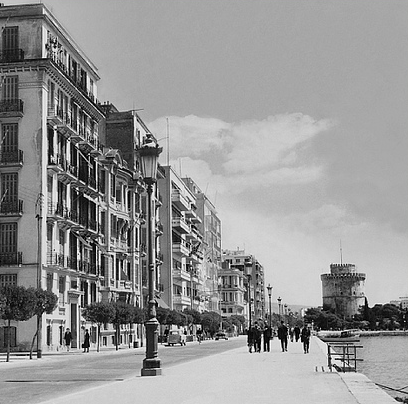
The seafront, 1960

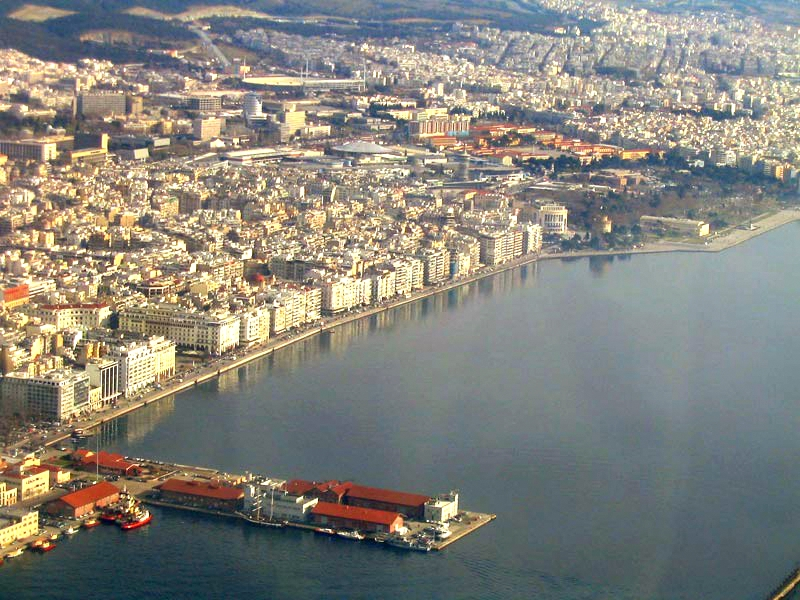
Aerial view of Nikis Avenue. On the left the port, on the right the white tower

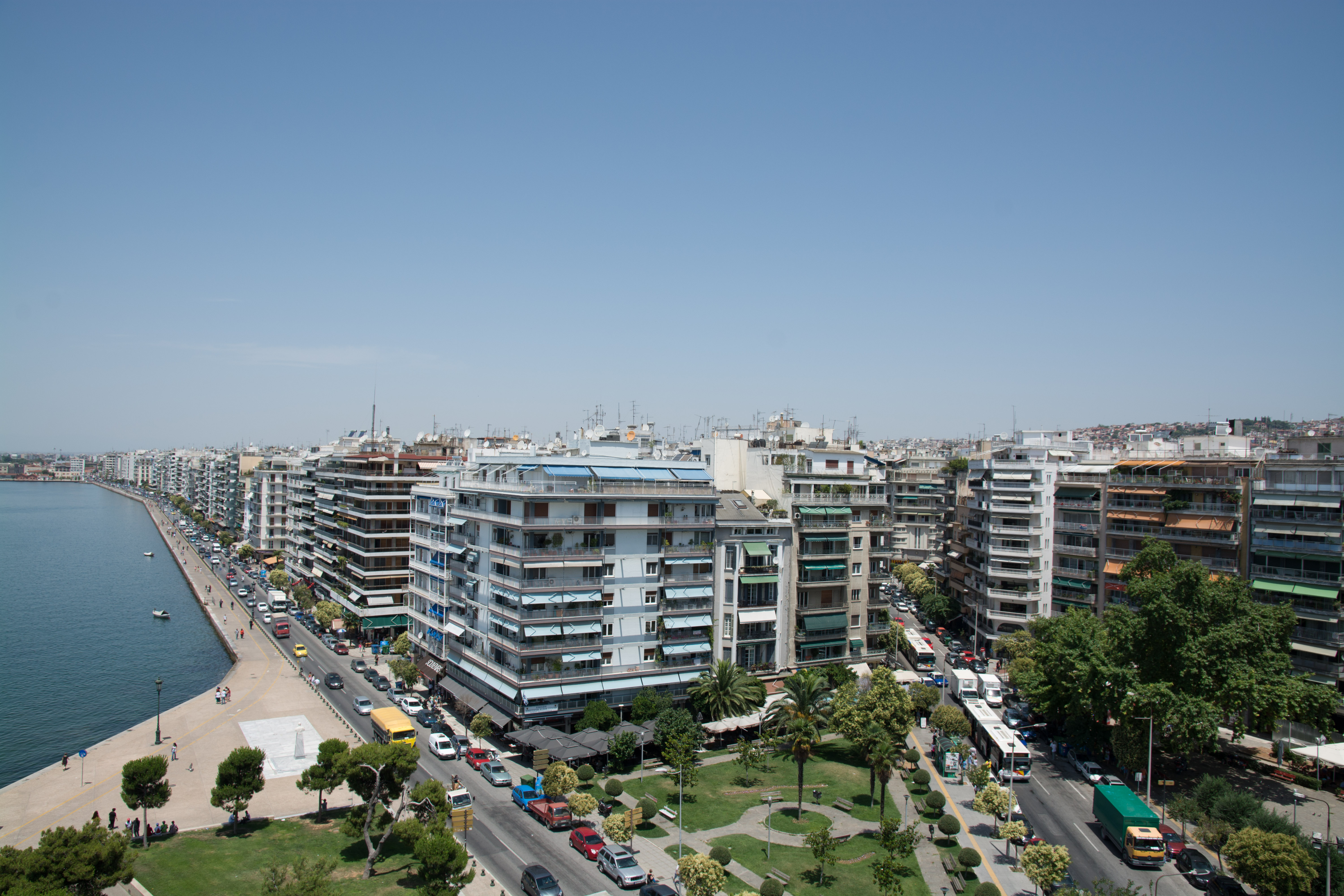
View from the white tower
