= Justice Stein =

Justice Stein may refer to:

- Gary Saul Stein (born 1933), associate justice of the Supreme Court of New Jersey, US
- Laura Stein (active since 1991), Australian judge, Chief Justice of the Supreme Court of South Australia
- Leslie Stein (born 1956), judge of the New York Court of Appeals, US
- Paul Stein (judge) (1939–2024), Australian lawyer and judge, an authority on environmental law

== See also ==
- Johan Steyn, Baron Steyn (1932–2017), Mr Justice Steyn when an English High Court judge
