= 1942 Eleftherias Square roundup =

Antisemitic measure taken in Salonica

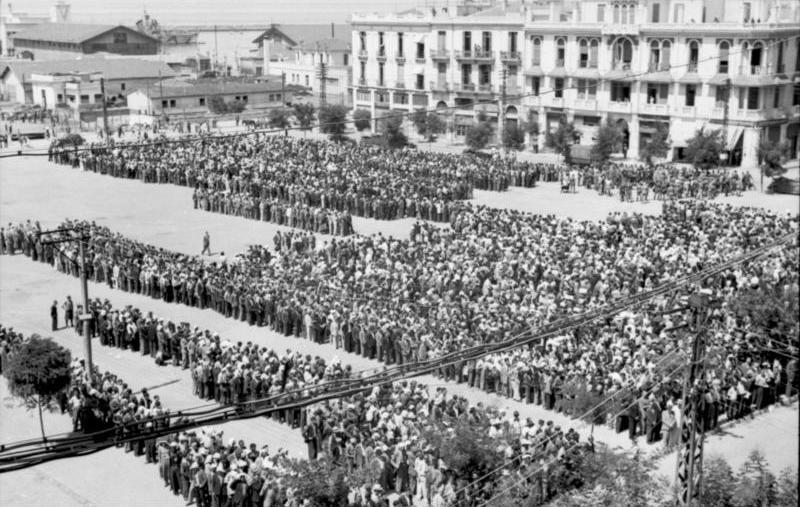
Photograph of the roundup

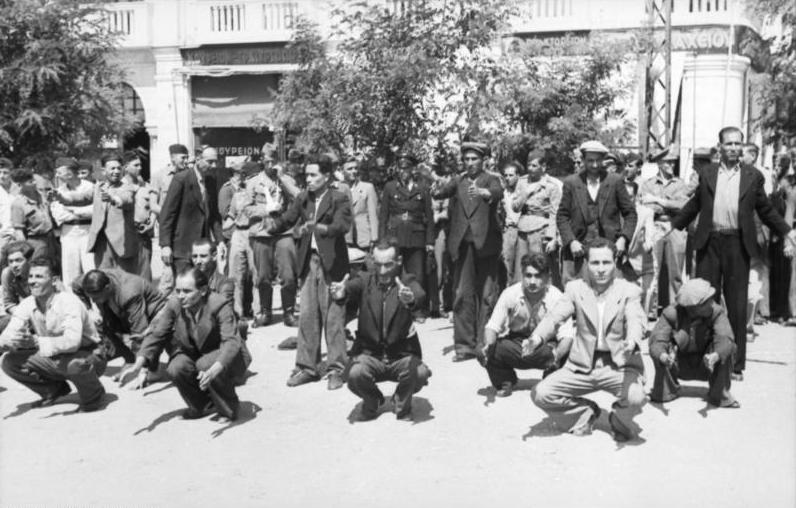
Greek Jews forced to do calisthenics

The 1942 Eleftherias Square roundup, sometimes called Black Sabbath (Greek: Μαύρο Σάββατο), occurred on Saturday, 11 July (the Jewish sabbath) and involved 9,000 Jewish men in Eleftherias Square in Salonica, northern Greece. Jointly organized by the German occupation authorities and the collaborationist Governorate-General of Macedonia, it was the first major antisemitic measure taken in Salonica following the 1941 Axis occupation of Greece.

The conscription of all Jewish men between the ages of 18 and 45 was announced on 7 July by Generalleutnant Kurt von Krenzki, the German commander in Salonica. The Reich Security Main Office (RSHA) stated that this decision was made in agreement with Vasilis Simonides, the governor-general of Macedonia. Simonides published his own version of the edict the same day, stating that Jews were a racial category (similar to the 1935 Nuremberg laws). The roundup was organized by the Governorate-General of Macedonia along with Greek police, discharged military officers, and doctors. Those who did not appear faced imprisonment in Pavlos Melas camp.

During the roundup, which began at 8:00 and lasted until 14:00, the Jews were forced to violate the Jewish holy day by performing calisthenics and rolling on the ground; many were beaten. Those who collapsed from the abuse were attacked by guard dogs or hosed with water and kicked until they stood up. Anyone who tried to protect himself from the sunlight was also beaten. Several Jews were injured and a few died. Both German Army and Navy units as well as the SS were involved in abusing Jews during the roundup. German actresses applauded and photographed the action from balconies above the square. Greek bystanders were reported to be indifferent or amused.

Following the action, René Burkhardt, the International Committee of the Red Cross representative in the city, attracted the attention of the Gestapo by asking for a list of those wounded. Registration was completed the following Monday. The collaborationist newspaper Nea Evropi ('New Europe') published photographs of the Jews' ordeal and reported that "non-Jewish spectators, gathered in the surrounding road ... had but one wish: that scenes such as the one they’d just seen would go on as long as possible".

In the following weeks, thousands of Salonica Jews were arrested for forced labor projects. A few white-collar workers were exempted from the forced labor measures. Some Jewish veterans of the Greco-Italian war managed to avoid it, as their employment was protected for one year after their discharge from the army.

The roundup is remembered as the beginning of the destruction of the Jewish community of Salonica. One survivor, Itzhak Nehama, recalled the roundup at the 1961 Eichmann trial in Jerusalem.

== See also ==
- The Holocaust in Greece

== Bibliography ==
- Apostolou, Andrew (2018). "Greek Collaboration in the Holocaust and the Course of the War". The Holocaust in Greece. Cambridge University Press. pp. 89–112. ISBN 978-1-108-47467-2.
- Bowman, Steven B. (2009). The Agony of Greek Jews, 1940–1945. Stanford University Press. ISBN 978-0-8047-7249-5.
- Chandrinos, Iason; Droumpouki, Anna Maria (2018). "The German Occupation and the Holocaust in Greece: A Survey". The Holocaust in Greece. Cambridge University Press. pp. 15–35. ISBN 978-1-108-47467-2.
- Fleming, Katherine Elizabeth (2008). Greece: A Jewish History. Princeton University Press. ISBN 978-0-691-10272-6.
- Saltiel, Leon (2019). "Dehumanizing the Dead: The Destruction of Thessaloniki's Jewish Cemetery". Microhistories of the Holocaust. Berghahn Books. pp. 68–84. ISBN 978-1-78920-054-6.
- Srougo, Shai (2020). "The Jewish workers in the port of Thessaloniki (1939-1943): Their war experience as workers, Greeks and Jews". Journal of Modern European History. 18 (3): 352–373. doi:10.1177/1611894420924909. S2CID 220588405.
