= Stine Baun Eriksen =

Danish handball player (born 1995)

Personal information
- Full name: Stine Baun Eriksen
- Nationality: Danish
- Born: 30 January 1995 (age 31) Randers, Denmark
- Height: 1.78 m (5 ft 10 in)

Sport
- Sport: Handball
- Position: Left Back
- Current club: Ringkøbing Håndbold
- Number: 24

Senior clubs
- Years: Team
- -2015: Hornbæk SF
- 2015-2017: SG BBM Bietigheim
- 2017-2019: Ringkøbing Håndbold
- 2019-: Skanderborg Håndbold

Stine Baun Eriksen (born 30 January 1995) is a Danish handball player who currently plays for Ringkøbing Håndbold.
