= Nandor Glid =

Yugoslav sculptor

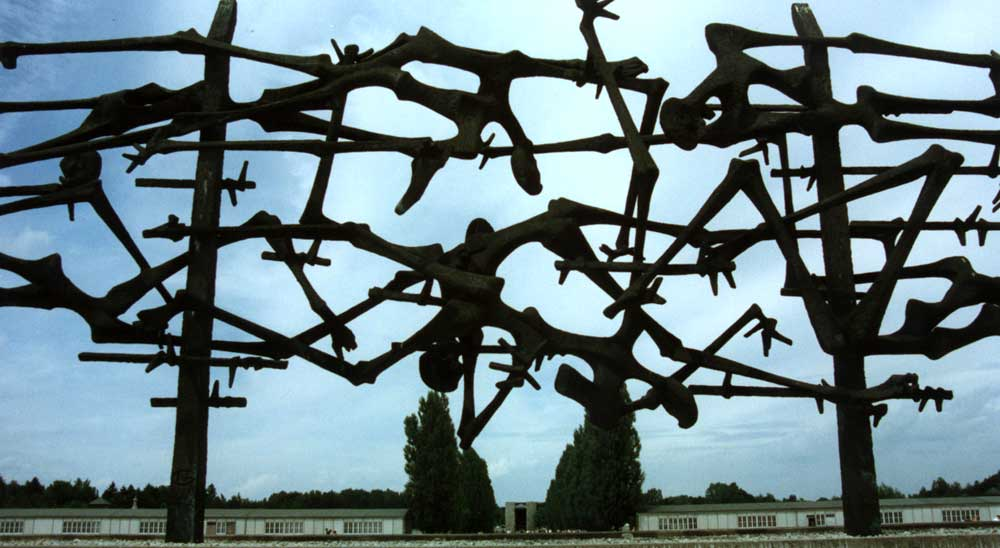
Dachau Memorial

Nandor Glid (12 December 1924 - 31 March 1997) was a Yugoslav sculptor, best known for designing the memorial sculpture at the Dachau concentration camp.

== Biography ==
Glid was a Holocaust survivor who had been a forced laborer and partisan during the war and whose father and most of his family were murdered in Auschwitz.

From 1985 to 1989 he was Rector of the University of Arts in Belgrade.

After the war, he created a number of monuments memorializing Holocaust victims, including the memorial at the Mauthausen concentration camp and the Dachau concentration camp, for which he won the international competition for the memorial sculpture in 1967.

In 1990, the city of Belgrade and the local Jewish community dedicated a memorial sculpture, Menora u plamenu (English: "Menorah in Flames") in the Dorćol quarter, which had been the Jewish quarter of Belgrade. The sculpture commemorates over 10,000 Serbian Jews, the vast majority from Belgrade, who were murdered by SS and Wehrmacht army units or deported to concentration camps during the Holocaust in Serbia.

In 1997, Glid began a sculpture for the Holocaust memorial to the Jews of Salonika, which was a variation on the Menorah in Flames, but he died before it was finished. His sons completed it after his death and it was subsequently unveiled in Thessaloniki, Greece.
