= Etz Chaim (disambiguation) =

Etz Chaim or Etz Hayim ("Tree of Life" in Hebrew) is a common term in used Judaism.

Eitz Chaim, Etz Chaim, Etz Hayim, or Etz Hayyim may also refer to:

- Tree of life (biblical), a mythical tree
- Tree of life (Kabbalah), a mystical symbol
- Etz Hayim (book), a 1573 Kabbalistic text by Hayim Vital
- Etz Hayim Humash, a Conservative Jewish Humash
- Etz Hayyim Synagogue in Chania
- Etz Chaim Synagogue in Portland
- Etz Chaim Synagogue (Athens)
- Etz Chaim Synagogue, Thanet

== See also ==
- Etz Ahayim Synagogue in Istanbul
- Etz Chaim Yeshiva (disambiguation)
