= George Sfougaras =

Contemporary British-Greek artist

George Sfougaras (born 1959) is a contemporary British Greek artist, based in Leicester, England; he works and exhibits internationally, in collaboration with a network of partners. His work is concerned with memory, identity, and the impact of history on the present; his printed works explore issues of human migration, change and cultural inheritance through representational art which draws on cultural symbols and archival research. He is a member of the Leicester Society of Artists and the Leicester Print Workshop. In 2017, he established the Focus on Identity International collective, a group of artists from various European and Middle Eastern countries.

== Early life and artistic themes ==
Sfougaras was born in Heraklion, Crete, to Christian parents who were refugees from Asia Minor (modern Turkey) and who subsequently came to the UK during the 1970s military Junta period; he says that these narratives form the cornerstone of his work. In his illustrated essay, Personal Maps, he describes the symbolism that characterises much of his work: boats are metaphors for change and transition, waves signify an arduous journey and trees stand for hope. His mother’s accounts of the transportation and loss of the island’s Jewish population inspired the book Tales from an Old Fort Town: a personal response to the Jewish History of Crete, and a permanent exhibition at Etz Hayyim Synagogue in Crete, in 2018. Sfougaras was invited on a residency to Chania in March 2019 to create a map of the former Jewish area of the city, incorporating the long-destroyed Neve Shalom, Chania’s second synagogue. His two subsequent installations for the Leicester Museum and Art Gallery deal with the horrors of war and forced migration. In 2021, in The Light in the Darkness exhibition in Leicester, Sfougaras presented two United Nations-style rescue tents, within which large transparencies of Jewish, Turkish, Greek, and Armenian refugees were illuminated by a rotating black box, simultaneously illuminating, and "retelling" the past. He later created a multi-site installation entitled In Remembrance, in the form of a film which depicts the turning pages of a large book containing extracts from two of his publications, Tales from an Old Fort Town and One Winter’s Night in Prague.

== Career and works ==
Sfougaras worked in the education sector. In 2014, while he was headteacher of the Children's Hospital School in Leicester, he led the school in the collaborative Learning at Home and the Hospital (LeHo) project, in partnership with hospital schools in six other countries. Here he also contributed to a project led by the University of Leicester on Mind, Body, Spirit: How museums impact health and wellbeing.

In Sfougaras' 2019 Arts Council-funded exhibition under the title of Recovered Histories, in partnership with the National Portrait Gallery, the Leicester Print Workshop, Leicester Museums, and ArtReach, he presented mixed media works, including banners, drawings, animated panels and prints based on his family’s experience of displacement and resettlement, making a connection with the on-going turmoil of global migration. The works were exhibited in the Leicester Cathedral and the Portsmouth Cathedral and in Leicester’s LCB Depot and other public spaces. For some of his prints, he worked closely with refugees and asylum seekers. For example, he worked with the Roots Group of refugees and asylum seekers in Leicester to create an exhibition in response to the concept of ‘Coming Home’ centred around the loan from the National Portrait Gallery of the Richard III portrait to Leicester, the place of the discovery of his remains and his eventual interment.

Sfougaras’s reinterpretation of the Knight, Death and the Devil by Dürer was purchased by Leicester Museums Trust in 2020 to be housed within the German Expressionist Gallery: he claims that the large pen and ink drawing focuses on the symbolism of the work, how elements have been subverted by political interests and superimpose new elements alluding to recent European history. In 2025, Leicester Museums and Galleries invited Sfougaras to revisit The Knight, Death and the Devil for Holocaust Memorial Day: through gallery talks and digital resources, he reconsidered Dürer’s image, its later political appropriation, and themes of displacement, persecution and moral responsibility.

Sfougaras has gained recognition for his reconstructed maps, narrative portraits and prints depicting migration. He was a prize winner in the Small Print International exhibition in 2016, and was shortlisted for the Freedom.org Depicting Human Rights exhibition in Washington DC. (2017).

Sfougaras has also contributed artwork and writing to publications concerned with higher education. His print Hope was used as the cover image of Higher Education for Good: Teaching and Learning Futures (Open Book Publishers, 2023), accompanied by his “Note from the artist”. In subsequent academic reviews of the volume, reviewers highlighted the centrality of Hope, its imagery of displacement and inclusion, and the contribution the artwork makes to the book’s social justice themes.

Sfougaras' 2023 essay, Accountable Spaces, was quoted in a discussion of creative collaboration and transformative educational practice. The authors identify Sfougaras as an artist and educator and use his discussion of creative partnerships directly within their argument about collaborative educational practice.

In 2026, Sfougaras' work took a new direction as he began developing software to support artists and writers with creative projects: he developed SafeRecall, a locally controlled system for preserving and retrieving AI conversations and associated digital material. The project was accepted as a submission to the OpenAI Build Week and was subsequently shortlisted for Most Innovative Platform/Software of the Year at the 2026 PICCASO Awards Europe in the Most Innovative Platform/Software of the Year category.

== Exhibitions and related works ==
Year	Title	Venue/ body/ publisher
2016	Tales from an Old Fort Town Book and exhibition	Etz Hayyim Synagogue in Chania
2016	Little Hope, winner of International Small Print prize, 2016	Leicester Print Workshop
2016	Smyrna	Midland Printmakers Open Exhibition: Ideas on Paper. The Malt Cross, Nottingham
2017	Established the Focus on Identity International Artists Cooperative	Focus on Identity website
2017	Personal Maps Solo exhibition	Alexandria Library Manchester
2017	Illustrations for Birds Without Sky, a poetry collection by Malka Al Haddad	Harriman House Ltd. Publishing House
2018	Works in Journeys to Home exhibition	Rugby Art Gallery and Museum
2018	Across the Seas: Screenprints and woodcuts	The Sam Scorer Gallery, Lincoln
2018	Contributor to Arċipelagu exhibition	International exhibition, Arċipelagu, curated by Raphael Vella, Malta.
2018	The Forgotten Conquerors book	Mehri Publishing House, London
2018	A Personal Map - artist's response to a novel by Trezza Azzopardi	Commissioned by Cardiff University
2019	Residency to reconstruct a map of the Jewish neighbourhood: Hania Jewish Quarter Virtual Tour	Etz Hayyim Synagogue
2019	Recovered Histories exhibition and public works	LCB Depot, Leicester
2019	Leicester Cathedral Banner	Leicester Cathedral
2019	Commission for De Lisle Catholic Academy	De Lisle College
2019	Talk at Leicester Cathedral: Unfolding Design	Leicester Cathedral
2019	WebinArt Interview with George Sfougaras in 7 parts	WebinArt Professional Development Programme by Creative Leicestershire
2020	Maps with Feelings. A visual way of connecting us from afar - materials for Digital Bible Week	Haus Ohrbeck, Osnabrück
2020	Holocaust Memorial Event Talk on The Knight, Death and the Devil Reinterpreted	Leicester Museum and Art Gallery
2020	Holocaust Memorial Flame Sculpture	Leicester Progressive Jewish Congregation
2021	Artworks for Leicester Art House 2021	Exhibition for Art House Leicester, held virtually due to pandemic restrictions
2021	Serious Games commission and exhibition for George Davies Medical Centre Gallery	University of Leicester and Attenborough Arts Centre
2021	Light in the Darkness exhibition	Leicester Museum and Art Gallery and the Unitarian Chapel in Leicester
2022	Cover and graphics for first edition of Other Side of Hope magazine	The Other Side of Hope Magazine
2022	In Remembrance: a Holocaust Memorial Day film	Leicester Museum and Art Gallery and Green Dragon Square
2022	An invited contributor to the Greek Government’s Project: 100 Memories	National Hellenic Research Foundation
2023	Artist Access to Art Colleges (AA2A) Artist in residence and Process Exhibition	Loughborough University
2023	Artworks for Art in the Courtyard Room, LCB Depot	LCB Depot, Leicester
2023	Artworks for the Cheshire Print Fair	Cheshire Print Fair
2023	Artworks for Leicester Art House 2023	Art House
2023	Kinesis Exhibition	The Gateway Gallery, Shrewsbury Arts Trail
2023	Hope, cover artwork and “Note from the artist” for Higher Education for Good: Teaching and Learning Futures	Open Book Publishers
2023	Illustrations for The Truth at the End of the Night, a poetry volume by Malka Al-Haddad	Palewell Press
2024	Istoria	The Giving Tree, Manchester
2024	Salt, selected for the Royal Society of Painter-Printmakers' Small but Mighty 2024 exhibition	Bankside Gallery, London
2025	Holocaust Memorial Day project revisiting The Knight, Death and the Devil	Leicester Museum and Art Gallery
2025	Sir Alec Jeffreys and DNA fingerprinting	Street Stories Leicester
