= Etz Chaim Yeshiva (disambiguation) =

Etz Chaim Yeshiva (Etz Chaim is Hebrew for "Tree of Life") may refer to several educational institutions (Hebrew: yeshiva):

- Etz Chaim Yeshiva (Brooklyn) (Boro Park)
- Etz Chaim Center for Jewish Learning
- Etz Chaim Yeshiva (Jerusalem)
- Etz Chaim Yeshiva (London)
- Etz Chaim Yeshiva (Maltsch)
- Etz Chaim Yeshiva (Manhattan) (See Yeshiva University)
- Etz Chaim Yeshiva (Toronto)
  - Eitz Chaim Schools
- Etz Chaim Yeshiva (Volozhin)
- Etz Chaim Yeshiva (Wilrijk)
- Etz Chaim Yeshiva (Slutsk, Kletsk)

== See also ==
- Etz Hayim (disambiguation)
