= Etz Chaim Synagogue (Athens) =

Orthodox synagogue in Athens, Greece

Etz Haim Synagogue
- Hebrew: בית כנסת עץ חיים
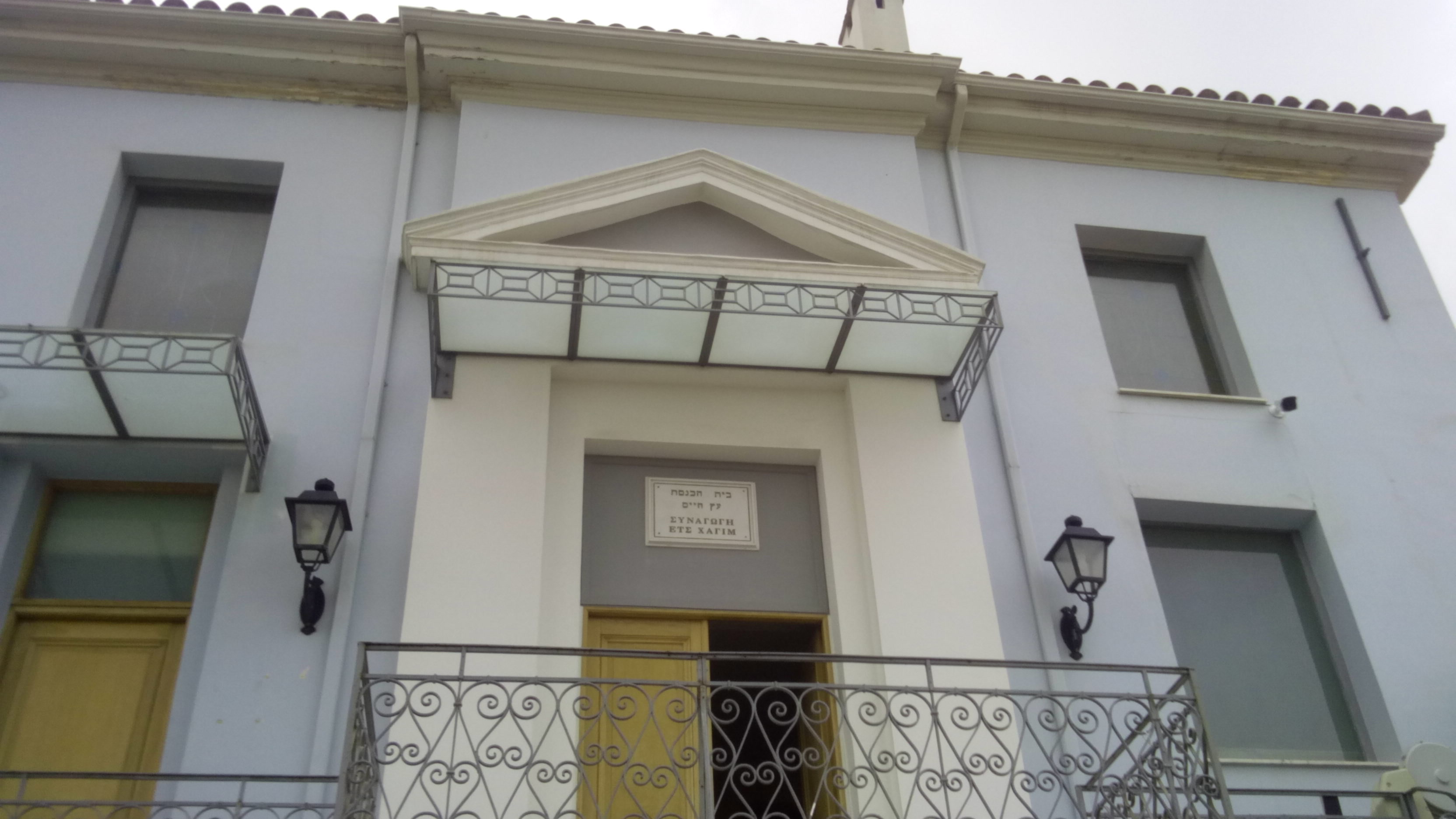
- The synagogue exterior in 2016

- Location of the synagogue in central Athens

Religion
- Affiliation: Orthodox Judaism
- Rite: Romaniote and Sephardi
- Ecclesiastical or organizational status: Synagogue
- Leadership: Rabbi Gabriel Negrin
- Status: Active

Location
- Location: 8 Melidoni Street, Athens 105 53
- Country: Greece
- Interactive map of Etz Haim Synagogue
- Coordinates: 37°58′42″N 23°43′10″E

Architecture
- Architect: Elias Messinas (2006)
- Type: Synagogue architecture
- Established: 1889 (as a congregation)
- Completed: 1904 (original); 2006 (reconstruction)
- Materials: Brick

The Etz Haim Synagogue (Hebrew: בית כנסת עץ חיים) is an Orthodox Jewish congregation and synagogue, located at Melidoni Street 8, in the Thiseio area of Athens, Greece. The synagogue was completed in 1904 by Greek Romaniote Jews who came from Ioannina, and for this reason it is also called the "Romanian" or "Yannonian" synagogue by the oldest members of the community. The synagogue is located across the street from the Beth Shalom Synagogue.

== History ==
The first Jewish Community of Athens in the modern era was formally established in 1889 and before the first congregation was built, informal galleys were operating, such as the house of the Yusurum family at the junction of Ermou and Karaiskakis streets, while another is testified that it was operating on Ivy Street.

The synagogue suffered serious damage from the 1999 earthquake, mainly on the roof, which was radically renovated in 2006 and officially opened on 30 June 2007 by the Jewish Community of Athens. However, due to renovation, architectural interventions took place inside it and this created objections.

The Etz Chaim Synagogue is used by the Jewish community for worship during the great religious celebrations only. All regular religious ceremonies are held in the Beth Shalom Synagogue. Both synagogues are led by Rabbi Gabriel Negrin, who was elected by the Council of Athens’ Jewish Community following the 2014 death of the longtime leader, Rabbi Jacob Arar.

== See also ==
- Judaism in Greece
- History of the Jews in Greece
