= Monastir Synagogue (Thessaloniki) =

Former Orthodox synagogue in Thessaloniki, Greece

- Hebrew: קהל קדוש מונאסטירליס
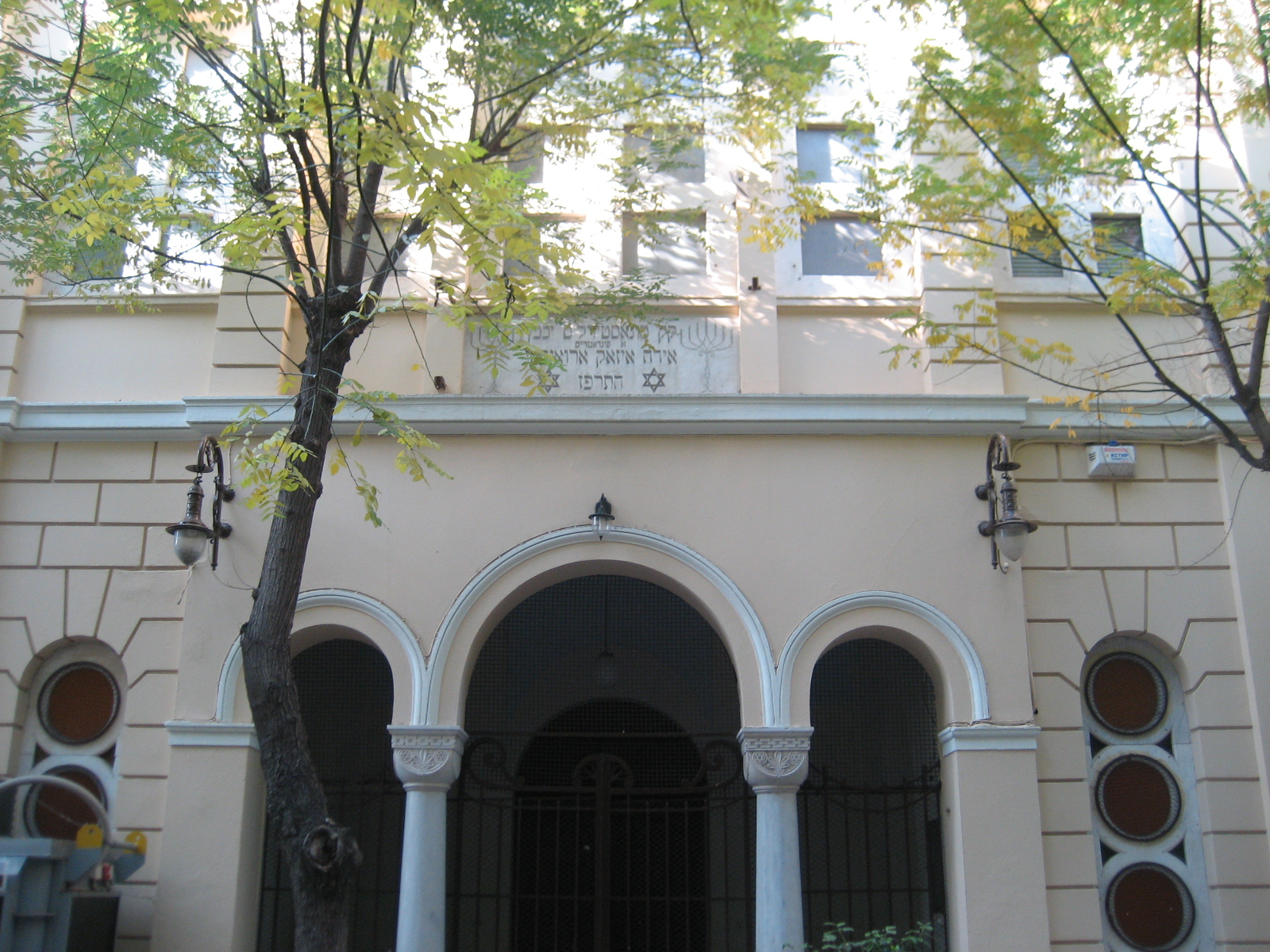
- Exterior of the former synagogue, in 2007

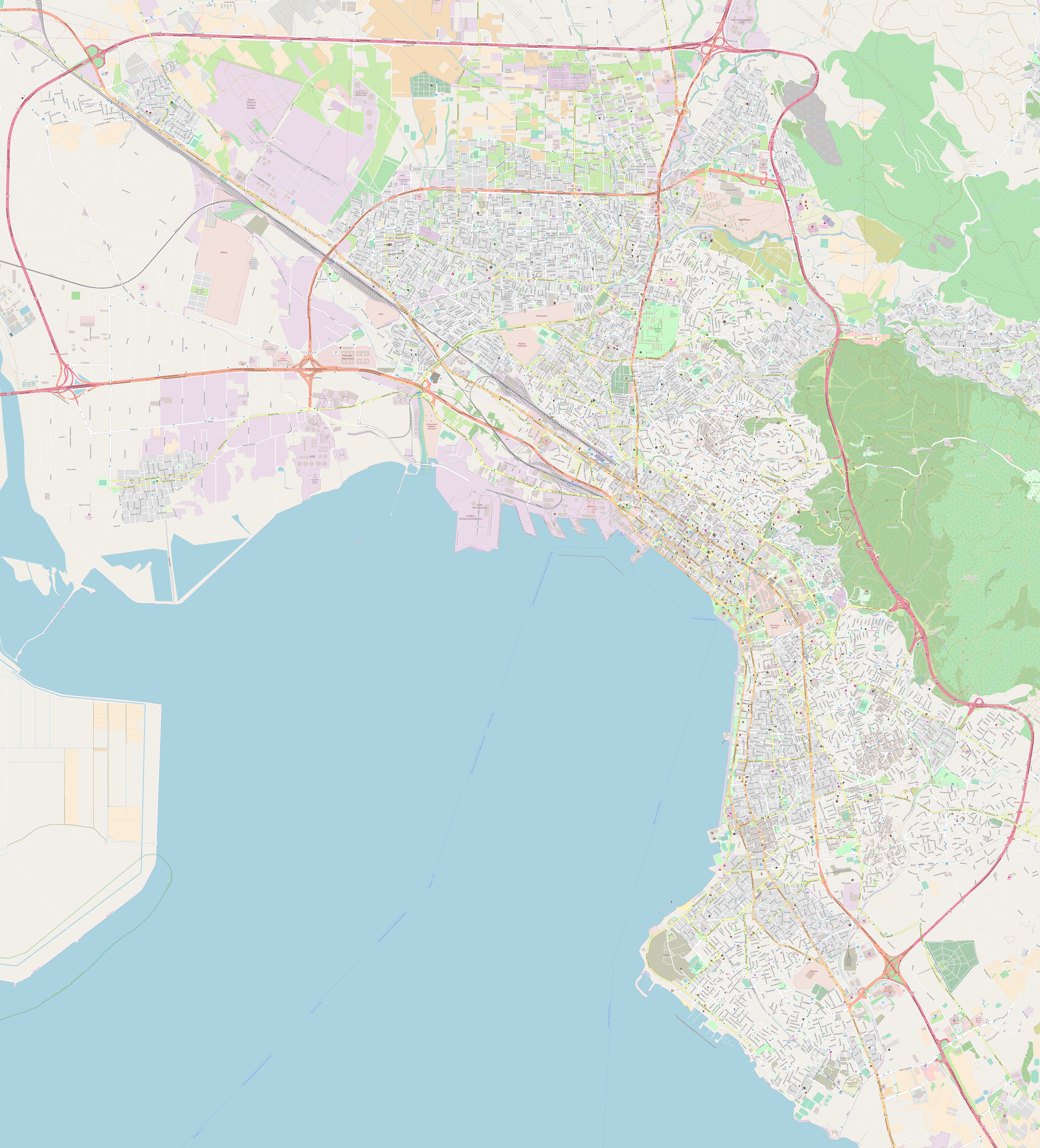
- Location of the synagogue in Thessaloniki

Religion
- Affiliation: Orthodox Judaism
- Ecclesiastical or organisational status: Synagogue
- Status: Active (on Jewish Holidays)

Location
- Location: 35 Sygrou Street, Thessaloniki
- Country: Greece
- Coordinates: 40°38′23″N 22°56′31″E

Architecture
- Architects: (Eli) Ernst Loewy (1927); Elias Messinas and KARD Architects (2016)
- Type: Synagogue architecture
- Style: Art Deco
- Funded by: Ida Aroesti
- Completed: 1927 (original); 1978, 2016 (reconstructions)
- Interior area: 260 square metres (2,800 sq ft)

The Monastir Synagogue (Hebrew: קהל קדוש מונאסטירליס; Judaeo-Spanish: Kal de los Monastirlis) is an Orthodox Jewish congregation and synagogue of the once vibrant Jewish community in Thessaloniki, Greece.

== History ==
Commenced in 1925, the synagogue was completed in 1927. The funding was provided by Jews from Monastir in the Kingdom of Yugoslavia, chiefly by Ida Aroesti, in the memory of her late husband Isaac, and the families Camhi, Joseph Nahmias, Massot, Barouch, Halevi, Israel, Calderon, Faradji, and Meir. The synagogue was designed by Ernst Loewy (1878-1943) from Buchau, in Austria-Hungary. Loewye was based in Karlsbad, Czechoslovakia, visiting Thessaloniki often as the engineer for the Austrian company that built that railway line between Thessaloniki and Vienna. Loewy moved to Thessaloniki in 1938. The consecration by the locum tenens Chief Rabbi of Thessaloniki, Haim Raphael Habib, took place on September 24, 1927 (Eloul 27, 5687).

Families fled Monastir during the Balkan Wars (1912-1913) and World War I and established themselves in Thessaloniki creating their own kehila (community) within the greater Jewish Community.

During World War II, the synagogue was saved by being requisitioned by the Red Cross. In June 1978, the structure of the building was severely damaged by an earthquake. It was restored by the Greek government and today is used primarily during the high holidays.

In 2016 the historic restoration of the synagogue was completed by architect Elias Messinas and KARD Architects, Dimitris Raidis and Alexandros Kouloukouris.

The synagogue is in function every Friday night and Saturday morning for Shabbat prayers, and services are held on Jewish holidays and especially the Days of Awe from Rosh Hashanah to Yom Kippur. There is a new synagogue shared with the Rabbinate and the offices of the Jewish Community of Thessaloniki at Tsimiski Street downtown. The Jewish Museum of Thessaloniki is also near the Tsimiski Street location.

== See also ==
- Judaism in Greece
- History of the Jews in Thessaloniki
- History of the Jews in Monastir
