= Shlomo Porter =

American rabbi

Rabbi Shlomo Porter was the executive director of the Etz Chaim Center for Jewish Learning. He was a past president of AJOP (Association for Jewish Outreach Professionals), and also served as an AJOP trustee since its founding in 1985. Until his death in 2025 Rabbi Porter resided with his wife Shoshana (Ungar) Porter in Baltimore, Maryland.

== Biography ==
Rabbi Porter was originally from Milwaukee, Wisconsin, where he was raised by his parents who began their life anew in America after spending World War II in the Jewish-Russian partisan movement.

Rabbi Porter's parents, together with his mentors, Rabbi Michel and Rebbetzin Feige Twerski, had a profound influence on his life and encouraged him to attend Beis Medrash L'Torah, a yeshiva high school in Skokie, Illinois. Afterwards, Rabbi Porter spent thirteen years at the Ner Israel Rabbinical College in Baltimore, and then going on to Loyola College to receive his master's degree in counseling.

From 1974 to 1977, Rabbi Porter organized SEED (Summer Educational and Enrichment Development) programs in Milwaukee. The Porter family moved to Santa Clara, California, so that Rabbi Porter could teach and administer Yeshiva and Medrasha Kerem (a high school for young men and women that combined outreach and Torah learning). In 1981, Rabbi Porter moved back to Baltimore to expand and direct the Etz Chaim Center of Jewish Studies, a multi-level program of outreach and adult learning which has reached over 10,000 Jews of every affiliation. Over the years The Etz Chaim Center of Jewish Learning has grown and presently has a Russian division, a college outreach program, advanced women's program, two centers in Baltimore, and two branches in Washington and Philadelphia.

Rabbi Porter died on November 15, 2025.
