= History of the Jews in Greece =

Greek Jews Έλληνες Εβραίοι יהודים יוונים
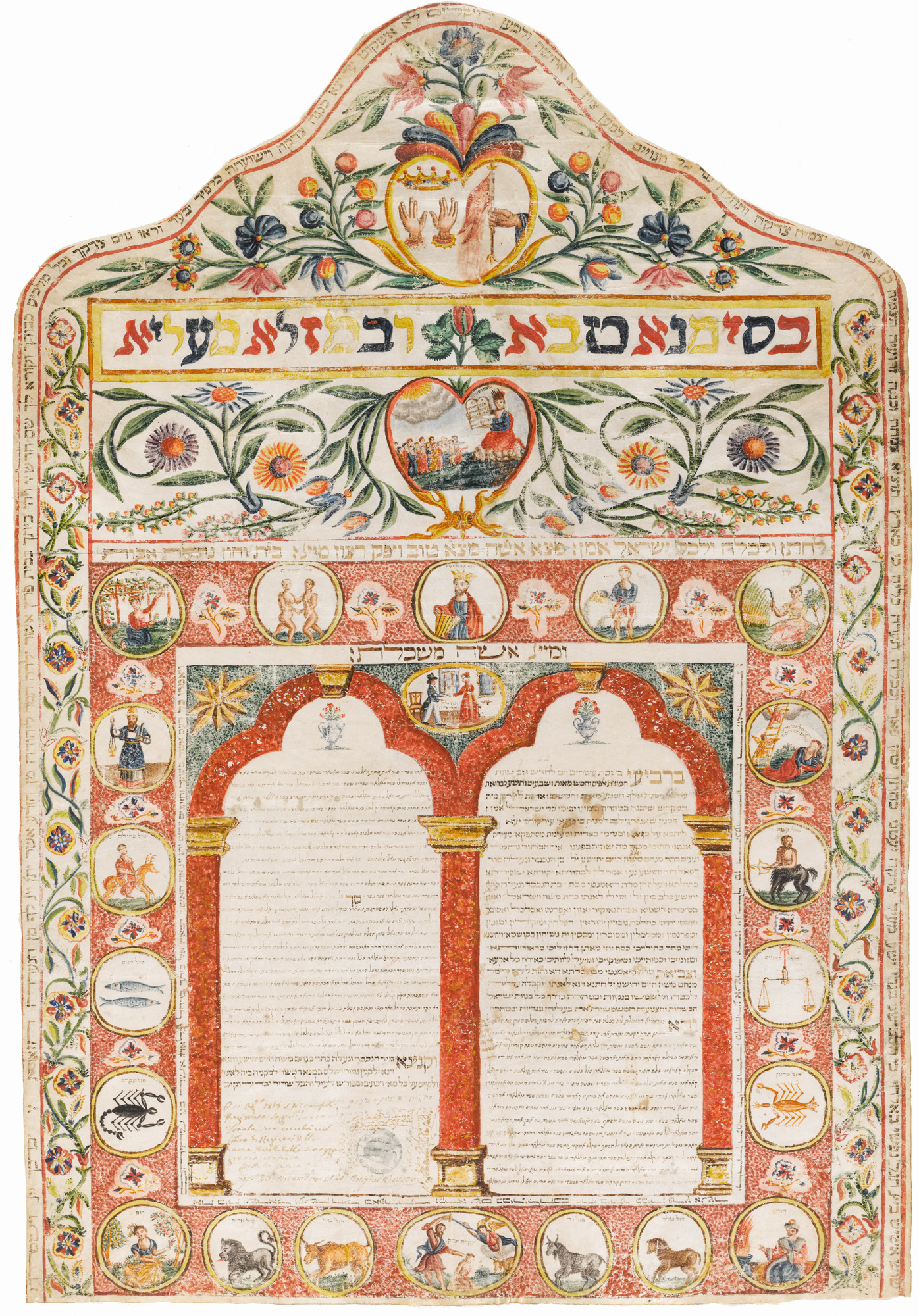

Total population
- 4,500

Languages
- Greek, Hebrew, Judaeo-Spanish, Yevanic (historically), Turkish

Religion
- Judaism

The location of Greece (dark green) in the European Union

The history of the Jews in Greece can be traced back to at least the fourth century BCE. The oldest and the most characteristic Jewish group that has inhabited Greece are the Romaniotes, also known as "Greek Jews." The term "Greek Jew" is predominantly used for any Jew that lives in or originates from the modern region of Greece.

Aside from the Romaniotes, a distinct Jewish population that historically lived in communities throughout Greece and neighboring areas with large Greek populations, Greece had a large population of Sephardi Jews, and is a historical center of Sephardic life; the city of Salonica or Thessaloniki, in Greek Macedonia, was called the "Mother of Israel." Greek Jews played an important role in the early development of Christianity, and became a source of education and commerce for the Byzantine Empire and throughout the period of Ottoman Greece, until suffering devastation in the Holocaust after Greece was conquered and occupied by the Axis powers. Despite efforts by Greeks to protect them, some 4,000 Jews were deported from the Bulgarian occupation zone to the Treblinka extermination camp. In the aftermath of the Holocaust, a large percentage of the surviving community emigrated to Israel or the United States.

As of 2019 the Jewish community in Greece amounts to about 6,000 people out of a population of 10.8 million, concentrated mainly in Athens, Thessaloniki (or Salonika in Judeo-Spanish), Larissa, Volos, Chalkis, Ioannina, Trikala, Corfu and a functioning synagogue on Crete, while very few remain in Kavala and Rhodes. Greek Jews today largely "live side by side in harmony" with Christian Greeks, according to Giorgo Romaio, president of the Greek Committee for the Jewish Museum of Greece, while nevertheless continuing to work with other Greeks, and Jews worldwide, to combat any rise of anti-Semitism in Greece. Currently the Jewish community of Greece makes great efforts to establish a Holocaust museum in the country. A permanent pavilion about the Holocaust of Greek Jews in KZ Auschwitz shall be installed. A delegation and the president of the Jewish communities of Greece met in November 2016 with Greek politicians and asked them for support in their demand to get back the community archives of the Jewish community of Thessaloniki from Moscow.

Independent candidate Moses Elisaf, a 65-year-old doctor, is believed to be the first Jew elected mayor in Greece. He was elected in June 2019.

== Jewish cultures in Greece ==
Most Jews in Greece are Sephardic, but Greece is also the home of the unique Romaniote culture. Besides the Sephardim and the Romaniotes, some Northern-Italian, Sicilian, Apulian, Provençal, Mizrahi and small Ashkenazi communities have existed as well, in Thessaloniki and elsewhere. All these communities had not only their own custom (minhag), they also had their own siddurim printed for the congregations in Greece. The large variety of Jewish customs in Greece was unique.

=== Romaniotes ===
Romaniote Jews have lived in the territory of today's Greece for more than 2000 years. Their historic language was Yevanic, a dialect of the Greek language, but Yevanic has no surviving speakers recorded; today's Greek Romaniotes speak Greek. Large communities were located in Ioannina, Thebes, Chalcis, Corfu, Arta, Corinth and on the islands of Lesbos, Chios, Samos, Rhodes, and Cyprus, among others. The Romaniotes are historically distinct from the Sephardim, some of whom settled in Greece after the 1492 expulsion of the Jews from Spain. All but a small number of the Romaniotes of Ioannina, the largest remaining Romaniote community not assimilated into Sephardic culture, were killed in the Holocaust. Ioannina today has 35 living Romaniotes.

=== Sephardim in Greece ===
The majority of the Jews in Greece are Sephardim whose ancestors had left Spain, Portugal and Italy. They largely settled in cities such as Thessaloniki, the city which was to be named "Mother of Israel" in the years to come. The traditional language of Greek Sephardim was Judeo-Spanish, and, until the Holocaust, the community "was a unique blend of Ottoman, Balkan and Hispanic influences", well known for its level of education. The Foundation for the Advancement of Sephardic Studies and Culture calls Thessaloniki's Sephardic community "indisputably one of the most important ones in the world."

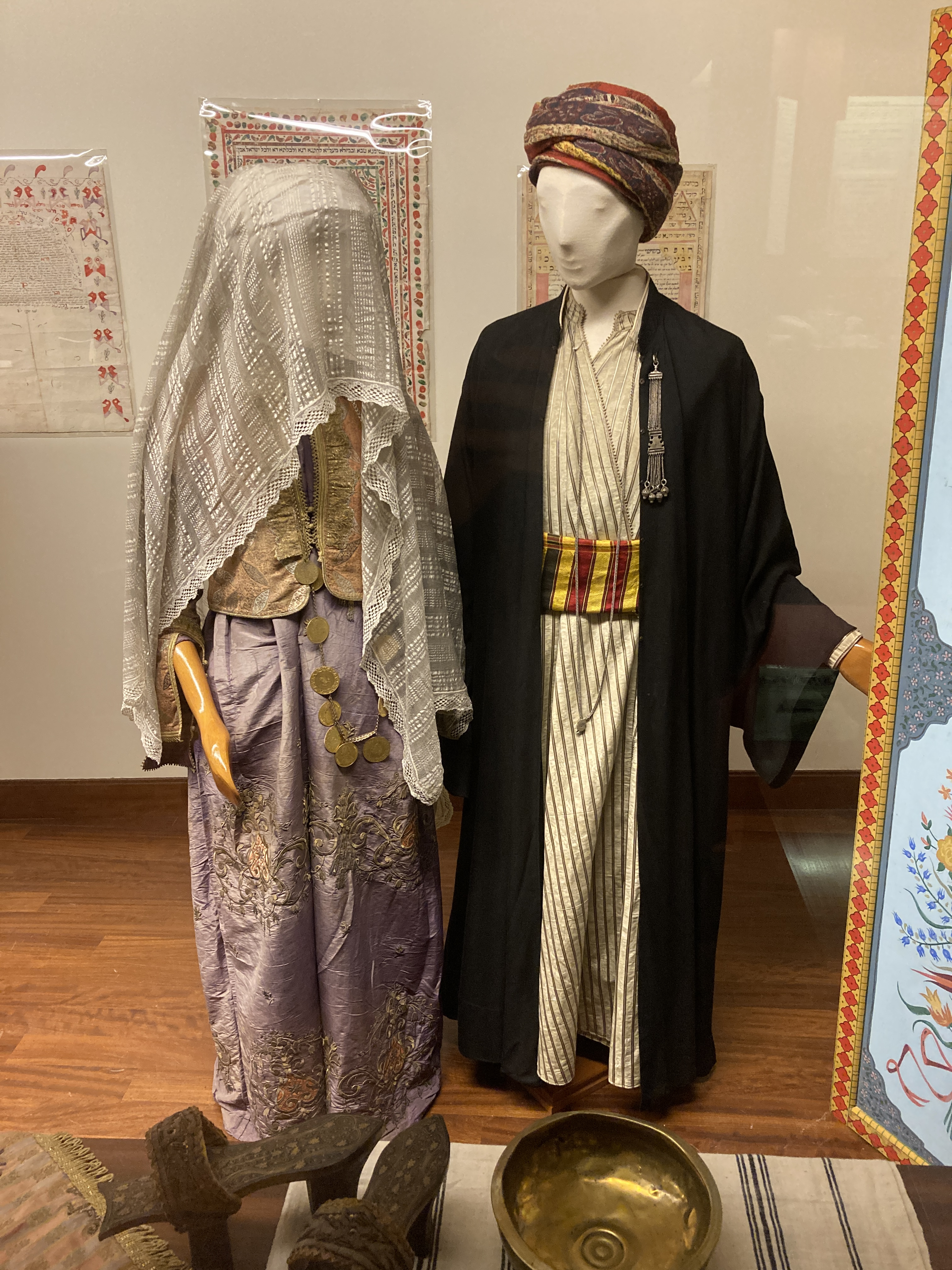
The wedding clothing of a Sepharadi Greek couple, ca. 19th century

== History of Judaism in Greece ==
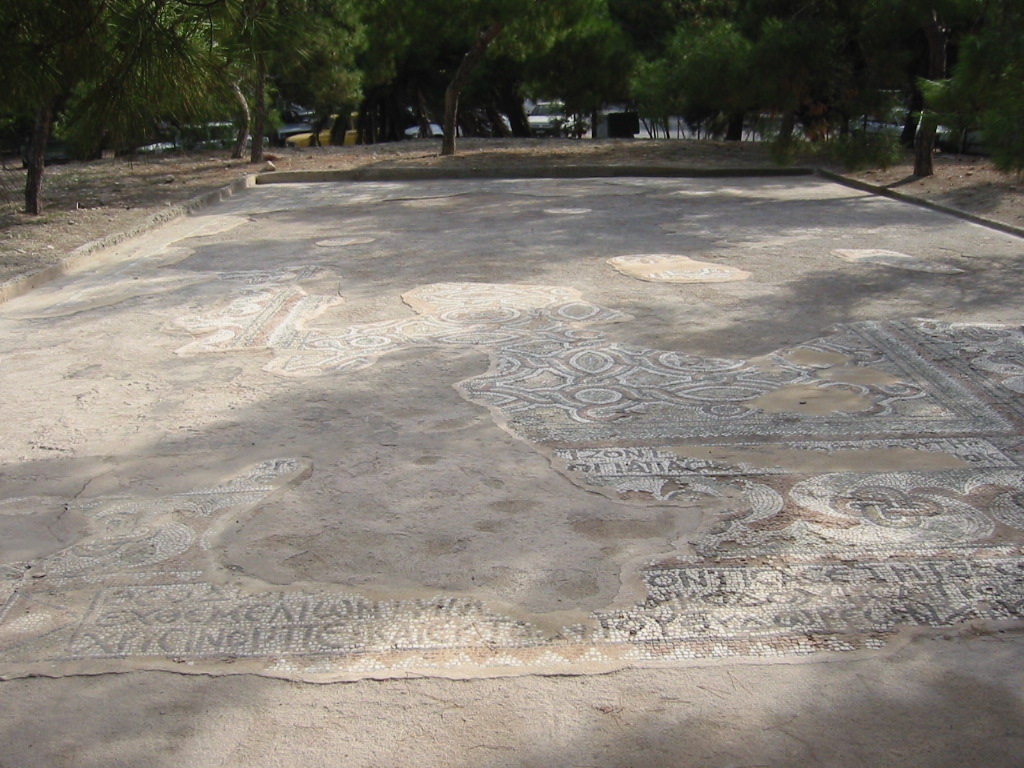
Mosaic floor of a synagogue in Aegina, Greece, 300 CE

Greek Jews played an important role in Greek history, from the early History of Christianity, through the Byzantine Empire and Ottoman Greece, until the tragic near-destruction of the community after Greece fell to Nazi Germany in World War II.

=== Hellenistic period ===
One of the earliest pieces of evidence for Jewish presence on the Greek mainland comes from Oropus in Boeotia, dating to around 300–250 BC. A manumission inscription found at the Amphiareion records the freeing of a slave named Moschos, whose father was identified as a Jew. Moschos participated in Greek religious incubation practices and invoked the names of Greek deities; yet, he affirmed his Jewish identity in the inscription. In the mid-2nd century BCE, inscriptions from Delphi mention the emancipation of several Jewish slaves, including a man identified simply as "Ioudaios" (Greek for "Jew") and a woman named Antigona and her two daughters. The latter family is described in the records as belonging to "the race (genos) of the Jews". It has been suggested that they may have been prisoners of war taken during the wars of the Maccabees.

In the 2nd century BC, Hyrcanus, a leader in the Jewish community of Athens, was honoured by the raising of a statue in the agora. A man named Simon, son of Ananias, appears in Athens, while two Jewish women, Heraclea and Marthina, are documented at Delos (as murdered). Delos is also the findspot of an inscription honoring Herod the Great, King of Judaea, as well as another honoring his son, the tetrarch Herod Antipas, located in the Temple of Apollo.

Archaeologists have discovered ancient synagogues in Greece, including the Synagogue in the Agora of Athens and the Delos Synagogue, dating to the 2nd century BC.

The Jews of Alexandria created a "unique fusion of Greek and Jewish culture", while the Jews of Jerusalem were divided between conservative and pro-Hellene factions. Along with the influence of this Hellenistic fusion on the Jews who had found themselves part of a Greek empire, Karen Armstrong argues that the turbulence of the period between the death of Alexander and the 2nd century BCE led to a resurgence of Jewish messianism, which would inspire revolutionary sentiment when Jerusalem became part of the Roman Empire.

According to Josephus (Contra Apionem, I, 176–183), an even earlier mention of a Hellenized Jew by a Greek writer was to be found in the work "De Somno" (not extant) by the 4th-century BC Greek historian Clearchus of Soli. Here Clearchus describes the meeting between Aristotle (who lived in the 4th century BCE) and a Jew in Asia Minor, who was fluent in Greek language and thought:

"'Well', said Aristotle, [...] 'the man was a Jew of Coele Syria (modern Lebanon). These Jews were derived from the Indian philosophers, and were called by the Indians Kalani. Now this man, who entertained a large circle of friends and was on his way from the interior to the coast, not only spoke Greek but had the soul of a Greek. During my stay in Asia, he visited the same places as I did, and came to converse with me and some other scholars, to test our learning. But as one who had been intimate with many cultivated persons, it was rather he who imparted to us something of his own.'"

=== Roman Greece ===
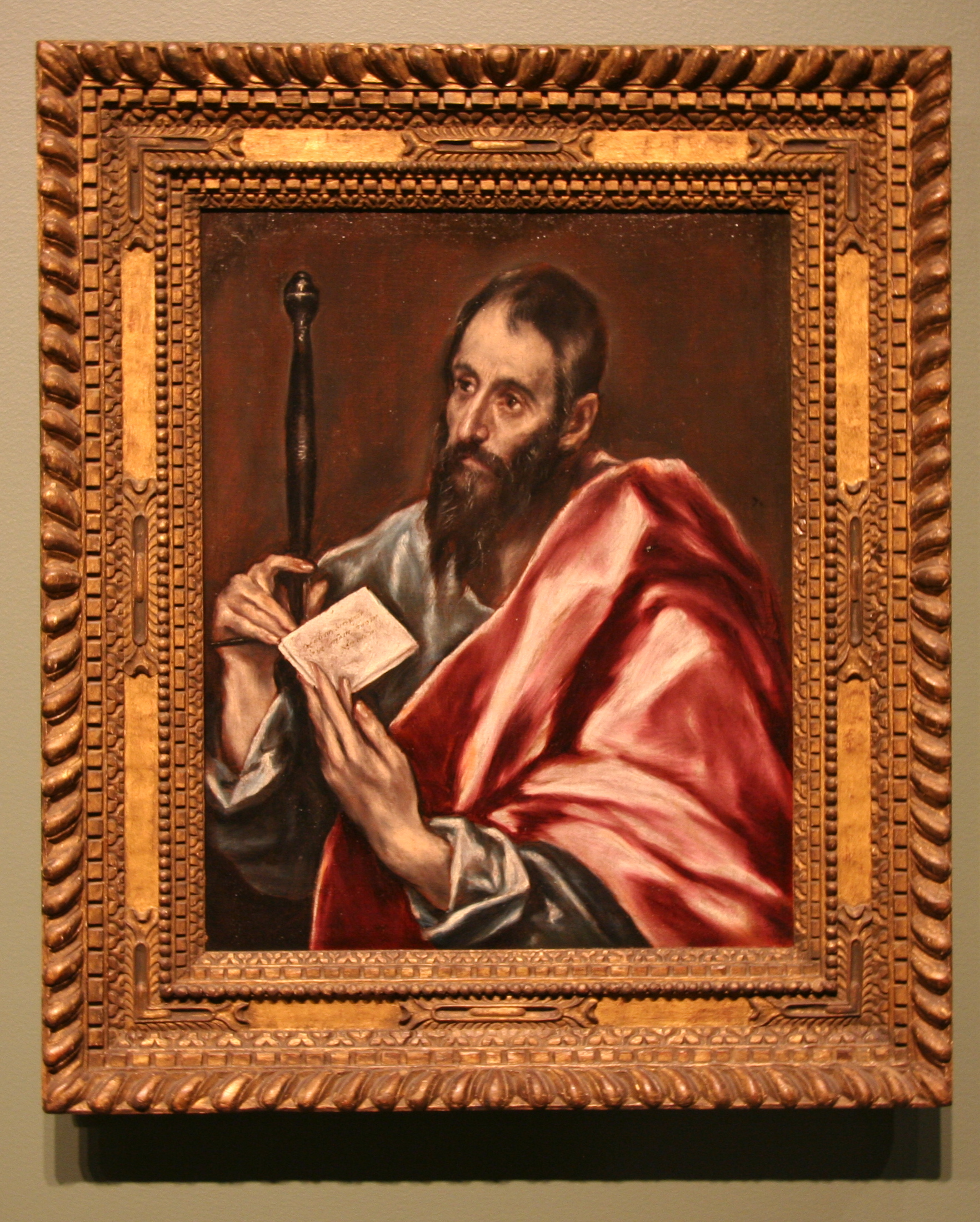
Paul of Tarsus by El Greco.

Macedonia and the rest of Hellenistic Greece fell to the Roman Empire in 146 BC. The Jews living in Roman Greece had a different experience than those of Judaea Province. The New Testament describes Greek Jews as a separate community from the Jews of Judaea, and the Jews of Greece did not participate in the First Jewish-Roman War or later conflicts. The Jews of Thessaloniki, speaking a dialect of Greek, and living a Hellenized existence, were joined by a new Jewish colony in the 1st century AD. The Jews of Thessaloniki "enjoyed wide autonomy" in Roman times.

An epitaph found in Taenarum (modern Kyparissa) records a man named Justus, son of Andromache, from the city of Tiberias in Galilee. He is believed to have been a first- or second-generation refugee displaced from Judaea in the aftermath of the First Jewish Revolt.

Originally a persecutor of the early Jewish Christians until his conversion on the Road to Damascus, Paul of Tarsus, himself a Hellenized Jew from Tarsus, part of the post-Alexander the Great Greek Seleucid Empire, was instrumental in the founding of many Christian churches throughout Rome, including Asia Minor and Greece. Paul's second missionary journey included proselytizing at Thessaloniki's synagogue until driven out of the city by its Jewish community.

Evidence from the 2nd and 3rd centuries CE includes three inscriptions that combine menorah imagery with Hebrew and Semitic names, discovered in Athens, Arcadia and Plataea. This period displays a strengthening of Jewish identity through an onomastic shift: the increasing adoption of Hebrew names for children of parents with Greek names. This pattern is evidenced by names such as "Issachar son of Heraclides", and "Beniames son of Lachares".

=== Byzantine Empire ===
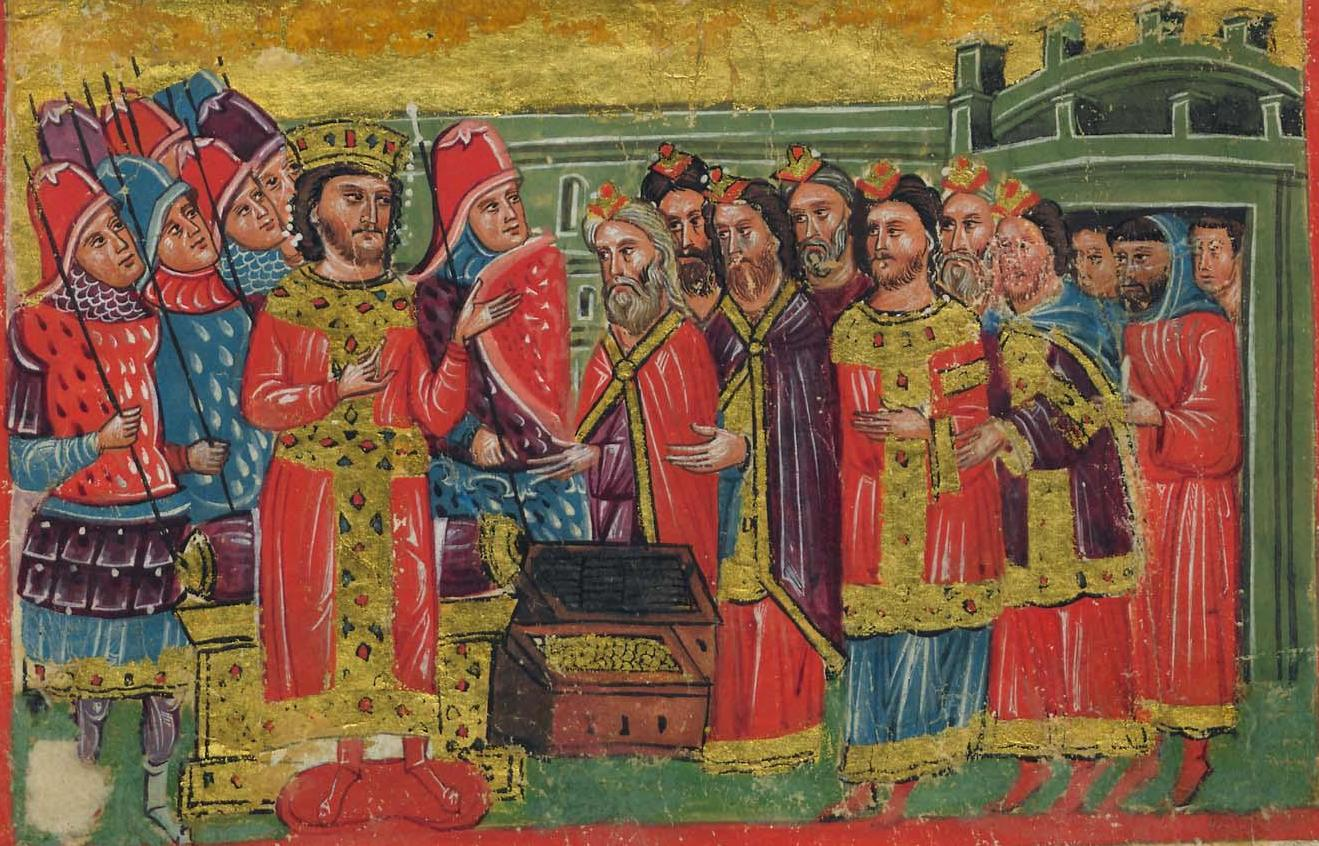
"Byzantine Emperor" Alexander the Great is offered gold and silver by the Rabbis in the 14th-century Trebizond Alexander Romance.

After the collapse of the Western Roman Empire, elements of Roman civilisation continued on in the Byzantine Empire. The Jews of Greece began to come under increasing attention from Byzantium's leadership in Constantinople. Some Byzantine emperors were anxious to exploit the wealth of the Jews of Greece, and imposed special taxes on them, while others attempted forced conversions to Christianity. The latter pressure met with little success, as it was resisted by both the Jewish community and by the Greek Christian synods.

The Sefer Yosippon was written down in the 10th century in the Byzantine south Italy by the Greek-speaking Jewish community there. Judah Leon ben Moses Mosconi, a Romaniote Jew from Achrida edited and expanded the Sefer Josippon later.

Tobiah ben Eliezer (טוביה בן אליעזר), a Talmudist and poet of the 11th century, worked and lived in the city of Kastoria. He is the author of the Lekach Tov, a midrashic commentary on the Pentateuch and the Five Megillot and also of some poems.

Spanish Jewish explorer Benjamin of Tudela visited Greece during his travels around 1161/1162 CE. After leaving southern Italy and sailing through the Adriatic Sea, he visited Corfu, Thebes, Almyros, and Thessaloniki, before moving on to Constantinople. In Thebes, he reported a Jewish population of 2,000, the largest Jewish community in any Byzantine city of the 12th century, after Constantinople, the empire's capital.

The first settlement of Ashkenazi Jews in Greece occurred in 1376, heralding an Ashkenazi immigration from Hungary and Germany to avoid the persecution of Jews throughout the 15th century. Jewish immigrants from France and Venice also arrived in Greece, and created new Jewish communities in Thessaloniki.

=== Frankokratia ===
The Fourth Crusade degraded the position of the Jews in the new Frankish lands on Greek ground which were formerly parts of the Byzantine Empire. The Jews were at that time economically powerful though small in number, comprised a community of their own, separately from the Christians, and dealt in money lending.

=== Ottoman Empire ===
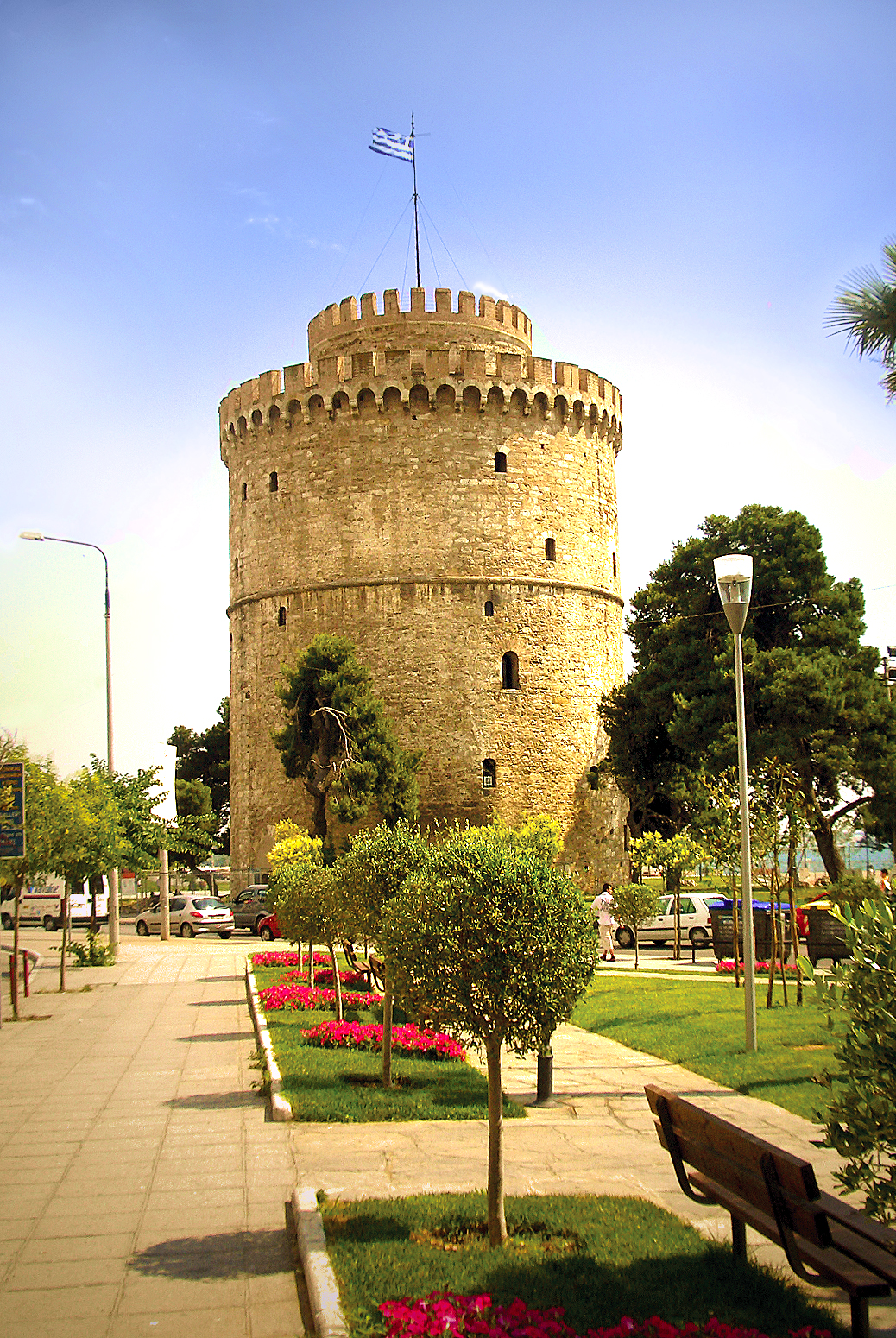
The White Tower of Thessaloniki, marking the southeastern edge of Jewish quarter of Thessaloniki, the Mother of Israel.

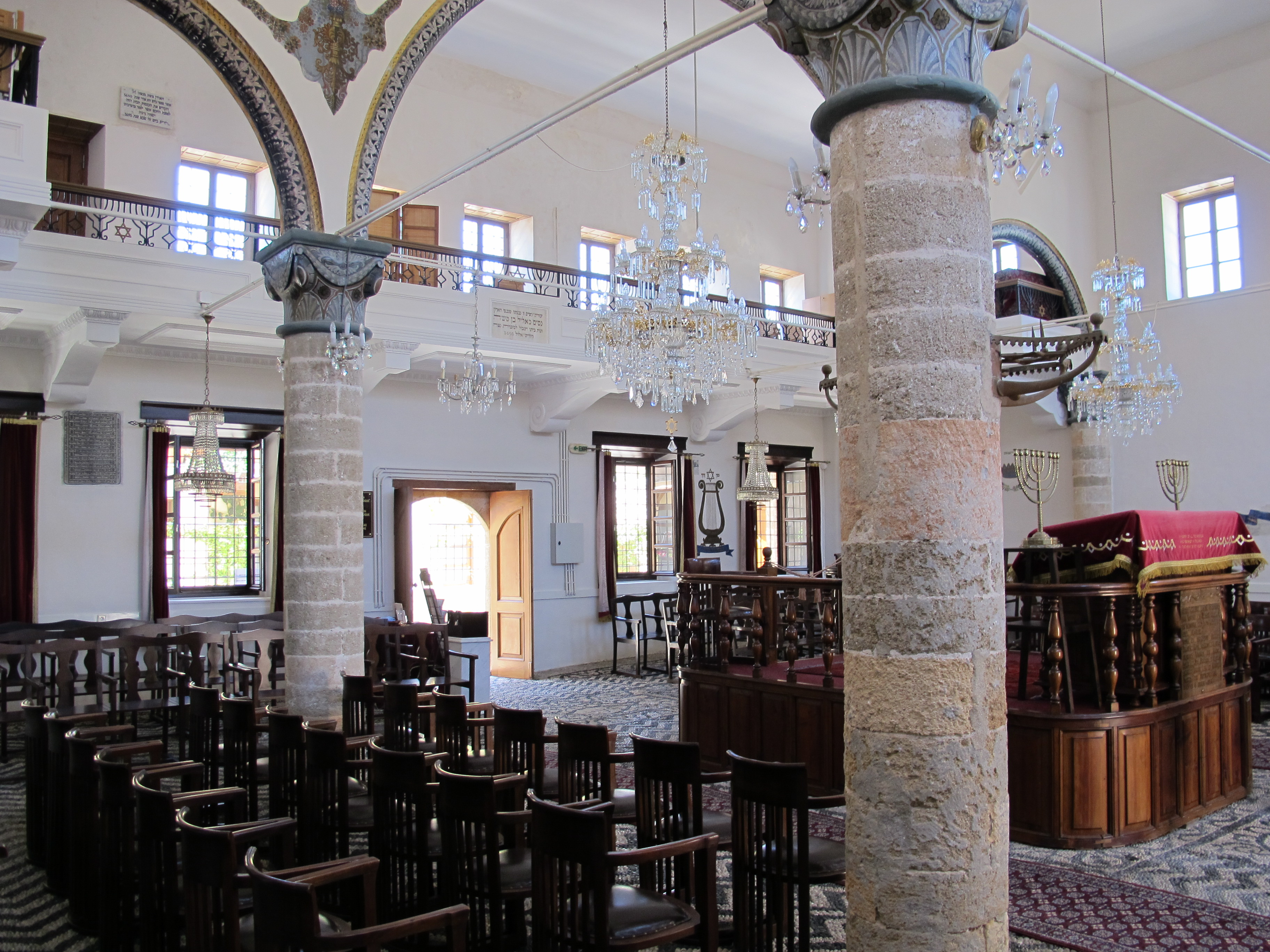
Interior of the Kahal Shalom Synagogue in Rhodes (city).

Greece was ruled by the Ottoman Empire from the mid-15th century, although pockets of Christian rule such as the Duchy of Naxos persisted for longer, until the conclusion of first the Greek War of Independence ending in 1832, and then the First Balkan War in 1913. During this period, the centre of Jewish life in the Balkans was Salonica or Thessaloniki. The Sephardim of Thessaloniki were the exclusive tailors for the Ottoman Janissaries, and enjoyed economic prosperity through commercial trading in the Balkans.

After the Alhambra Decree of 1492 expelled the Jewish community from Spain, between fifteen and twenty thousand Sephardic Jews settled in Thessaloniki (then Salonica). According to the Jewish Virtual Library: "Greece became a haven of religious tolerance for Jews fleeing the Spanish Inquisition and other persecution in Europe. The Ottomans welcomed the Jews because they improved the economy. Jews occupied administrative posts and played an important role in intellectual and commercial life throughout the empire." These immigrants established the city's first printing press, and the city became known as a centre for commerce and learning. The exile of other Jewish communities swelled the city's Jewish population, and in 1519, the Jews represented 56% of the population of Thessaloniki, and in 1613, their share was 68%. Ottoman Jews were obliged to pay special "Jewish taxes" to the Ottoman authorities. These taxes included the Cizye, the İspençe, the Haraç, and the Rav akçesi ("rabbi tax"). Sometimes, local rulers would also levy taxes for themselves, in addition to the taxes sent to the central authorities in Constantinople.

In the year 1523 the first printed edition of the Mahzor Romania was published in Venice, by Constantinopolitan Jews which contains the Minhag of the Jews from the Byzantine empire. This Minhag represents probably the oldest European Prayer rite. A polyglot edition of the Bible published in Constantinople in 1547 has the Hebrew text in the middle of the page, with a Judaeo-Spanish translation on one side and a Yevanic translation on the other.

Joseph Nasi, a Portuguese Marrano Jew, was appointed by the Sultan as Duke of the Archipelago, encompassing the Cyclades islands in Greece, for the years 1566–1579.

The Jewish community in Patras, which had existed since antiquity, left the city during the Ottoman–Venetian wars of the 17th century. However, following the Ottoman conquest of the city in 1715, Jews returned and lived there in relative peace.

The middle of the 19th century, however, brought a change to Greek Jewish life. The Janissaries had been destroyed in 1826, and traditional commercial routes were being encroached upon by the Great Powers of Europe. The Sephardic population of Thessaloniki had risen to between twenty-five and thirty thousand members, leading to scarcity of resources, fires and hygiene problems. The end of the century saw great improvements, as the mercantile leadership of the Sephardic community, particularly the Allatini family, took advantage of new trade opportunities with the rest of Europe. According to historian Misha Glenny, Thessaloniki was the only city in the Empire where some Jews "employed violence against the Christian population as a means of consolidating their political and economic power", as traders from the Jewish population closed their doors to traders from the Greek and Slav populations and physically intimidated their rivals. With the importation of modern anti-Semitism with immigrants from the West later in the century, moreover, some of Thessaloniki's Jews soon became the target of Greek and Armenian pogroms, and antisemitic incidents elsewhere in Greece such as the Rhodes blood libel of 1840 reflected tensions between the empire's Greek and Jewish communities.Thessaloniki's Jewish community comprised more than half of the city's population until the early 1900s. As a result of the Jewish influence on the city, many non-Jewish inhabitants of Thessaloniki spoke Judeo-Spanish, the language of the Sephardic Jews, and the city virtually shut down on Saturday, the Jewish Sabbath, given it sometimes the name of 'Little Jerusalem."

=== Independent Greece ===
In general loyal to the Ottoman Empire, the Jews of southern Greece did not have a positive stance towards the Greek War of Independence; so often they became also targets by the revolutionaries.

The Ottoman rule in Thessaloniki ended much later, in 1912, as Greek soldiers entered the city in the last days of the First Balkan War. Thessaloniki's status had not been decided by the Balkan Alliance before the war, and Glenny writes that some amongst the city's majority Jewish population at first hoped that the city might be controlled by Bulgaria. Bulgarian control would keep the city at the forefront of a national trade network, while Greek control might affect, for those of certain social classes and across ethnic groups, Thessaloniki's position as the destination of Balkan village trading. After the city was conquered by the Greeks in 1913, Thessaloniki Jews were accused of cooperating with the Turks and being traitors, and were subjected to pressure from the Greek army and local Greeks. As a result of the intense coverage of these pressures in the world press, the Venizelos government took a series of measures against antisemitic actions. After liberation, however, the Greek government won the support of the city's Jewish community, and Greece under Eleftherios Venizelos was one of the first countries to accept the Balfour Declaration.

In 1934, a large number of Jews from Thessaloniki made aliyah to Mandatory Palestine, settling in Tel Aviv and Haifa. Those who could not get past British immigration restrictions simply came on tourist visas and disappeared into Tel Aviv's Greek community. Among them were some 500 dockworkers and their families, who settled in Haifa to work at its newly constructed port.

Later, with the establishment in 1936 of the Metaxas regime, which was not typically hostile to Jews in general despite its fascist character, the stance of the Greek State towards the Jewish community was further improved.

=== World War II, Resistance and the Holocaust ===
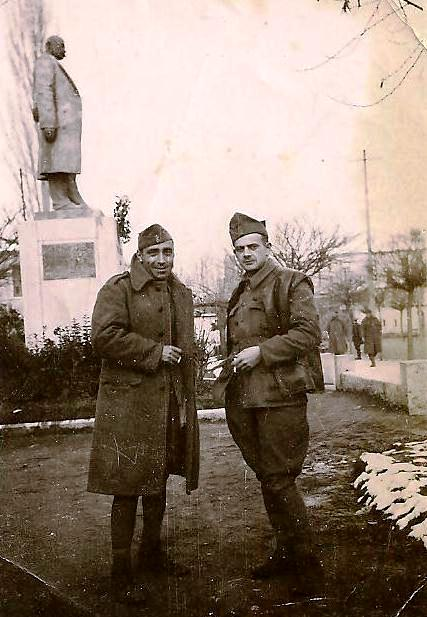
Jewish soldier (right) at the Albanian front during the Greco-Italian War.

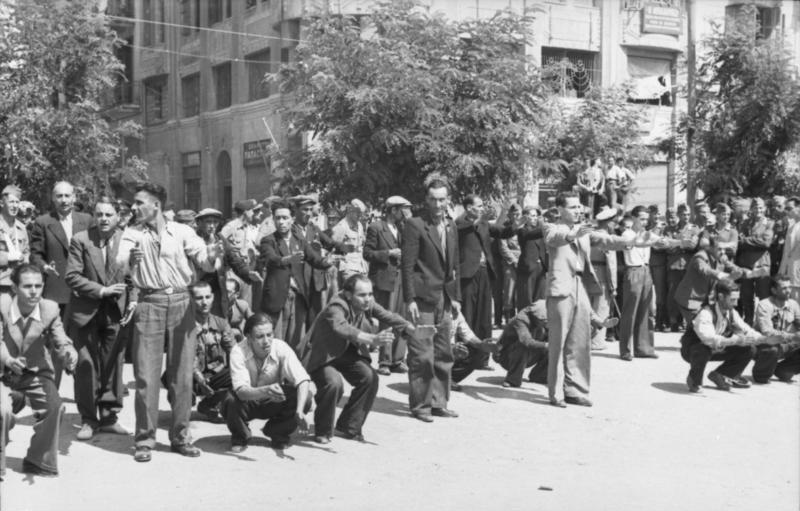
Greek Jews from Saloniki are forced to exercise or dance, July 1942.

During World War II, Greece was conquered by Nazi Germany and occupied by the Axis powers. 12,898 Greek Jews fought in the Greek army, one of the best-known amongst them being Colonel Mordechai Frizis, in a force which first successfully repelled the Italian Army, but was later overwhelmed by German forces. The Germans had been gathering intelligence on Salonica's Jewish community since 1937. Some 60,000-70,000 Greek Jews, or at least 81% of the country's Jewish population, were murdered; especially in jurisdictions occupied by Nazi Germany and Bulgaria. Although the Germans deported a great number of Greek Jews, some were successfully hidden by their Greek neighbours.

The losses were significant in places like Thessaloniki, Ioannina, Corfu or Rhodes, where most of the Jewish population were deported and killed. In contrast, larger percentages of Jews were able to survive, where the local population was helpful and hid the persecuted Jews, such as Athens, Larissa or Volos. Perhaps the most important rescue efforts took place in Athens, where some 1,200 Jews were given false identity cards following the efforts of Archbishop Damaskinos and police chief Angelos Ebert.

On July 11, 1942, the Jews of Thessaloniki were rounded up in preparation for slave labour. The community paid a fee of 2 billion drachmas for their freedom. Yet 50,000 people were sent to Auschwitz, and most of their 60 synagogues and schools were destroyed, along with the old Jewish cemetery in the center of the city. Only 1,950 survived. Many survivors later emigrated to Israel and the United States. Today the Jewish population of Thessaloniki numbers roughly 1,000, and maintains two synagogues.

General and Jewish population of Thessaloniki

Year	Total population	Jewish population	Jewish percentage
1842	70,000	36,000	51%
1870	90,000	50,000	56%
1882/84	85,000	48,000	56%
1902	126,000	62,000	49%
1913	157,889	61,439	39%
1943		53,000	
2000	363,987	1,400	0.3%

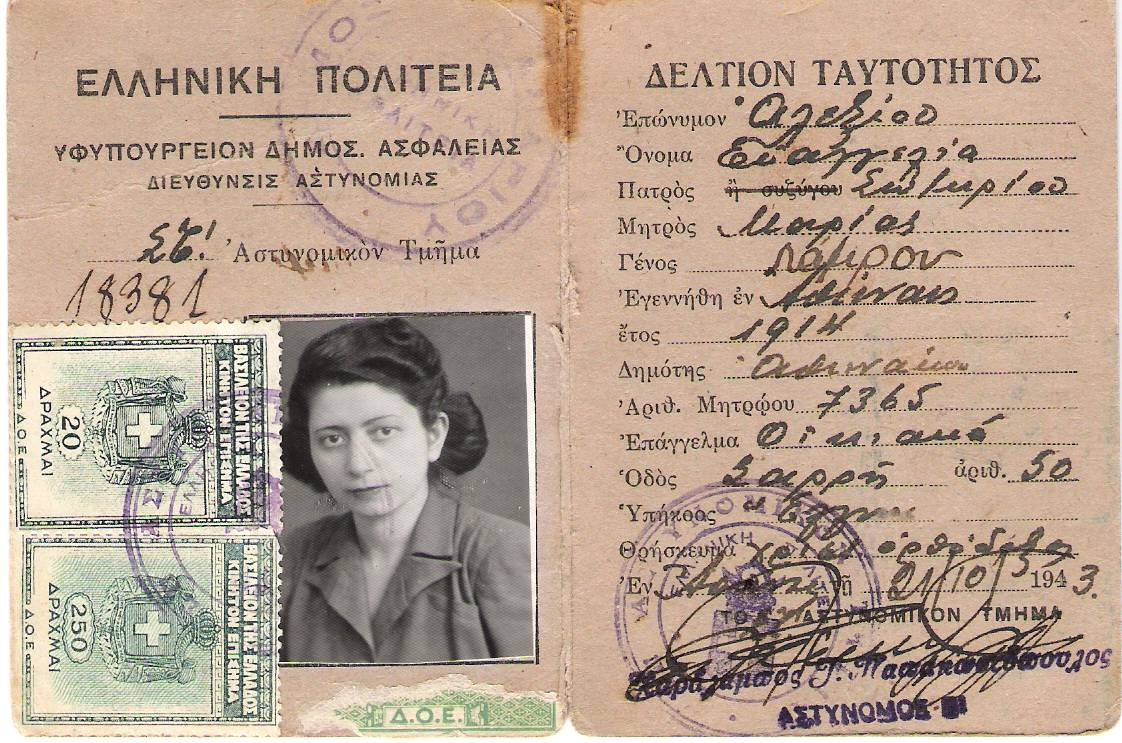
A forged identity card with Christian alias during the Occupation

In Corfu, after the fall of Italian fascism in 1943, the Nazis took control of the island. Corfu's mayor at the time, Kollas, was a known collaborator and various anti-Semitic laws were passed by the Nazis that now formed the occupation government of the island. In early June 1944, while the Allies bombed Corfu as a diversion from the landing in Normandy, the Gestapo rounded up the Jews of the city, temporarily incarcerated them at the old fort (Palaio Frourio) and on the 10th of June sent them to Auschwitz where very few survived. However, approximately two hundred out of a total population of 1,900 managed to flee. Many among the local populace at the time provided shelter and refuge to those 200 Jews that managed to escape the Nazis. As well, a prominent section of the old town is to this day called Evraiki (Εβραική) meaning Jewish suburb in recognition of the Jewish contribution and continued presence in Corfu city. An active Synagogue (Συναγωγή) is an integral part of Evraiki today with about 65 members.

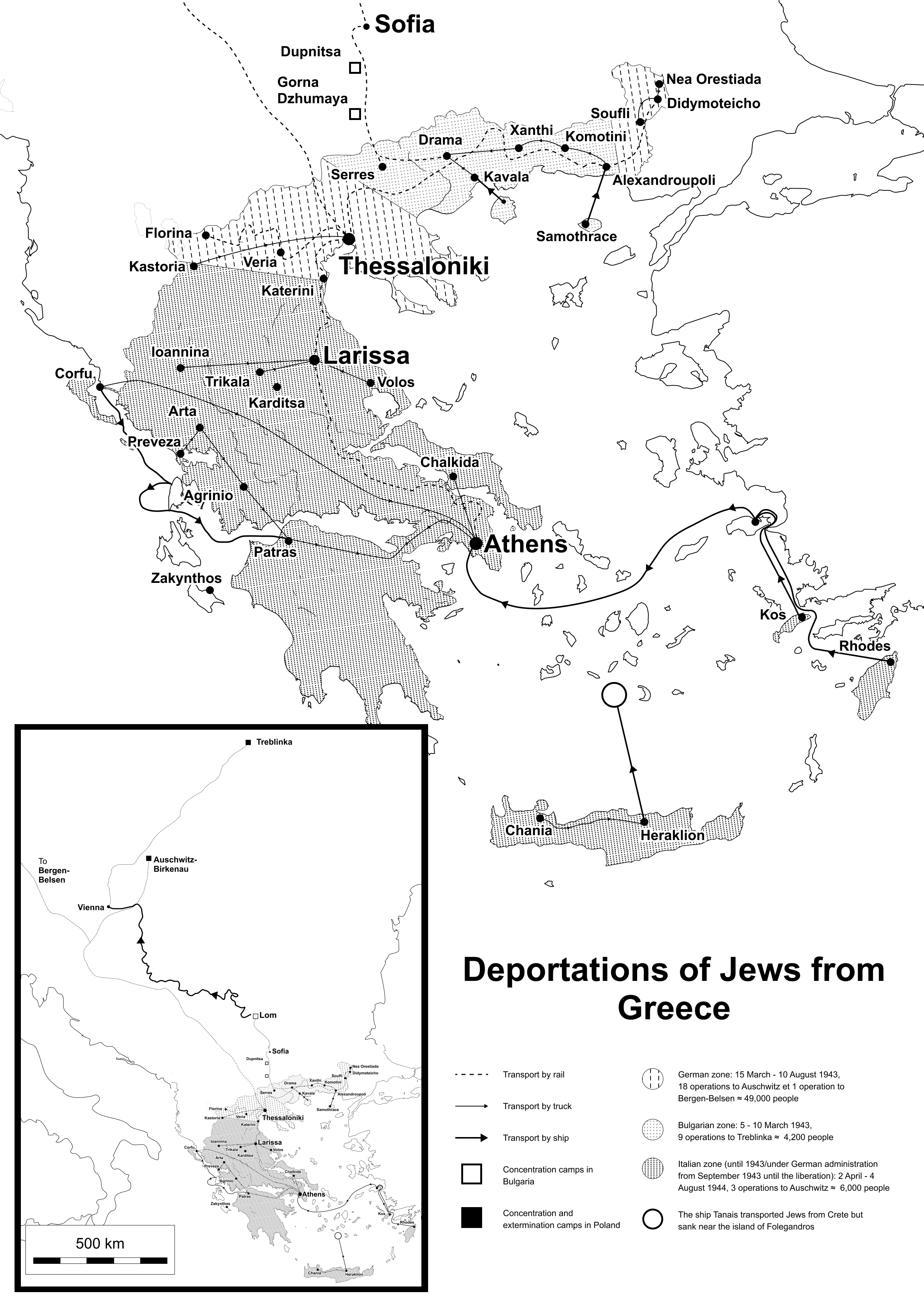
Deportations of Jews from Greece.1943-1944. Anastasios Karababas, In the Footsteps of the Jews of Greece (Prologue by Yiannis Boutaris), Vallentine Mitchell, London/Chicago, 2024, p.15

On March 4, 1943, Bulgarian soldiers with help from German soldiers took the Jews from Komotini and Kavala off the Karageorge passenger boat, massacred them and sank the boat. The Bulgarians confiscated all of the Jewish properties and possessions.

At Thessaloniki individual police officers rescued their Jewish friends and occasionally even their families, while in Athens the chief of police, Angelos Evert, and his men actively supported and rescued Jews.

The 275 Jews of the island of Zakynthos, however, survived the Holocaust. When the island's mayor, Loukas Karrer, was presented with the German order to hand over a list of Jews, Metropolitan Bishop Chrysostomos of Zakynthos returned to the Germans with a list of two names; his own and the mayor's. The island's population hid every member of the Jewish community. In 1947, a large number of the Jews of Zakynthos made aliyah to Palestine (later Israel), while others moved to Athens. When the island was almost levelled by the great earthquake of 1953, the first relief came from Israel, with a message that read "The Jews of Zakynthos have never forgotten their Mayor or their beloved Bishop and what they did for us."

The city of Volos, which was in the Italian zone of occupation, had a Jewish population of 882, and many Thessaloniki Jews fleeing the Nazis sought sanctuary there. By March 1944, more than 1,000 Jews lived there. In September 1943, when the Nazis took over, head rabbi Moses Pesach worked with Archbishop Ioakeim and the EAM resistance movement to find sanctuary for the Jews in Mount Pelion. Due to their efforts, 74% of the city's Jews were saved. Of the more than 1,000 Jews, only 130 were deported to Auschwitz. The Jewish community remained in Volos after the war, but a series of earthquakes in 1955-57 forced many of the remaining Jews to leave, with most immigrating to Israel or the United States. Only 50 to 60 Jews remain in Volos today.

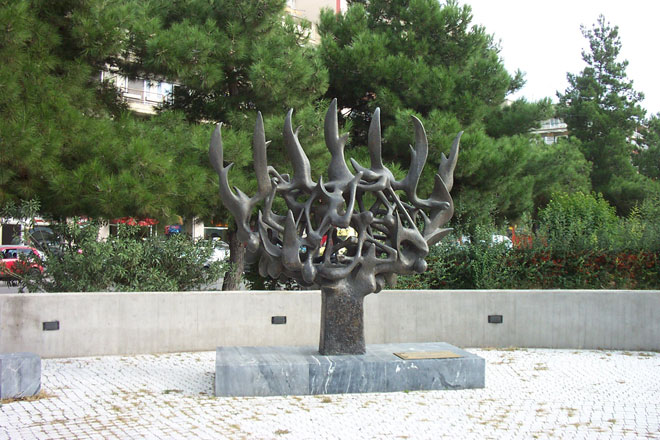
Holocaust memorial, Thessaloniki

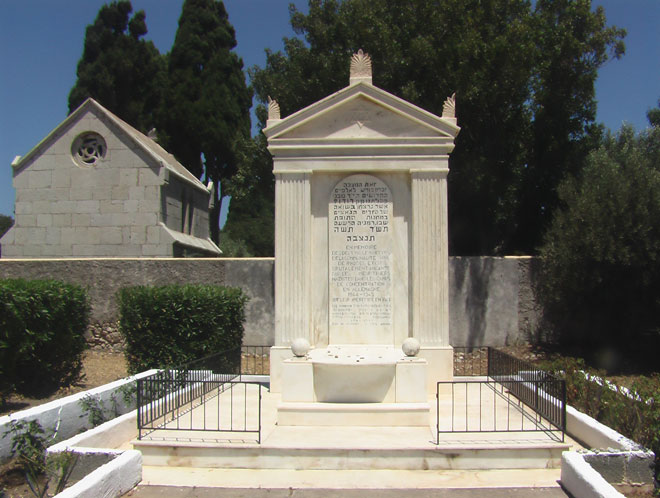
Holocaust memorial at the Jewish cemetery, Rhodes

Many Jews from Salonika were put on death-camp work detail, the Sonderkommandos. On 7 October 1944, during the uprising in Auschwitz, they attacked German forces with other Greek Jews, storming the crematoria and killing about twenty guards. A bomb was thrown into the furnace of the crematorium III, destroying the building. Before being massacred by the Germans, insurgents sang a song of the Greek partisan movement and the Greek national anthem.

In his book If This Is a Man, one of the most famous works of literature of the Holocaust, Primo Levi describes the group thus: "those Greeks, motionless and silent as the Sphinx, crouched on the ground behind their thick pot of soup." Those members of the community still alive during 1944 made a strong impression on the author. He noted: "Despite their low numbers their contribution to the overall appearance of the camp and the international jargon spoken is of prime importance." He described a strong patriotic sense among them, writing that their ability to survive in the camps was partly explained by the fact that "they are among the cohesive of the national groups, and from this point of view the most advanced."

Recognised for his contributions to the Greek cause early on in the war, Mordechai Frizis became one of the most honoured Greek officers of World War II in the postwar years, with a monument outside the national military academy in Athens.

Of the 55,000 Thessaloniki Jews deported to extermination camps in 1943, fewer than 5,000 survived. Many of those who returned found their former homes occupied by Greek families. The Greek government did little to assist the surviving Jewish community with property restoration.

== Post-war community ==
Following the war, many Greek Jews emigrated to Israel. In August 1949, the Greek government announced that Jews of military age would be allowed to leave for Israel on condition that they renounced their Greek nationality, promise to never return, and take their families with them. The Greek Jews that moved to Israel established several villages, including Tsur Moshe, and many settled in the Florentine, Tel Aviv and the area around Jaffa Harbor. Some also emigrated to the United States, Canada, and Australia. Greece was the first country in Europe after the war to give back to its Jewish community possessions of Jews, that were killed by the Nazis in the Holocaust and the war as resistance fighters, so that the communities had the possibility for consolidation.

A Jewish minority continues to live in Greece. There are communities in Athens and Thessaloniki. The community has had a small decrease since the Greek government-debt crisis. As of 2020, about 5,000 Jews live in Greece, mostly in Athens (2500), with less than 1,000 in Thessaloniki. The Greek Jewish community has traditionally been pro-European. Today the Jews of Greece are integrated and are working in all fields of the Greek state and the Greek society, such in the fields of economy, science and politics.

The community of Thessaloniki demanded Germany pay the manumission payments back that the Jews of Greece paid to rescue their family members after the Nazis asked for this money but the Nazis hadn't freed the family members anyway. The European Court of Justice dismissed this petition.

In World War II the Deutsche Reichsbahn helped the Nazis to deport the Jews from Greece. In 2014, representatives of the Jewish community of Thessaloniki demanded from the Deutsche Bahn, which is the successor of the Deutsche Reichsbahn, reimbursement for the heirs of Holocaust victims of Thessaloniki for the train fares that they were forced to pay for their deportation from Thessaloniki to Auschwitz and Treblinka between March and August 1943.

According to the significant Jewish past and present of Thessaloniki the Aristotle University planned together with the Jewish community of Thessaloniki in 2014, the reopening of the Faculty of Jewish Studies. A former Jewish faculty was abolished 80 years before by the Greek dictator Ioannis Metaxas. This new faculty took in October 2015, her work on with leading professor Georgios Antoniou in the faculty of Philosophy. On the university campus a monument commemorating the old Jewish cemetery was unveiled also in 2014. The campus was built partially on this old cemetery.

Today, the current Chief Rabbi of Greece is Rabbi Gabriel Negrin.

=== Antisemitism in Greece ===
Misha Glenny wrote that Greek Jews had never "encountered anything remotely as sinister as north European anti-Semitism. The twentieth century had witnessed small amounts of anti-Jewish sentiment among Greeks... but it attracted an insignificant minority." The danger of deportation to death camps was repeatedly met with disbelief by Greece's Jewish population.

A neo-fascist group, Golden Dawn, exists in Greece and in September 2015 Greek election won 18 seats in the Greek Parliament. Reportedly in 2005, it was officially disbanded, to no avail, by its leadership after conflicts with police and anti-fascists. The European Union Monitoring Centre on Racism and Xenophobia 2002–2003 report on anti-Semitism in Greece mentioned several incidents over the two-year period making note that there were no instances of physical or verbal assaults on Jews, along with examples of "good practices" for countering prejudice. The report concluded that "...in 2003 the Chairman of the Central Jewish Board in Greece stated that he did not consider the rise in antisemitism to be alarming."

On 21 November 2003, Nikos Bistis, the Greek Deputy Minister of the Interior, declared January 27 to be Holocaust Remembrance Day in Greece, and committed to a "coalition of Greek Jews, Greek non-Jews, and Jews worldwide to fight antisemitism in Greece."

The Greek government debt crisis, which started in 2009, has seen an increase in extremism of all kinds, which has included some cases of antisemitic vandalism. In 2010, the front of the Jewish Museum of Greece was defaced, for the first time ever. On Rhodes, on 26 October 2012, vandals spray-painted the city's Holocaust monument with swastikas. Partly to head off any new-found threat from extremism, thousands of Jewish and non-Jewish Greeks attended Thessaloniki's Holocaust Commemoration in March 2013. The meeting was personally addressed by Greece's prime minister, Antonis Samaras, who delivered a speech to Monastir Synagogue in Thessaloniki.

After a period, Alexandros Modiano, a Greek-Jewish politician, has been voted to official duties. Alexandros Modiano works in the City Council of Athens.

Today the relations between the Jewish community and the state of Greece are good.

In recent years, EU funding enabled the Jewish Community of Thessaloniki to develop the “IOSIPOS” (“Josephus”) project, a digital archive open to the public, containing historical materials on Jewish communities in different cities in Greece. The archive includes over 200,000 records and about two million digitised items, such as photographs, documents, drawings, and oral testimonies. The goals of the project are to preserve Greek Jews history and tradition.

== Obtaining Greek citizenship for Jews outside Greece ==
The Greek Parliament has decided to give Greek citizenship back to all Holocaust survivors who lost their Greek citizenship when leaving the country. Those who are born outside Greece to either one or both Greek parents, or one or more Greek grandparents, are entitled to stake a claim to their right to a Greek citizenship through their ancestor(s) born in Greece. For the process of obtaining one's Greek citizenship, there is no need to prove the religious denomination of the ancestors.

== Jewish religious life ==
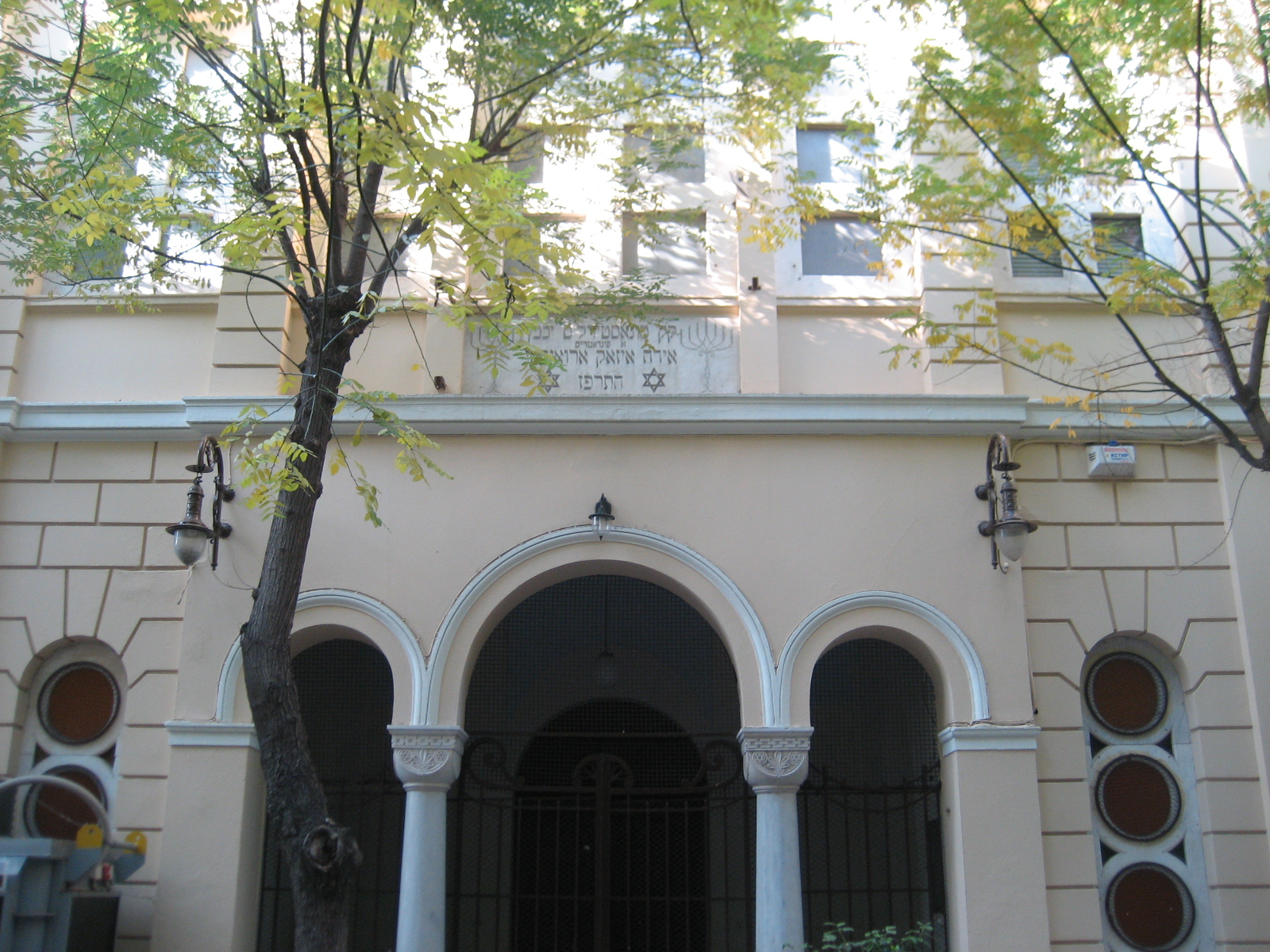
Monastir Synagogue (Thessaloniki)

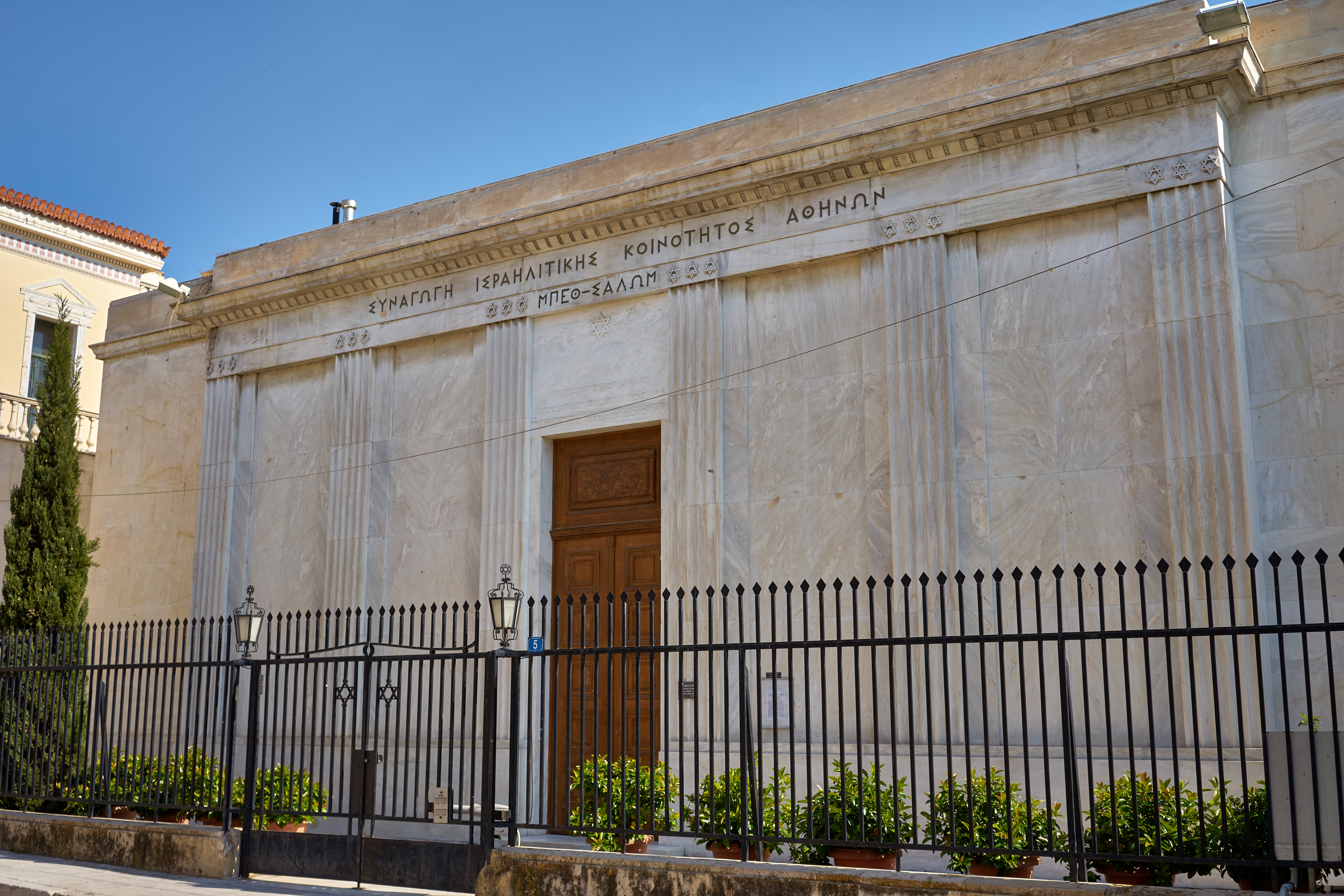
Beth Shalom Synagogue, Athens

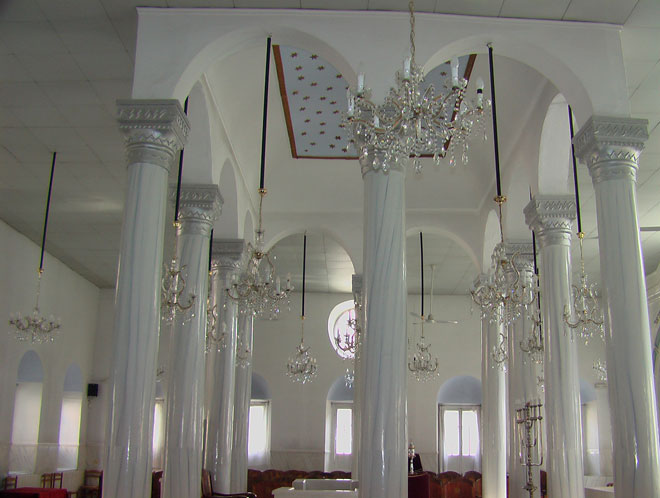
Larissa

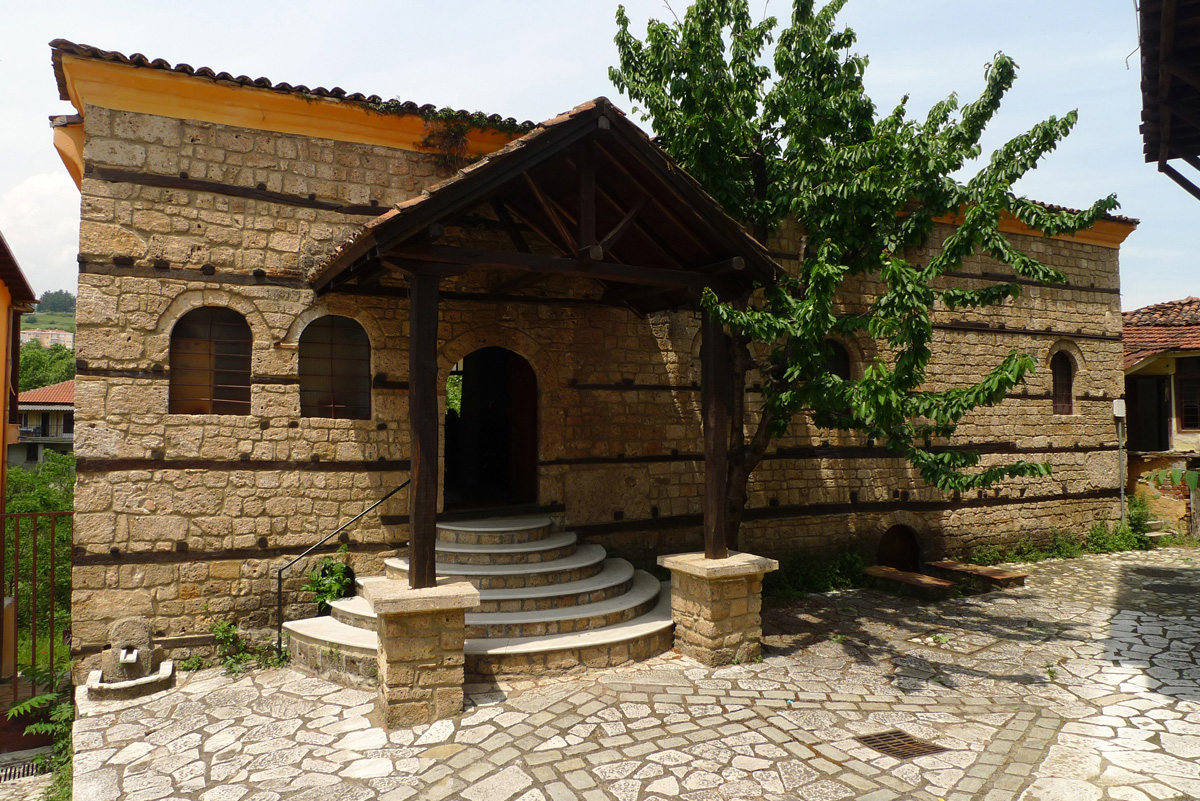
Veria

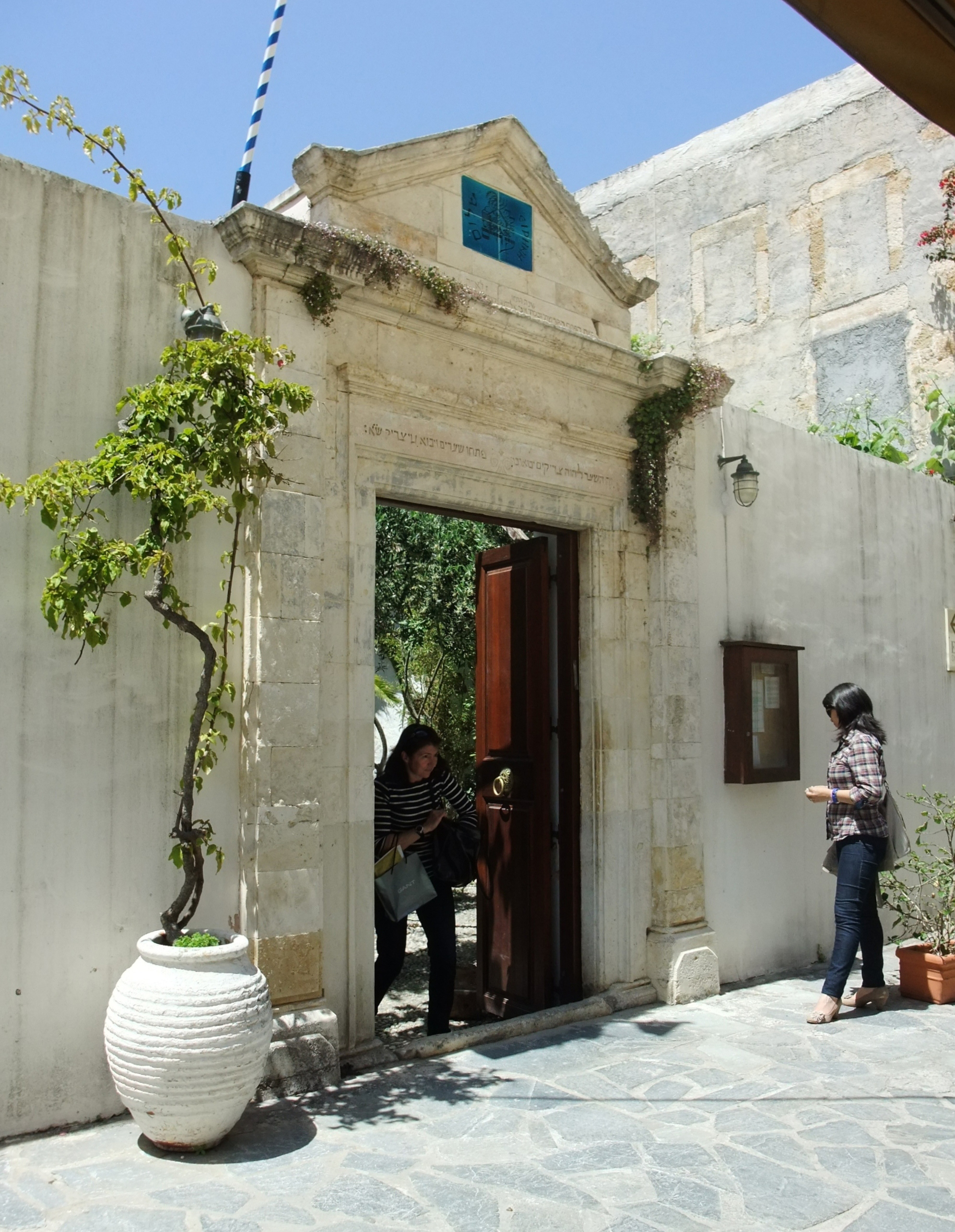
Etz Hayyim Synagogue, Chania

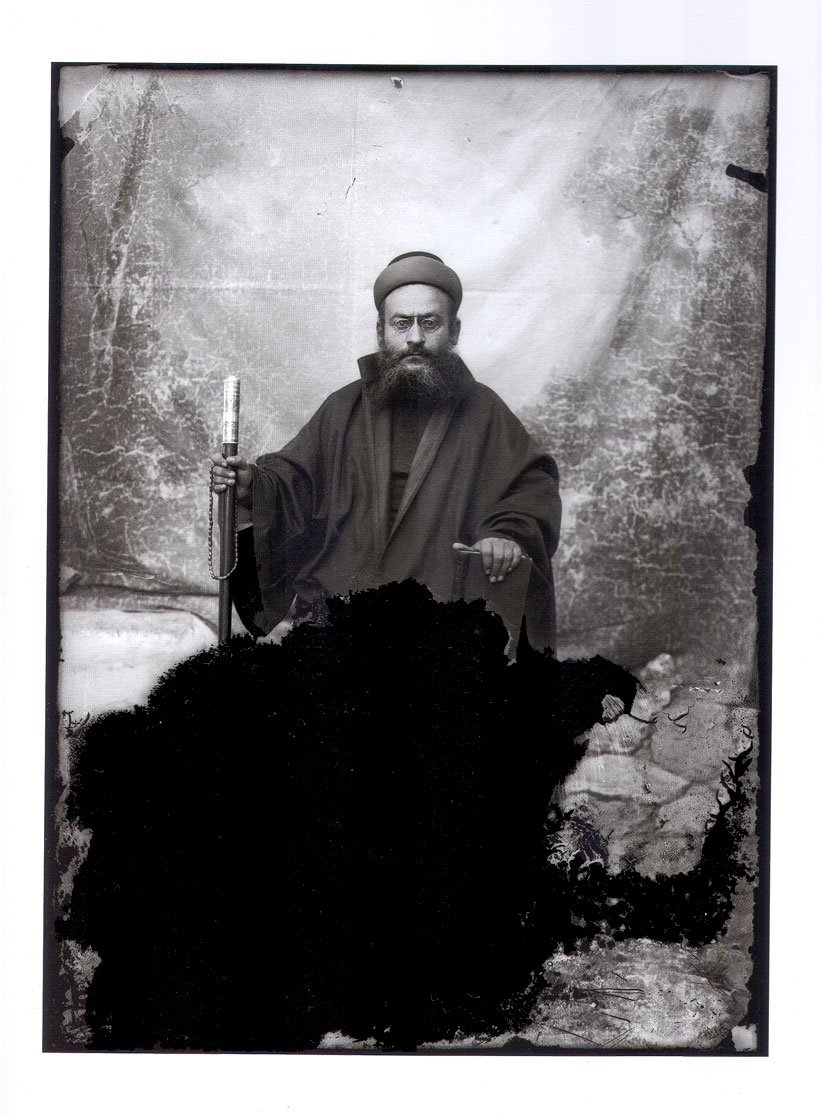
The rabbi of Kastoria, 1904 (photo Leonidas Papazoglou)

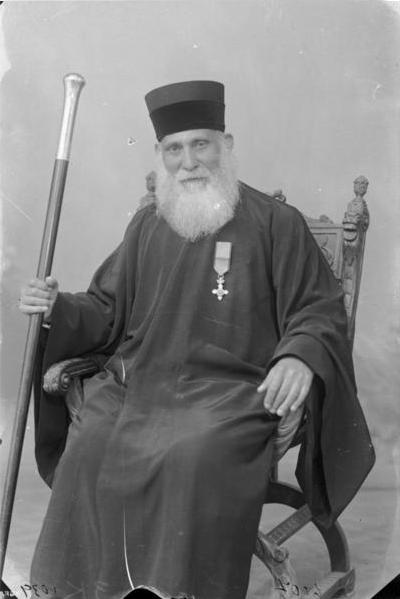
Rabbi Moshe Pesach

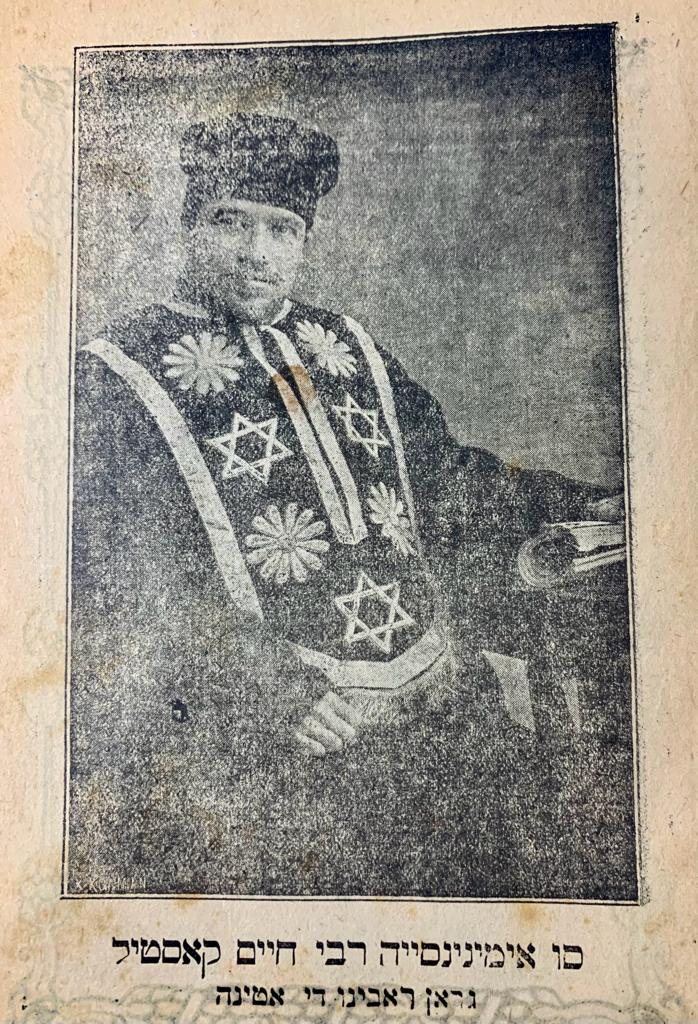
The Chief Rabbi of Athens from 1913 to 1924 Haïm Castel

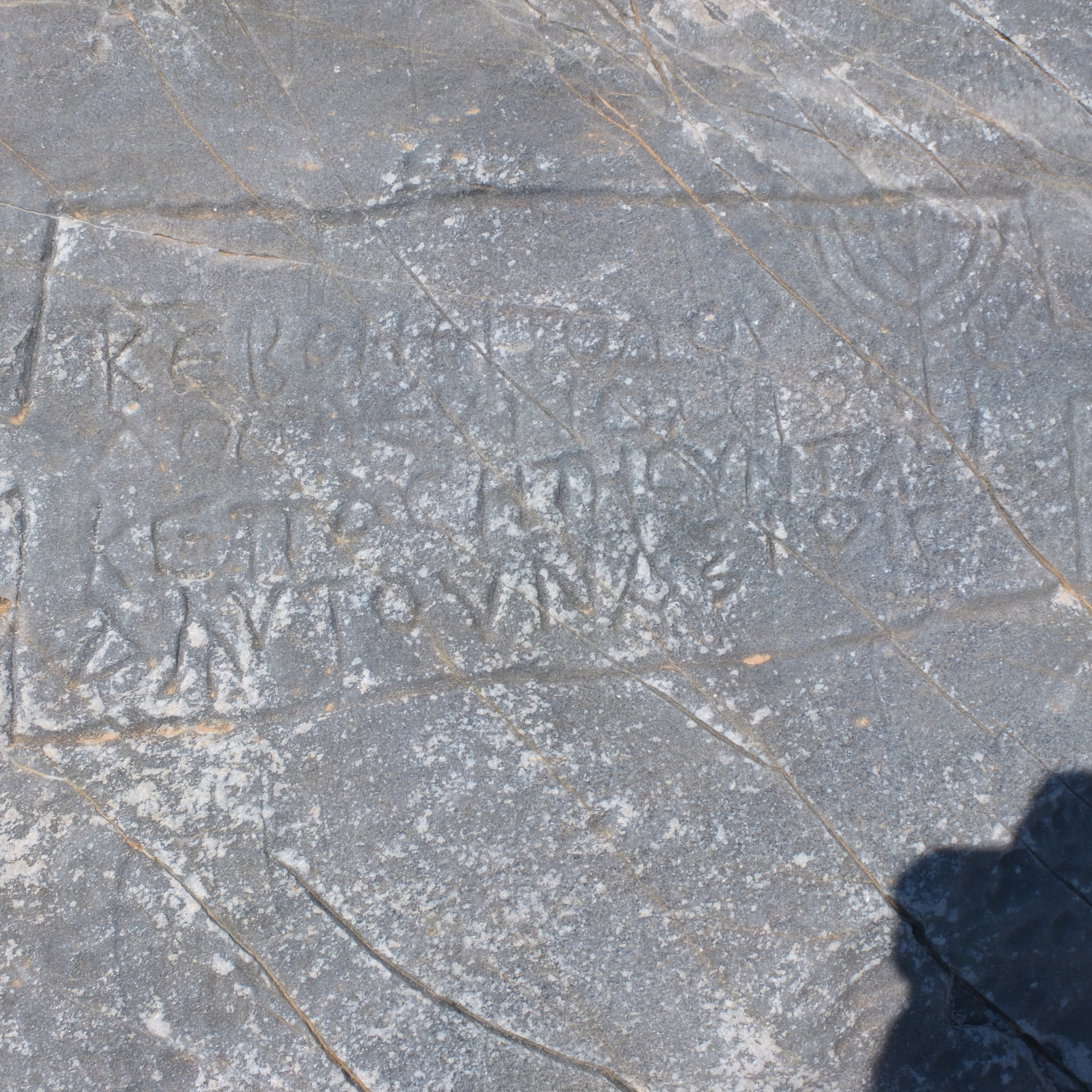
An inscription on a rock by the sea of a possibly Jewish traveller at Syros, Greece

== See also ==
- Holocaust Museum of Greece
- History of the Jews of Thessaloniki
- History of the Jews in Cyprus
- Jewish Museum of Greece
- Greek Citron
- Greece–Israel relations

== Sources ==
- Blümel, Tobias (2017). "Antisemitism as political theology in Greece and its impact on Greek Jewry, 1967–1979". Southeast European and Black Sea Studies. 17 (2): 181–202. doi:10.1080/14683857.2017.1324263. S2CID 148887813.
- Giorgios Antoniou, A. Dirk Moses: The Holocaust in Greece. Cambridge University 2018, ISBN 978-1-108-47467-2.
- Glenny, Misha (1999). The Balkans: nationalism, war and the great powers 1804-1999, New York: Viking Penguin. ISBN 0-14-023377-6.
- Fleming, KE (2008). Greece: A Jewish History. Princeton University Press.
- Karababas, Anastasios (2024-01-30). In the Footsteps of the Jews of Greece: From Ancient Times to the Present Day. Vallentine Mitchell Publishers. ISBN 978-1-80371-043-3.
- Mazower, Mark (2004). Salonica, City of Ghosts: Christians, Muslims and Jews, 1430-1950. HarperCollins.
- Naar, Devin E. Jewish Salonica: Between the Ottoman Empire and Modern Greece. Stanford Studies in Jewish History and Culture Series. Stanford Stanford University Press, 2016. 400 pp. ISBN 978-1-5036-0008-9.
- Manifestations of Antisemitism in the EU, 2002-2003 Part on Greece, European Monitoring Centre on Racism and Xenophobia (EUMC). URL accessed April 15, 2006. [PDF]
- Jewish Community of Thessaloniki. Foundation for the Advancement of Sephardic Studies and Culture. URL accessed April 15, 2006.
- The Holocaust in Greece at the United States Holocaust Memorial Museum
- Andrew Apostolou, "Mother of Israel, Orphan of History: Writing on Jewish Salonika", Israel Affairs 13:1:193-204 doi:10.1080/13537120601063499. A review of recent work on the Jewish community of Thessaloniki.
- Annette B. Fromm, Folklore and Ethnic Identity of the Jewish Community of Ioannina, Greece, Lexington Books, 2008, ISBN 978-0-7391-2061-3
- Doxiadis, Evdoxios (2018). State, Nationalism, and the Jewish Communities of Modern Greece. Bloomsbury Publishing. ISBN 978-1-4742-6348-1.
