= Etz Chaim Center for Jewish Learning =

Orthodox Jewish organization

Etz Chaim Center, Inc.
- Founded: November 30, 1983; 42 years ago
- Tax ID no.: 52-1369910
- Legal status: 501(c)(3) religious organization
- Location(s): Baltimore and Owings Mills, Maryland, United States
- Region served: Baltimore metropolitan area, Washington metropolitan area, Philadelphia metropolitan area
- Dean and President, The Etz Chaim Center: Rabbi Shlomo Porter
- Director: Rabbi Zev Pomeranz
- Website: www.etzchaimusa.org

Etz Chaim Center for Jewish Learning is an Orthodox Jewish organization designed to reach out to secular and non-Orthodox Jews in the hopes of bringing them into the Baal teshuva movement. Its national headquarters are located in Baltimore, Maryland with other locations in Owings Mills, Maryland, Philadelphia, and Washington, D.C. It was under the direction of Rabbi Shlomo Porter until his death in November, 2025. Rabbi Porter had led the organization since 1981. Originally from Milwaukee, Wisconsin, Rabbi Porter graduated from Ner Israel Rabbinical College.

== History ==
Officially incorporated on November 30, 1983, Etz Chaim is a multi-faceted outreach center dedicated to reaching Jews of all backgrounds to experience Orthodox Judaism. Among its programs, Etz Chaim helps people find study partners for the process of conversion to Orthodox Judaism. Etz Chaim says that success is when a person considers their Jewish identity more valuable, when a person chooses not to intermarry, or when a person does one mitzvah.

In 1992, a Lubavitch family advertised and held Jewish services, ceremonies, and celebrations in their house in Baltimore County. Neighbors complained to the local zoning commission, stating that the family were using their home as a synagogue, in direct violation of local zoning laws, parking laws, and noise restrictions. Etz Chaim supported the family, stating that enforcing such laws on a place of worship was unconstitutional.

In 1992, Etz Chaim supported detailed recommendations regarding Jewish celebrations that restricted kiddush to only one hot dish, cake, and drinks, while a b'nai mitzvah or wedding celebration may have up to two hot dishes. The recommendations stated that all religious celebrations be held only at a synagogue itself or a synagogue's facilities.

In 1993, Etz Chaim honored Marc Hurwitz for his working helping college students discover or maintain their Jewish identities and fighting assimilation on college campuses.

In 1998, Etz Chaim moved its headquarters from Northeast Baltimore to Center City Baltimore.

In 2001, a bill was proposed to prohibiting discrimination based on sexual orientation with regard to public accommodations, housing, and employment in Maryland. Etz Chaim opposed the bill, stating that Orthodox Judaism opposes homosexuality. Also in 2001, a choir of 61 mixed-gender students in third through fifth grades prepared to sing at a Jewish food and life expo. When Etz Chaim was asked whether it was religiously appropriate for female and male children to sing together, Etz Chaim determined the performance should not go forward.

On February 6, 2002, a fire destroyed the Etz Chaim Center for Jewish Studies. A teenager was arrested and charged with arson. With money from its insurance carrier and several donors, Etz Chaim was able to rebuild. The new, larger facility included a Shabbaton center, coffee shop, and library, and it was dedicated in June 2015.

== See also ==
- Baal teshuva
- Jewish fundamentalism
- Orthodox Judaism outreach
- Outreach Judaism
