= Beth Shalom Synagogue (Athens) =

Orthodox synagogue in Athens, Greece

- Hebrew: בית כנסת בית שלום
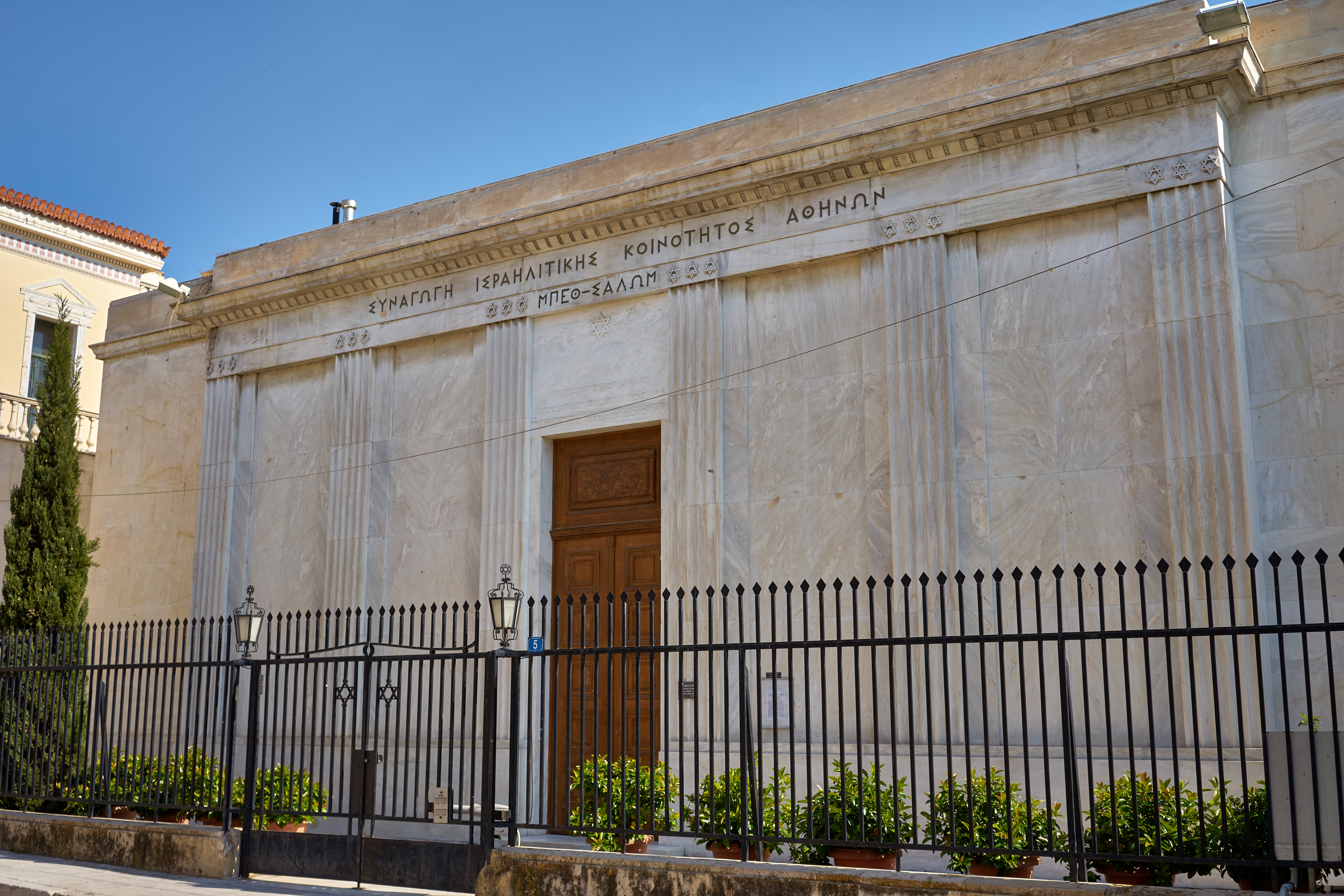
- The synagogue entrance, in 2020

- Location of the synagogue in central Athens

Religion
- Affiliation: Orthodox Judaism
- Rite: Sephardi
- Ecclesiastical or organizational status: Synagogue
- Leadership: Rabbi Gabriel Negrin
- Status: Active

Location
- Location: 5 Melidoni Street, Athens 105 53
- Country: Greece
- Interactive map of Beth Shalom Synagogue
- Coordinates: 37°58′42″N 23°43′13″E

Architecture
- Architect: Emmanuel Lazaridis
- Type: Synagogue architecture
- Style: Greek Revival
- Completed: 1935
- Materials: Pentelic marble

The Beth Shalom Synagogue (Hebrew: בית כנסת בית שלום) is an Orthodox Jewish congregation and synagogue, located at 5 Melidoni Street, in Athens, Greece. The synagogue serves as the principal place of Jewish worship in Athens.

Built of white Pentelic marble, the synagogue was designed by Emmanuel Lazaridis in an austere Greek Revival style. Completed in 1935, the building was renovated in 1975.

The congregation worships in the Eastern Sephardi rite, and is led by Rabbi Gabriel Negrin, who was elected by the Council of Athens’ Jewish Community following the 2014 death of the long time leader, Rabbi Jacob Arar.

== See also ==
- Judaism in Greece
- History of the Jews in Greece
