= Etz Hayyim Synagogue =

Orthodox synagogue in Crete, Greece

- Hebrew: בית הכנסת עץ חיים
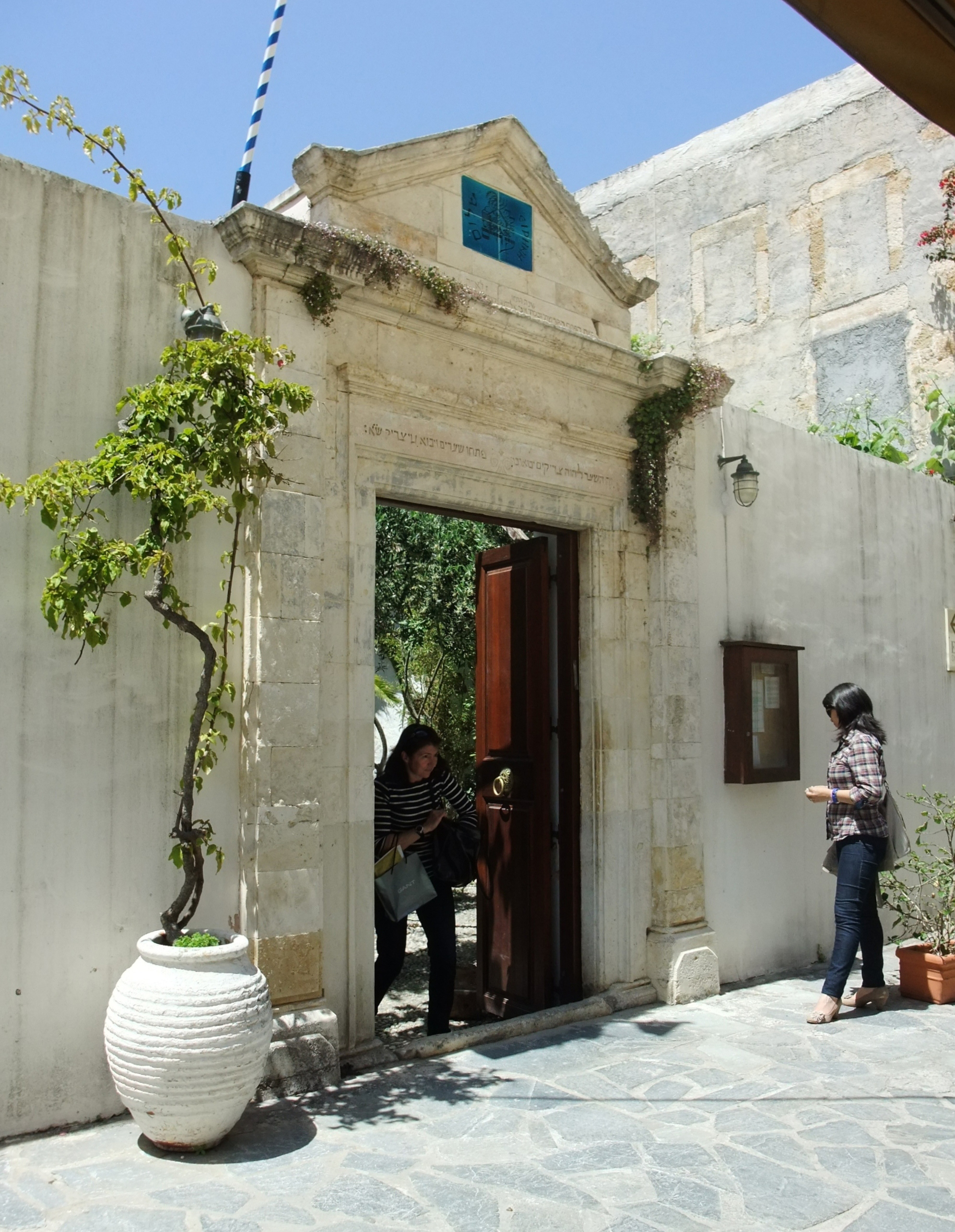
- The synagogue in 2012

- Location of the synagogue on Crete

Religion
- Affiliation: Orthodox Judaism
- Rite: Romaniote and Sephardi
- Ecclesiastical or organisational status: Synagogue (17th century–1944); Synagogue (since 1999)
- Status: Active

Location
- Location: Parodos Kondylaki 24, Chania, Crete
- Country: Greece
- Coordinates: 35°30′56″N 24°01′00″E

Architecture
- Type: Church
- Established: 17th century (original); 1999 (reconstruction)
- Materials: Stone

Website
- etz-hayyim-hania.org

The Etz Hayyim Synagogue (Hebrew: בית הכנסת עץ חיים) is an Orthodox Jewish congregation and synagogue, located in Chania on the island of Crete, in Greece. Constructed as a church, the building was converted into a synagogue in the 17th century. It is the only surviving remnant of the island's Romaniote Jewish community.

== Overview ==
The synagogue fell into disuse and ruin after the deportation and drowning of the Jewish community of Chania in July 1944.

After being restored during the late 1990s, the synagogue (with its mikveh) became a tourist destination and attracted visits from foreign dignitaries including the Queen Sofía of Spain and King Constantine II of Greece, both of whom made an unannounced visit to the site in March 2006.

The synagogue is seen locally as a symbol of coexistence. Uniquely, almost all of its congregants are non-Jews, with an international team taking care of the congregation work. Occasionally, a rabbi or (during the Jewish holidays) someone who is able to blow the shofar visits the community. Christians and Muslims are welcome to visit. Despite the community's Romaniote past, the congregation today uses primarily the Sephardic custom of Greece and has developed its own Haggadah text.

=== Arson attacks ===
The synagogue was the target of multiple arson attacks in January 2010; fires were set inside the synagogue on 5 and 16 January, and a bar of soap was left outside during the latter, presumably invoking a common Greek-language antisemitic threat which translates to "I'll make you into a bar of soap". The first fire was quickly contained, but the second destroyed 2,500 rare books and manuscripts. Two British men aged 23 and 33, and one Greek man aged 24, were arrested in connection with both attacks after the Greek man confessed to police. Two Americans were also being sought by police in connection with the first attack.

== See also ==
- Judaism in Greece
- History of the Jews in Greece
