= Ahoy =

Traditional maritime greeting

Ahoy (/əˈhɔɪ/) is a signal word used to call to a ship or boat. It is derived from the Middle English cry, 'Hoy!'. The word fell out of use at one time, but was revived when sailing became a popular sport. 'Ahoy' can also be used as a greeting, a warning, or a farewell.

One or another variation on the word is found in several languages. In Czech and Slovak, ahoj is a common, colloquial greeting, while 'hoi' in Modern Dutch and Swiss German, ‘oi’ in Brazilian Portuguese and Italian, and 'Ohøj' in Danish are informal greetings equivalent to the English 'hi' or 'hey'.

‘Ahoy’ originated in the seafaring world, where it was used as an interjection to catch the attention of crew members and as a general greeting. It is often used today by participants in playful imitations of pirate speak.

Alexander Graham Bell initially suggested that the standard greeting when answering a telephone should be 'ahoy', but instead 'hello' (suggested by Thomas Edison) was adopted.

== Early forms and development ==
=== "a, hoy, hoay" ===
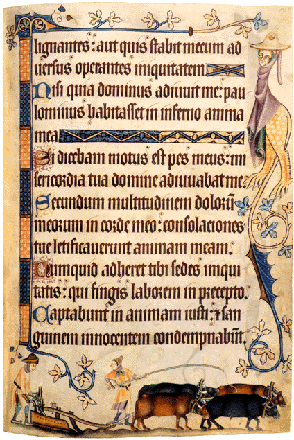
Piers the Plowman, driving oxen, in a Psalter from the 14th century

Ahoy is a combination of the call 'hoy' plus the sound 'a', presumably added to draw more attention to the cry. 'Hoy!' was a common call in England to drive cattle. The earliest known example is from William Langland, in whose 1393 epic poem, Piers the Ploughman, the word first appears in Middle English: 'And holpen to erie þis half acre with 'hoy! troly! lolly!', which roughly translates to "And helped to plow this half acre with 'hoy! troly! lolly!'".

Seamen used the word "hoy" in the form of "hoay". The Scottish poet William Falconer, author of a nautical dictionary, wrote 1769: "If the master intends to give any order to the people in the main-top, he calls, Main-top, hoay! To which they answer, Holloa!", Two other dictionaries from 1805 list Falconers call as "hoay" and answer "holloa". "Ahoy" does not appear.

Functionally related with "hoy" is a group of similar sounding calls and greetings in the Germanic languages: Middle and Modern English "hey" and "hi", German, Dutch, Danish and Norwegian hei, in Sweden hej, and the Dutch greeting hoi.

In Old Russian "goy" was a standard greeting which is still present in Russian folk fairy tales.

In Czech and Slovak, 'Ahoj' (pronounced [ˈaɦoj]) is a commonly used as an informal greeting, comparable to "Hello". It was borrowed from English and became popular among people engaged in water sports. It gained wide currency by the 1930s.

=== ahiu, â hui ===
Two discoveries in Middle High German literature reveal interjections similar to ahoi. Their forms show no links to the middle English form hoy and their meanings offer little connection to the call used to establish contact.

In around 1290 Heinrich von Freiberg used the form ahiu twice in his adaptation of Tristan as a greeting: "ahiu, Parmenois Tristan!", alongside "ahiu, wie schône sie het sich ûz gefêgetieret", English: "ahiu, how prettily she has dressed!". Ahiu has the same meaning as the interjections ahiv, ahiw and hiu, which occur in this text as well. As part of a group of words consisting of ahî, ay and ahei, which express pain, desire and admiration, ahiu can be found before exclamative or optative sentences and in emphatic greetings.

Between 1331 and 1341, in his work Kronike von Pruzinlant, Nikolaus von Jeroschin inserted the expression "â hui! sô wêr ich hôchgemût / sô ich ir stirne sêhe blôz". Ahui, together with aheia, ahi and ahu, belongs to a group of words that express incommensurable joy, esteem and similar positive attitudes.

== Distribution and use ==
=== General information ===
Seamen had been using ahoy long before the first recorded use in print in well-known seafaring songs or shanties. There is a lack of research into handwritten letters and records from seamen. Therefore, printed works concerning the use of the "Ahoy"-word family have only restricted significance regarding the temporal and geographical distribution.

"Ahoy" represents the original English form and its first maritime use was recorded in 1751 as a new word in nautical language. The first evidence for the German word "ahoi" is found in 1828. Ahoy is widely used in the Northern and Baltic Maritime World. It expresses semantically a change in distance or presupposes it. In most languages it can be used as an interjection, whilst in others it takes the form of a verb (e. g. English - "to ahoy", German - "ahoi sagen") or a noun (e. g. Swedish - "ohoj", German - "das Ahoi") It is not known how the word spread in harbour towns or on ships with an international crew, especially as similar sounding interjections in a neighbouring language may have either interfered with or promoted the adoption.

In spoken German, either the command or the addressee can come first, e.g. "'Pfeil, ahoi!" or"Ahoi, Pfeil"!" although in written German there is no comma between the two words. In other languages this is variable.

=== English ===
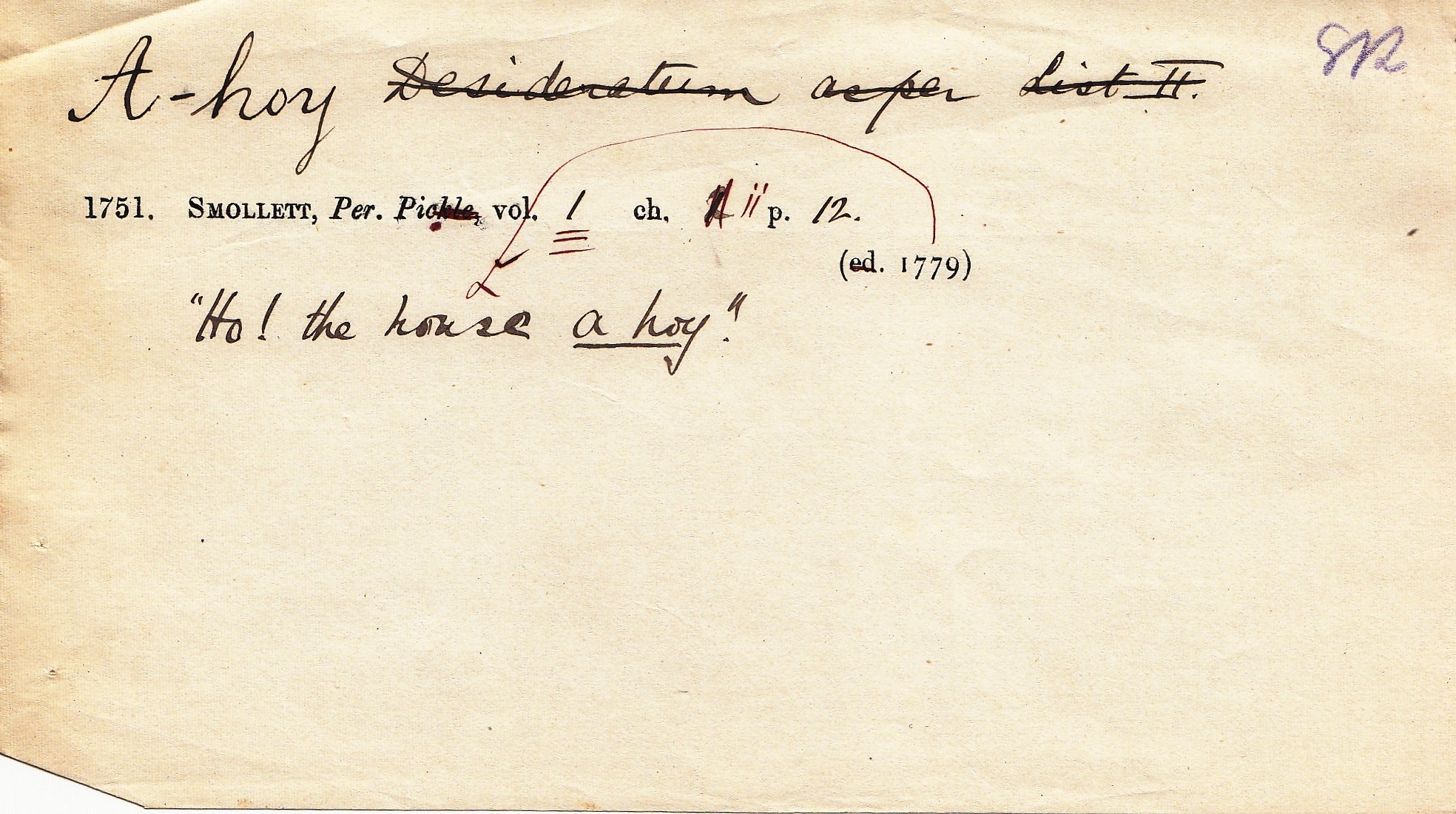
Oxford English Dictionary clipping for a 1751 use of "a hoy!"

==== First examples ====
The exclamation "Ho, the ship, a hoy!", pronounced by a seaman in Tobias Smollett's The Adventures of Roderick Random (1748), is the first known written example of the expression ahoy in the English language. One early example of the expression can be found in William Falconer's Dictionary of the Marine (1780): "The usual expression is, Hoa, the ship ahoay!". In the first edition of this dictionary (1769) the expression was still in its previous form hoay.

In the 1780s ahoy was already used on the stage in London to create a sea-faring atmosphere. In this way it reached a very wide audience. In the comedy The Walloons, brought to the stage in 1782 by the playwright Richard Cumberland, the expression was used to catch someone's attention: "Ahoy! you Bumboat, bring yourself this way". The work was published posthumously in 1813.

In another early documented source, as well, ahoy was similarly used to catch someone's attention. The expression ahoy was heard in 1789 in the lyrics of a sea shanty, a worksong sung by able seamen, when the English composer Charles Dibdin (1745-1814) performed his musical The Oddities in London. This work also contains the song Ben Backstay, about a boatswain. The song goes: "And none as he so merrily / Could pipe all hands ahoy". The lyrics were not published until 1826.

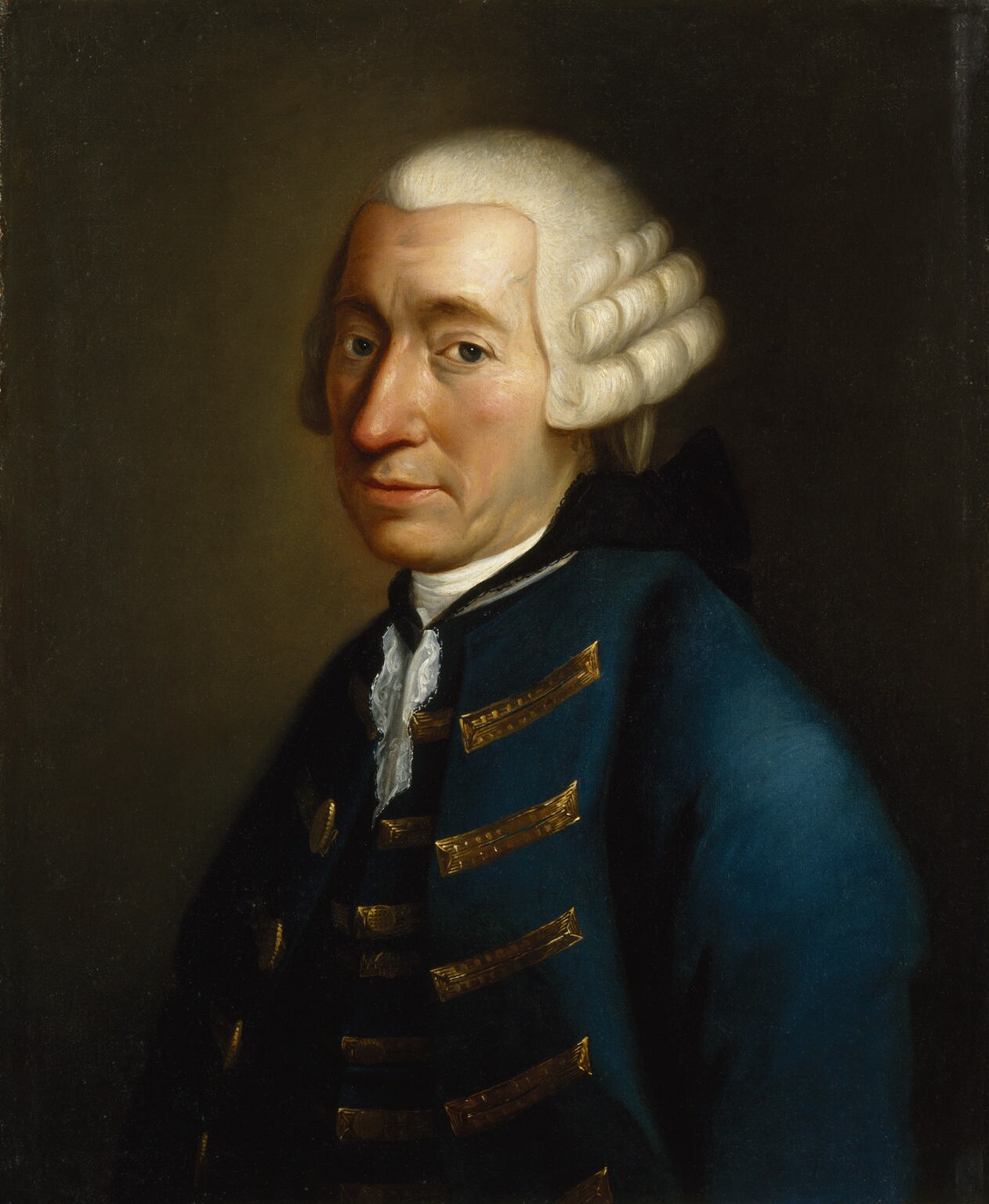
Tobias Smollett used the expression a hoy for the first time, so far as is known, in 1748

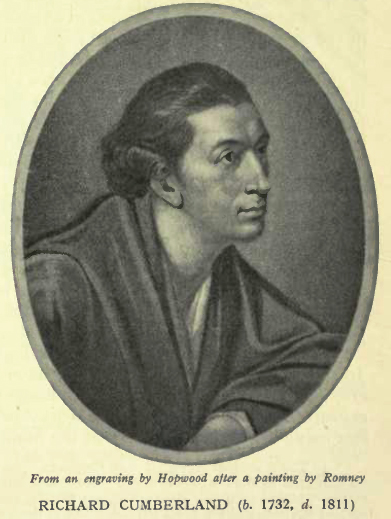
Richard Cumberland used the present form ahoy in 1782

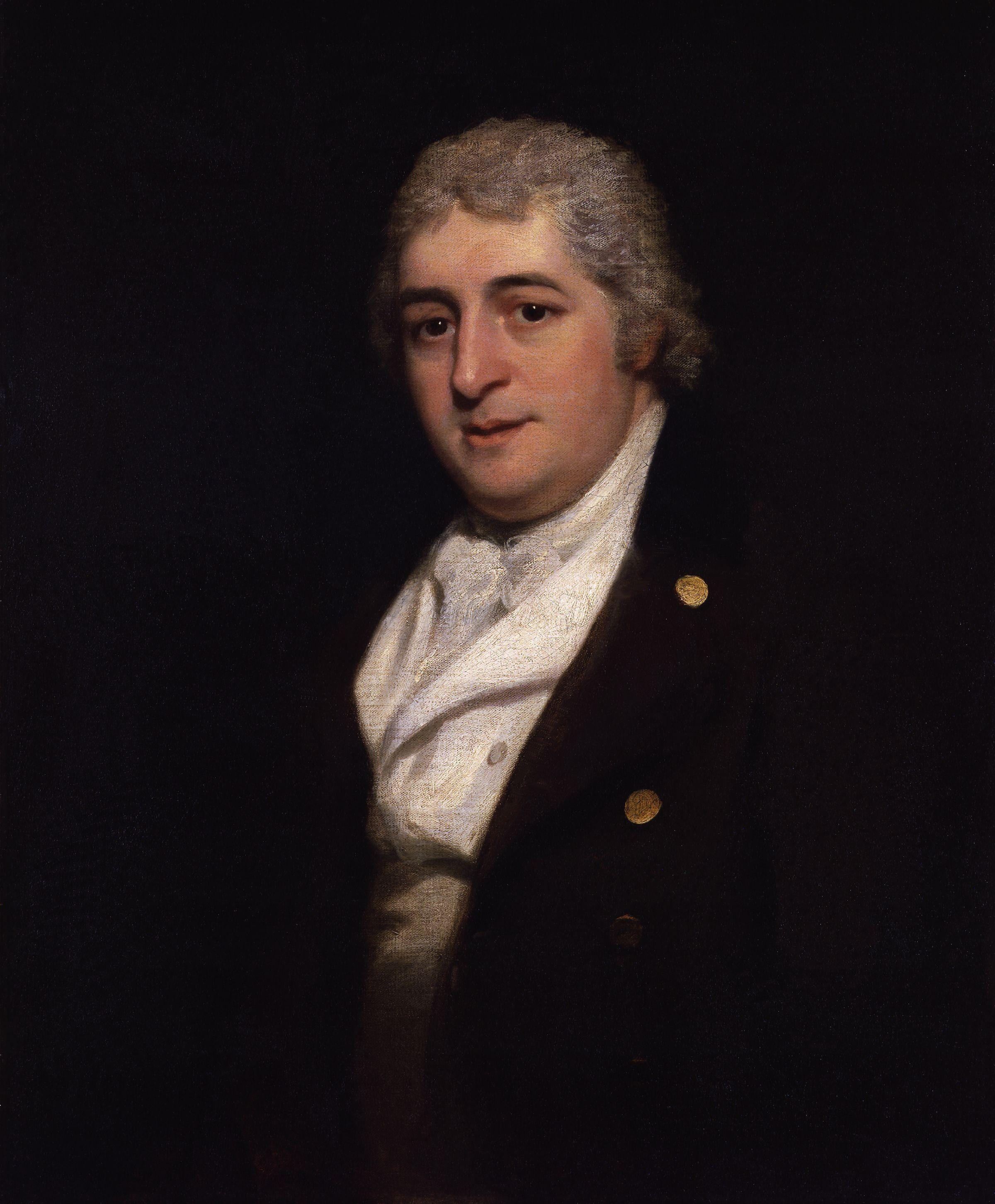
Charles Dibdin inserted ahoy in a song of one of his musicals

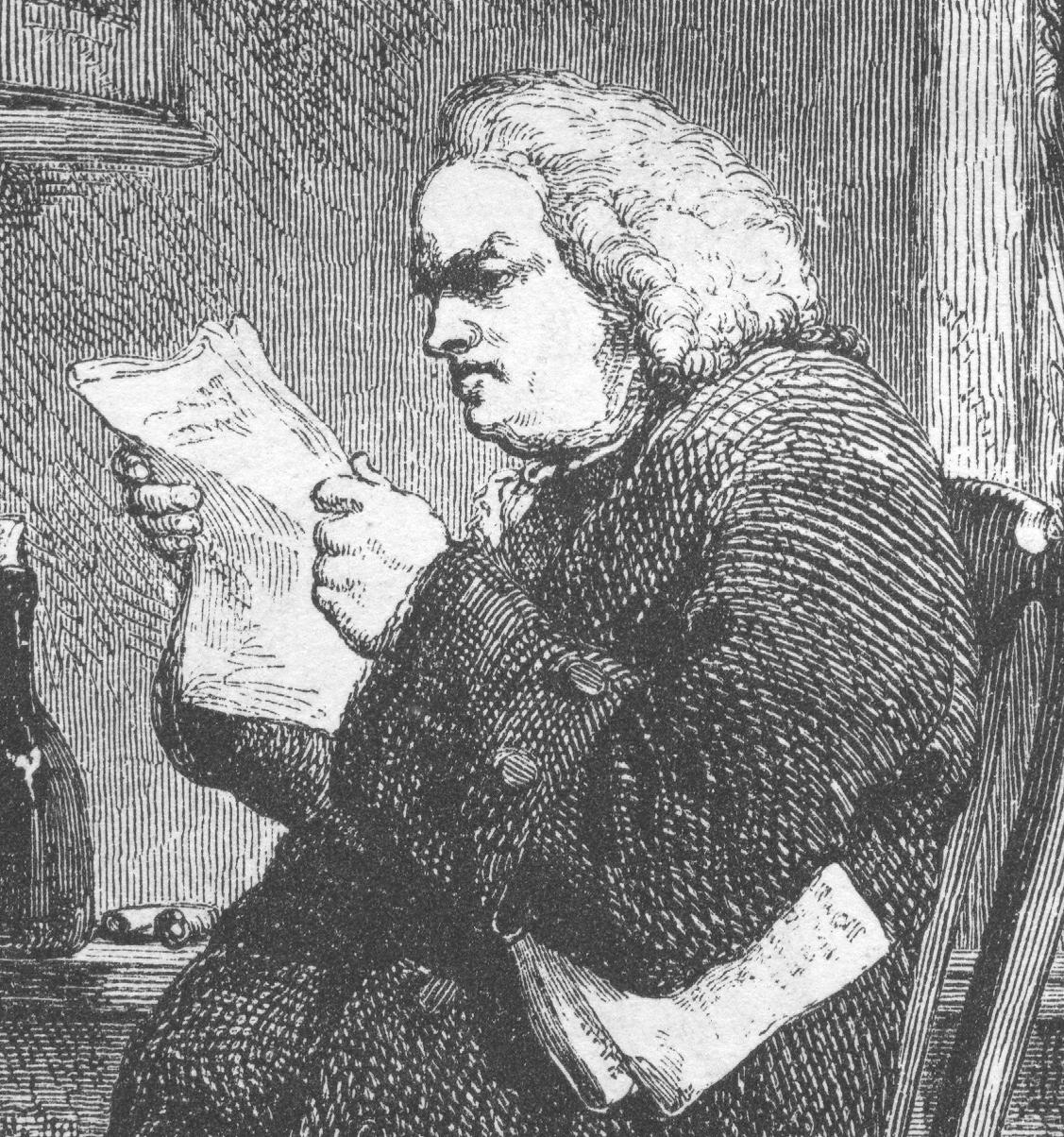
Samuel Johnson used the word ahoy in his writings

==== Consolidation ====
In the 1799 edition of Samuel Johnson's dictionary the word "ahoy" (pronounced /əˈhɔɪ/) is still missing, but in the 1824 edition it was said "to be almost as important as holla", supported by a quotation from Cumberland in 1813. The first entry in this popular reference book can be seen as an acceptance of "ahoy" into the English language. In the first half of the 19th century the word already began to find its way into many neighbouring languages. A speculation from 1835 about the origin of the French word oyez, which means "hört!" in German, implies an early philological engagement with the word. It had already appeared in a metaphorical context before, when in the American trade town of Philadelphia a preacher started to build a church for sailors in 1819. According to his memoirs, sailors used to greet him with "Ship ahoi" and to ask where he was going. The preacher used to answer back: "To the New Jerusalem harbour". We sail under the admiral Jesus, a good captain. We need men: "As the sailors said right before they were taken on: "Now we come in and listen to your conditions"

==== The variant "ohoy" ====
The variant ohoy was used early on as a synonym for ahoy. In one anecdote, printed in 1791, it appears as the ironic greeting of a captain to his boatman who is dressed up like a Romney Marsh Sheep when he entered the stage: "Ohoa, the boatswain, the Romney, Ohoy!" The "boatswain answered "Holloa" and disappeared. The Scottish poet Thomas Campbell published a satirical poem in 1821, in which a rider shouted: "Murderer, stop, ohoy, oh". In 1836 the Scottish novelist Allan Cunningham wrote: "Ohoy, Johnnie Martin! Ohoy, Tom Dempster! be busy my "merry lads, and take me on board".

The form "ohoy" has been adopted by several Nordic languages.

Their dictionaries give the English ohoy as a single source word, usually before ahoy sometimes afterwards.

=== German, diffusion ===
==== Research ====
The term remained widely unknown to German readers until 1840s, since the translators of popular maritime literature of the time avoided it. 1843 saw the first German translation of the word å-hoj to "hiaho" from a Swedish novel.

The earliest documentation of the term in German language appears not in non-fictional maritime texts but the nautical prose. In the beginning, the circumstances point to uncertainties regarding the usage of the word. Since the late 1820s, the words ahoy and ahoi marked with the coda -i, a feature demonstrating Germanization of ahoy, can be found in the German translation of English novels and fictions. Around the same time, the term was used by authors in original German texts on rare occasions. Ahoi became an established term around 1950 as it was used in the works of widely-read authors from the 1940s onward.

The term rarely appeared in dictionaries in the 19th century. It is not included in the "Urduden" dictionary published in 1880. The Grimm brothers’ Dictionary of German (Deutsches Wörterbuch) did not recognize the word at the time; it did not appear in the first volume, published in 1852, with entries up to the keyword "allverein". The DWB's second edition published in 1998, documents the earliest uses of the term as occurring in 1846 and 1848. In addition, the original index cards for the dictionary, which are kept in the Berlin-Brandenburg Academy of Sciences, do not contain any earlier entries. The standard work "Etymologisches Wörterbuch der deutschen Sprache" by Friedrich Kluge lists ahoi as a separate entry since the 1999 edition.

The automatic search for appropriate keywords in digitalized books on the internet and in offline-databanks does only lead to a few useful results. German light fiction was printed so badly in the first half of the 19th century that even today good recognition software still produces a great number of errors, so that records are not found. Research in original catalogues is still necessary for a systematic search.

==== Early evidence in translation ====
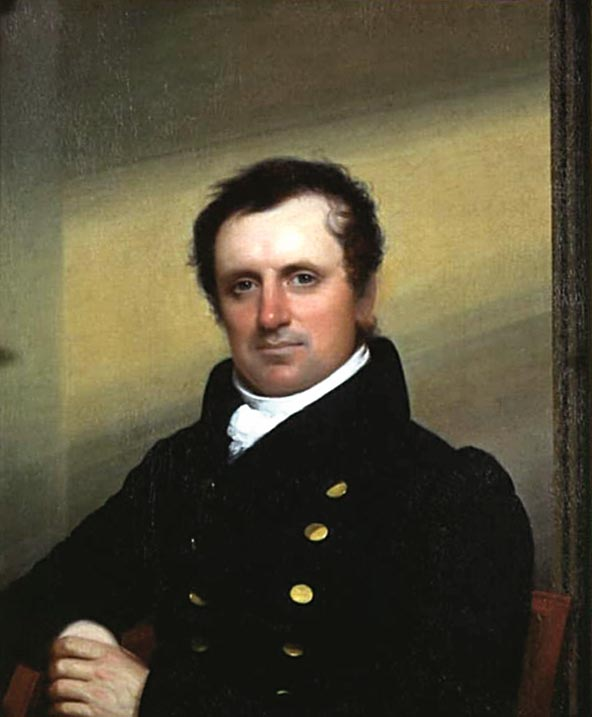
The word ahoy appeared for the first time in 1828 in German translations of James Fenimore Cooper's novels

The earliest creditable use of the word ahoi dates back to 1828. In 1827 the American story-teller James Fenimore Cooper published his pirate story The Red Rover. The following year der rothe Freibeuter was released in Frankfurt am Main. The translator Karl Meurer did not translate all of the words. The command "All hands make sail, ahoy!" was translated as "Alle zu Hauf! Die Segel hißt!", but later on in the novel ahoy was translated as aho, which could have been a moment of inattention. However, Meurer translated the phrase "All hands to mischief, ahoy!", as a signalled approval of amusement on board and so became "Alle zu Hauf! zu Possen, ahoi!". Meurer also translated the phrase "Good humour, ahoy!" with "Bei den Possen gehalten, ahoi!"

In 1830 Cooper used the word ahoy five times in a story whose title was the same as the name of the ship Water Witch (German Wassernixe). A translation by Gottfried Friedenberg was released in the same year and he chose ahoi four times. Friedenberg missed out the first occurrence of the word ahoy. It is possible that in 1830 the German word was relatively new. In later editions this mistake was corrected. Friedrich Knickerbocker, who published the second translation in 1831, overlooked or rewrote ahoy also incorrectly as "Holüber!"

The "Wer da", or "Who's there?", the phrase he introduced once was not new. In 1824 and 1827 the German editions of Cooper's story The Pilot were released, in which ahoi was translated with similar expressions, such as "Wer da!", "Wer da?", "heda" or "He! He!". Not until 1842 in der Lotse (English, the pilot) ahoy became the standard interjection due to Eduard Mauch's translation, however this contained four ahoys and one ahoi.

In 1835 and 1836 the anonymous translator of the two-volume story Trelawney's Abentheuer in Ostindien, which was published by sailor and later author Edward John Trelawny in 1832, who kept ahoy as a loanword.

In 1837 the novel Lykkens Yndling/Das Glückskind was released in Danish by the author Carl Bernhard, who had also translated it into German. Bernhard was the pseudonym of the Danish novelist Andreas Nikolai de Saint-Aubain. This is probably the earliest import from a Scandinavian language and gave us the phrase "Ahoi, en Sejler" meaning "Ahoi, ein Segler!" (English - ahoy, sailor!).

==== Early evidence in German source texts ====
The expression ahoy is documented in a German source text from 1829. In her short story Die Armenierin, the Saxon writer Charlotte Eleonore Wilhelmine von Gersdorff inserted this word several times in a specialist context, both as an invocation and to express encouragement. The author also worked as a translator from English.

The Austrian writer Charles Sealsfield first used the word ahoy in its original form. Sealsfield, who was also known by his real name Carl Anton Postl, lived temporarily in New Orleans, where he had many contacts with sailors. In his novel Morton oder die große Tour, which was published for the first time in Zürich in 1835, a big crowd of excited people in Piccadilly Circus in London is summoned with the exclamation "Gare! Gare! take care! Hallo ho! A hoy!". The same exclamation is still to be found in the following editions of 1844 and 1846. In the footnotes to a reprint, the word Gare was appropriately corrected to Care, but wrongly used in the text in all three editions. The English form is correctly given, in two words, which was very common at that time.

In Sealsfield's novel Pflanzerleben (Zürich, 1836), the word is used before uttering an order: "Ahoi! Ahoi! (...) Hört ihr nicht? die Pferde dem Herrn Grafen abnehmen.", that is "Ahoi! Ahoi! (...) Don't you hear? Take the Count's horses." An English translation of the book appeared in the United States in 1844, in which the word ahoi is kept in its German form. Also in his last novel, Süden und Norden (1843), Sealsfield again used the English spelling, in two words: "Sail a hoy – an ennemys sail!" The translation in a footnote to that page reads: "Kapitän, ein fremdes (feindliches) Segel."

In one of Ernst Willkomm stories from 1838, Jan, one of the characters in the story shouts "Ship Ahoy" as loud as a thunder from the cliffs of Heligoland. This was misprinted as "ship ahni" by the German newspaper Zeitung für die elegante Welt (English: A Newspaper For the Elegant World), in which Willkomm's Lootsenerzählungen (English: Pilot Stories) first appeared. The misspelling was corrected when the story was published in a book in 1842. With its meaning apparently unknown to the publisher, the word reappeared in the same German newspaper in a narrative called Johann Pol. An Image of life in the west indies by an anonymous author in 1838. The said narrative depicts sailors from all around the world chanting "Ahoi, oi" while loading the ship.

The 1844 Politik an einer Wirthstafel by Friedrich Giehne uses the words 'Waitress, Ahoy' in an expression addressed towards a waitress by a character. The story was published in a book which included mostly reissues of materials printed between 1836 and 1843. However, there was no mention of when the said story was first published or whether or not it was actually a reprint. What is interesting is that the word "ahoy" was used on and off the ship. One such example of an off sea usage can be found in Smollet's novel The Adventures of Peregrine Pickle in 1751 in which commodore Trunnion utters " Ho, the house, Ahoy!". It is likely however, that Giehne might have borrowed the term from Smollet as he could have read an 1840 translation of Smollet's work by Georg Nikolaus Bärmann from English to German.

In 1844, The German author Heinrich Smidt used the term "Ahoy" in parts of a pre-print version of his novel titled Michael de Ruiter. Pictures of Holland's Marine which was published in 1846 in the Magazine for the Literature from Abroad of which he was the editor. The term was also used in another one of his narratives in 1844 titled Hexen-Bootsmann. There is no trace of "ahoy" in the recently digitized versions of Smidt's works originally published between 1837 and 1842, however, the term has a continuous presence in all of his works since 1844 until his last novel which was published in 1866. Therefore, it is likely that Smidt added the word to his vocabulary sometime in 1843.

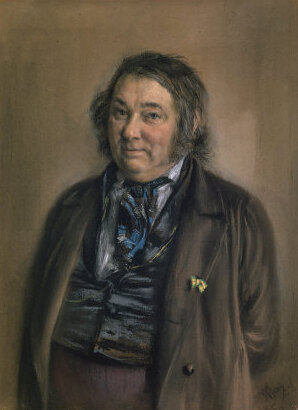
Since 1844, Ahoi often appears in writings by the German sailor and writer Heinrich Smidt

Friedrich Gerstäcker was one of the most successful and popular German authors of adventure novels in the 19th century. As was the case with Smidt who started using Ahoy in 1844, Gerstäcker, who translated a lot from the English, also suddenly used the term in 1847. "Ahoi – ho – ahoi! meine braven Burschen" (English: "Ahoi – ho – ahoi! My well behaved fellows"), is what he writes in the Mississippi pictures. In 1848 the sentence: "Boot ahoi! schrie da plötzlich der gebundene Steuermann" (English: Ship ahoi! shouted the helmsman suddenly"), appeared in Gerstäcker's novel Flusspiraten des Mississippi (English: The Pirates of the Mississippi).

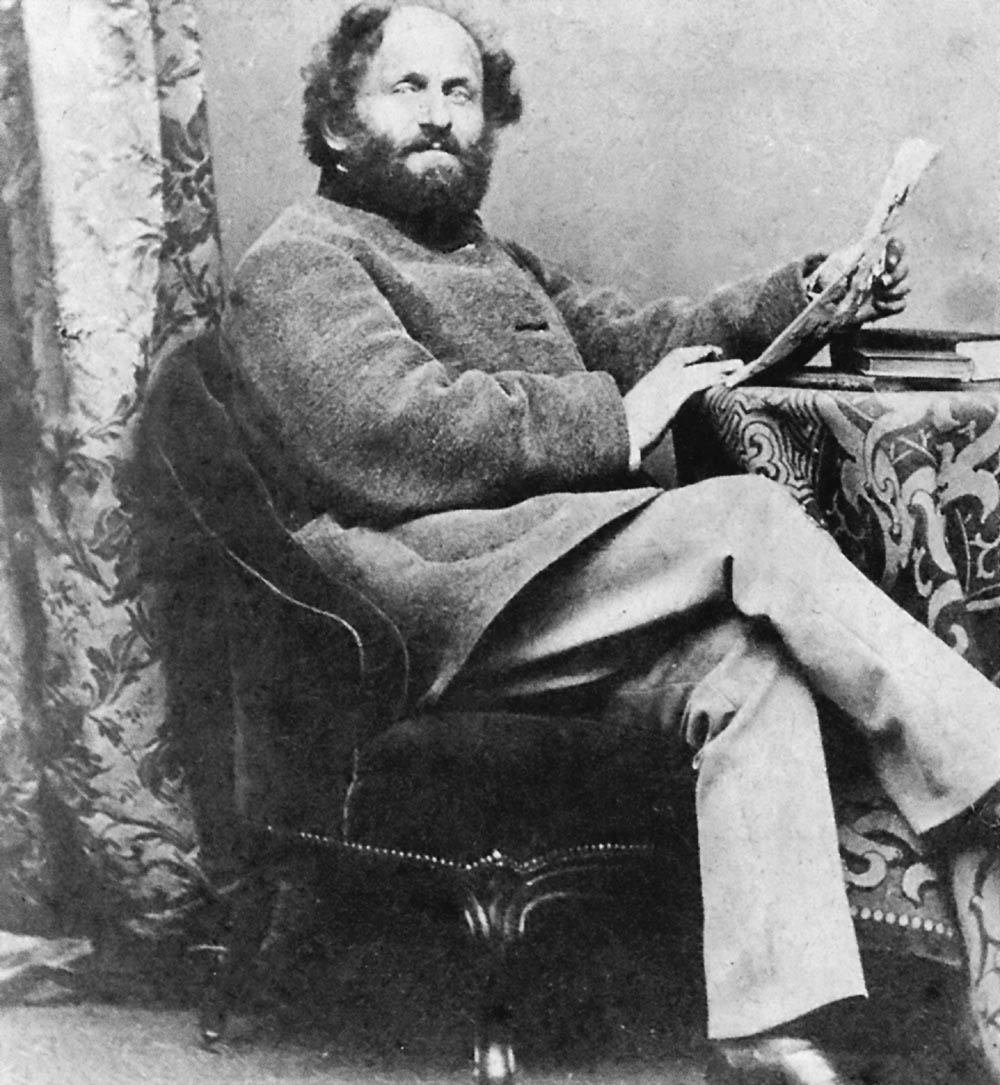
In 1848, Friedrich Gerstäcker popularized ahoi in his bestseller Die Flusspiraten des Mississippi (English:The Mississippi River Pirates)

=== The use of ahoi in German ===
==== Maritime context ====
For Wilhelm Heine, a world traveler, the cry was "common" in 1859. But Heine was on a voyage with sailors from the United States, who were already using the common English form. For Germans in Livland on the Baltic Sea the use of ahoi was explained in a dictionary from 1864: " ahoi [...]. disyllabic, and with stress on the second syllable." In the 19th century it was "all in all rather seldom" used in Germany. About 1910 it was a "modern imitation" of the English ahoy, which later became an uncommon cry. In non-maritime fields ahoi is also used to say goodbye. In literature, many writers used ahoi in a mostly maritime context:

- Paul Heyse (1900): "Er sah mit übermütig herausforderndem Blick zu den drohenden Wolken empor und ließ ein helles Ahoi! ertönen."."
- Carl Sternheim (1909) als Mitteilung an die Crew: "Eine Stimme vom Mast: Land ahoi!"
- Anna Seghers (1928): "Ein paar Burschen von vorn liefen auf eine Höhe, schrien Ahoi, winkten mit den Armen."
- Hans Fallada (1934) als Warnruf: "Ahoi! Ahoi! Mann über Bord!"
- Friedrich Dürrenmatt (1951): "Ahoi! Die Segel gelichtet [sic!], weg, zu anderen Küsten, zu anderen Bräuten!"
- Günter Grass (1959): "Warum aber Matzerath winkte und solch einen Blödsinn wie ‚Schiff ahoi!‘ brüllte, blieb mir schleierhaft. Denn der verstand als gebürtiger Rheinländer überhaupt nichts von der Marine".
- Hermann Kant (1972): "Da ging dieser Mensch aus dem Haus, sagte ahoi, Franziska, küßte einen auf die Nase, alles wie immer …"
- Ulrich Plenzdorf (1973): "Ahoi! Hast auch schon besser gehustet, no?"

The word created a maritime atmosphere in many songs which were composed after the period of the Tall ships, but without the traditional meaning of ahoi. In 1934 the song Wir lagen vor Madagaskar was composed with the first line of the chorus "Ahoi Kameraden". This can be seen as a sailors' song. The Pop song Schön ist die Liebe im Hafen with the final line of the chorus "Auch nicht mit Fürsten und Grafen / Tauschen wir Jungens, ahoi!" is based on a waltz, which was also composed in 1934. The Edelweiss Pirates probably adopted ahoi from Czech teenagers and used it as a greeting even after the group was banned in 1933. It was also used by Rammstein as a bridge on the 2003 song Reise, Reise from the album with the same name. The song has a nautical theme about fishermen.

Paul Heyse used ahoi in 1900 to challenge the elements

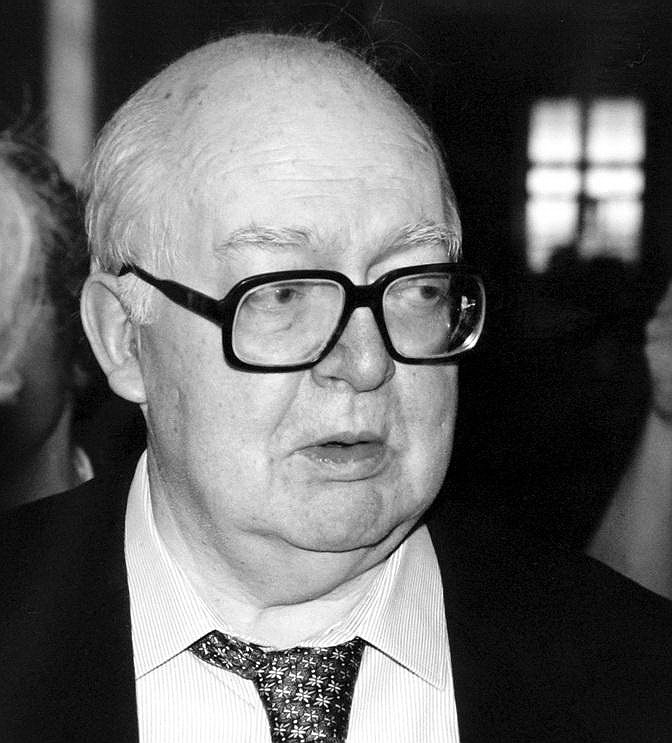
Friedrich Dürrenmatt deemed ahoi fit for a radio play in 1951

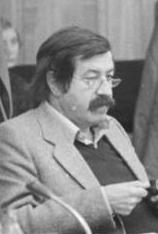
Günter Grass wrote ahoi ironically to caricature a landlubbing character in 1959

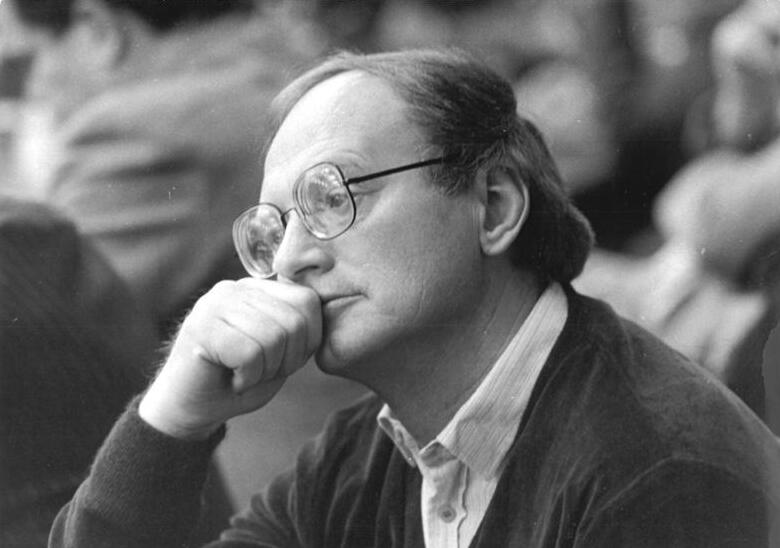
Hermann Kant used ahoi in 1972 as a parting phrase

==== Watersport ====
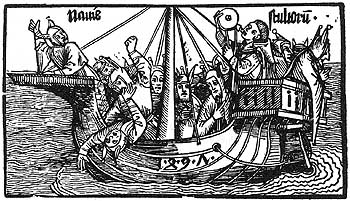
Albrecht Dürer's Narrenschiff (Ship of Fools) (1495). In carnival parades the crew of a ship of fools greets the audience with ahoy!

People who sail as a hobby adopted ahoi from those who sail as a living. From 1884 to 1887 the publication Ahoi! initially appeared as Zeitschrift für deutsche Segler (Magazine for German sailors), later as Zeitschrift für den Wassersport (Magazine for Watersport). In 1892 the Berlin sailing club Ahoi was founded. There's evidence of ahoi as a "sailor's call" in the area of Lake Constance in the 1920s. With the watersport's increasing popularity it came back into existence in the 1960s. Since then ahoi is also used as a formal greeting to officials on board, e.g. "Käptn ahoi!", or without an additional element. The use is considered by professionals unseamenlike and you should completely avoid the cry ("ahoi!"). Its use is severely marked down on board and can destroy the whole level of newly formed, hard-earned trust. This already dying word has been revamped by lyricists once more. A rubber dinghy shipyard distributed from 1964 to 1992 their customer magazine Wiking ahoi (Viking ahoy).

==== Carnival ====
Ahoi, alongside helau and alaaf, is a word used to make a fool of somebody during the Carnival period. After sailors, stevedores and inland fishermen adopted the expression from the coast, it was made popular by the Carnival societies. During the parades, the crews of the Ships of fools greet the people on the roadside with Ahoi!, and they return the same greeting. It was also traditionally used in the former territory of the Palatinate, in Mannheim as "Monnem ahoi" or "Mannem ahoi!" and in Ludwigshafen, but also in bordering areas like northern Baden Altlußheim, as well as in southern Thuringian Wasungen, as "Woesinge ahoi!". The Carnival society Milka, foundend in 1908 in Upper Swabian Ravensburg, shouts the greeting "Milka - ahoi!". During the Backfischfest of the fishermen's guild in Worms, the greeting "ahoi" is employed as well. Also newer Carnival groups, for example one northern German association, and a new group in Cologne, refer to this call.

==== Military ====
In the German and Austrian Marines, before World War I, the boats which approached a warship lain at anchor were called using the expression "Boot ahoi!", in order to find out who was on board. The answers from the warships depended on the most senior person on board: "Standarte!" was the reply if the boat was approaching with a royal on board; "Flagge!" with an Admiral; "Ja, ja!" with an Officer and "Nein, nein!" without any official. It worked in a similar way with "boat ahoy" in the U.S. Navy, where the procedure was established for the first time in 1893, and in the Royal Navy. In the German Navy the greeting "Ahoi" is no longer used. In its place the Northern German term "Moin" is used.

Amongst the German warships between 1815 and 1945 only one motorboat of the Kriegsmarine was called Ahoi. It was adopted in 1940, so it probably already had that name, and it drove on the Kaiser-Wilhelm Canal. In June 1945 the former owner, J. Pieper & Co., took possession of it again. The catapult ship Bussard, on duty in 1942, was sold in 1947 as USA spoils of war to the Belgian shipping company Heygen in Ghent, and renamed Ahoy.

From 1940 to 1943 the Phänomen-Werke Gustav Hiller company manufactured 125cc motor scooters for the German Wehrmacht in Zittau, under the name Phänomen Ahoi.

"Nebel - ahoi!" is used by the ABC-Abwehrtruppe, a defence division of the Bundeswehr, and it belongs officially to the military tradition of the army. The expression originated among the Nebeltruppe, a Wehrmacht brigade group from 1935, whose job it was to create a chemical fog over a battlefield before destroying the target areas with mass fire. The expression originated in a moment of euphoria, after the fog successfully covered its target.

==== Candy ====
Ahoj is the name of a Sherbet brand developed in Stuttgart in 1925. Named after the term ahoi it has been advertised with the picture of a sailor and a flag since 1930. At this point there was a fashion for Sailor Suits for children. In the USA term is used for the popular cookie brand Chips Ahoy! produced by Nabisco, a play on the term "ships ahoy!".

==== Cattle drive ====
In one particular case Åhoi is used as an instruction to the cattle to slow down. It was found before World War I in the Ore Mountains and it was used in the same way as eha and oha, ooha(a). It is possible that this is a combination of two interjections, as in Middle English, though eha might come from the typical Ore Mountain form eh "ein, inne", as ee halten "an-, ein-, innehalten". The new standard dictionary for this language area lacks an entry for åhoi, ahoi or oho. In a valley in the Slovenian Triglav area shepherds use the call Ohoi! to communicate over long distances, according to a report from 1838.

=== Dutch ===
==== Theories of origin ====
If the origin of ahoi is rooted in Dutch, then hoy originates from hoie, which is the name of a sailorboat that today is known as a Hoie or Heude. This common type of boat was used to transport passengers and cargo along the coast of the North Sea and across the English Channel. In a letter from 1495 "an Hoye of Dorderyght" from the Dutch trading town Dordrecht is mentioned. Then, two years later the term "an hoye of Andwarpe" appears in documents belonging the English King Henry VII. In his travel accounts from 1624 John Smith, who tended to exaggerate, counts an enormous number of sails in the region between Vlissingen and the Sea of IJsselin: "Holland and Zeeland hath twenty thousand saile of Ships and Hoies."

However, there is a lack of direct evidence that links the origin of ahoi to the particle a and the noun hoie. In Dutch linguistics the call is thought to be an adaption from English. This is indicated by the amount of evidence found in English and the lack thereof in Dutch, as well as criticism of the idea that in the Early Modern Period a word could be formed from a simple expression for a ship.

The relation of ahoi and hoi, which is a common form of address in Dutch, is unclear. Hoi, which had been proven to be an exclamation of joy as early as 1552, could also be a short form of ahoi or ahoi could be an extension of hoi. Most likely hoi belongs to a group of calls such as hó and hé and is not closely related to ahoi at all.

==== Sources ====
Aho(o)i, ahoy and ehoi are rather uncommon in Dutch and are not included in numerous specialist dictionaries. This could be due to the prevalence of the similar and shorter exclamation hoi.

The sources for earlier uses of the term are lacking, because ahoi did not get its own lemma in the Woordenboek der Nederlandsche Taal (WNT), even though this comprehensive dictionary includes interjections. In addition later editions of the WNT from recent decades lack this entry. The earliest entries of forms of ahoi in the WNT can be found around 1900. The author Tine van Berken wrote "A-hoi! A-hoi! riep Beer onvermoeid, de hand trechters gewijze aan de mond", which roughly translates as "A-hoi! A-hoi! called Beer relentlessly...", in a book for girls that was published in 1897. In 1908 author George Frans Haspels wrote "met donderend ahoei", "with thundering ahoy", referring to the forces of a storm that hit the coast. Here the meaning was extended to refer to noise. If Haspel was alluding to the sound of the wind, the spelling ahoei, which is pronounced [a ˈhuːi], contains an onomatopoeic element.

In the 1950s ahoi was considered outdated. However, the expression was still generally known. Evidence for the use of ahoy in Friesian are lacking in comprehensive dictionaries of that language.

==== Ahoy in Rotterdam ====
Ahoy also refers to the short form of the Rotterdam Ahoy, a big conference center in the Netherlands. It originally consisted of only one hall that was used for the exhibition Rotterdam Ahoy! in the 1950s. The exhibition was held as part of the reconstruction of the city after the war and was originally called Ahoy’, the additional accent is intended to remind the reader of the exclamation mark in the name of the exhibition. In 1968 it was moved to the district of Charlois and developed into an extensive complex of buildings over the years.

Charlois is the place of origin of the Tamboer- en Trompetterkorps Ahoy, the Tambour- and Trumpetcorps Ahoy, founded in 1955. We do not know whether it was called this because the term ahoy expressed the sense of reconstruction in Rotterdam at the time and was already outdated in a maritime context.

The marching band first performed on the Koninginnedag (Queens' Day) in 1956 and became more popularly known because of their innovative formations, their previously uncommon antiphonal singing and faster marching music. In 1962 they won first prize at the Wereld Muziek Concours in Kerkrade and later played at the Sanremo Music Festival. The group split up in 2003 because of a lack of successors. The Show-Musikkorps Ahoy-Hamburg was founded in Hamburg in 1975.

=== Scandinavian languages ===
==== Forms ====
Scandinavian languages have adopted derivatives of the English form ahoy and ohoy in various different spellings. In Danish it is ahoj and ohoj, also ohøj, aahøj oder ohej, in Norwegian ohoi, in Swedish ohoj and å-hoj. In Icelandic ohoj can be combined with the English word ship; which takes the form Sjipp og hoj (Ship ahoy). This is also used in Norwegian, as Skip ohoi.

In at least Swedish, there have been some interchange with åhej! (heave-ho!).

==== Early evidence ====
In 1837 the Danish novelist Andreas Nikolai de Saint-Aubain, who published under the pseudonym Carl Bernhard, used the phrase "‚Ahoi, en Sejler!‘ raabte Matrosen fra Mærset". In the same year Saint-Aubin's German translation "‚Ahoi, ein Segler!‘, rief der Matrose vom Mers", is an example of early evidence in the German-speaking world. The Swedish author Emilie Flygare-Carlén wrote in 1842: "Örnungen reddes till en ny färd på den klarnade böljan; manskabet skrek sitt muntra ‚å-hoj!‘" The German translator of 1843 avoided the use of å-hoj and formulated it as such: "The young eagle was prepared for a new journey through the clear waves; the crew let out its cheerful shout of Hiaho." In the English translation of 1844 it was however, "The crew of the young Eagle […] shouted their cheerful ahoys." In 1846 Flygare-Carlén wrote "Båt, ohoj – hvarifrån, hvathän?", English "Ship, ahoy - where from, where to?" But in English-Danish dictionaries from 1863, ahoy is given as "Hey! Holla!" und "holla! heida!"

==== Finnish and Estonian ====
In Finnish the interjection is derived from the Swedish ohoj and becomes ohoi. In a German-Finnish dictionary ahoi (German) is written as hoi (Finnish). A translation from either Low German or English ahoy into the related language of Estonian is pronounced and spelt ahoi.

=== Czech and Slovak ===
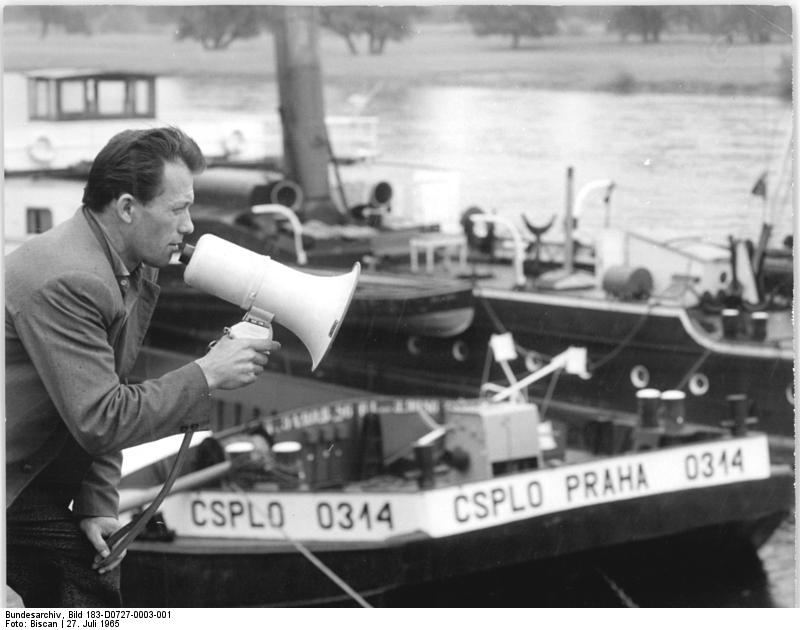
Czechoslovak cargo ship in traffic in Magdeburg on its way to Hamburg on the Elbe, 1965

==== Theories of origin ====
In Czech Republic and Slovakia (former Czechoslovakia), ahoj (pronounced [aɦɔj], ahoj) is an everyday greeting. The following are folk explanations for why ahoj is used in this part of Central Europe:

- Czech sailors had brought it with them from Hamburg. The haulage company ČSPLO, in German Tschechoslowakische Elbe/Oder-Schifffahrt operated in the lot of Moldauhafen in Hamburg. which had been leased to Czechoslovakia in 1929, as a hub for freighters, which included the barracks ship Praha.
- When Czech sailors' shore leave ended at the Czech industrial harbours of Vltava and the upper part of Labe, as a way of saying goodbye, Czech prostitutes from bars in the harbour warned their customers of their occupational disease syphilis with the wordplay "A hoj! Kdo nehojil, tomu upad" - "And heal (hoj, pronounced ɦɔj, is an imperativ of the verb hojit - to heal, cure). So in English it means literally "Cure it, as whoever does not cure it, he will have his member fallen off."
- Czechoslovak Merchant Navy sailors with their high sea ships had brought the word with them when they went home for summer.
- After having travelled to America in the 18th century the evangelical Moravian Church, which originated in Bohemia and Moravia, passed on this nautical knowledge, even the shout, to those from their former homeland.

The international call which is sometimes accredited to a Bohemian sailor in the 17th century has since been proven to be wrong. However the Czech Language Institute rejects all of the above, stating that it was first referred to in an 1888 (spelt Ahoi as in German) as a greeting used by sailors, and that by the time of a 1935 dictionary the use had spread from sailors to boaters and scouts (see also the German section for the boaters' magazine titled "Ahoi").

==== nazdar, ahoj, čau ====
The spread of ahoj mainly dates back to the 1920s, when Czech adolescents and students populised canoeing on the South Moravian and Bohemian rivers. The canoers formed a type of movement called Wandervogel, some called themselves trampové, Tramps, or skauti, Scouts. As early as the 1930s Czech linguists believed the skauti as the carriers and distributors of the word ahoj.

These groups formed a romantic opposition against the nationalistic Czech middle-class*. The Czech Sokol movement with its preference for traditional gymnastics did not fit the adolenscent's spirit of optimism and progress, which cultivated an internationally and trendily* perceived sport with its own greeting. They positioned their form of ahoj from sailors, which possibly coming from the lower parts of Germany, against Sokol's nazdar, Czech for hail. Nazdar was used in general across the Czech and Czechoslovak society, but within a few decades, the modern-day ahoj replaced this old-fashioned expression.

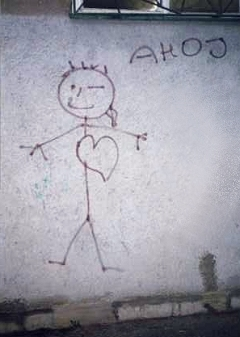
Graffiti on a wall of a house in Bratislava, 1997

The Czech and Slovak ironic love of language contributed to the distribution of ahoj. In Slovakia ahoj-derivates are used in variety of different scenarios, such as the diminutive "ahojček", as a toast "ahojka", to a greater extent the plural-form "ahojte", as well as the grammatically correct we-form "ahojme sa". In Czech as well as in Slovak ahoj is being slowly replaced by the modern-day form "čau", which comes from the Italian greeting ciao. This has been perceived to be the case since the Czechoslovak government allowed the Italian films to be shown in the 1960s.

==== Usage in youth culture ====
The daily newspaper České slovo (English - Czech Word), which belongs to the publishing company Melantrich in Prague, called a humorous supplement Ahoj na neděli (English - Ahoy on Sunday), which appeared between 1933 and 1943. It was distributed on every Friday, "in order to provide the tramps in time with their weekend lecture." From 1969 until 1997 the leisure supplement Ahoj na sobotu (English - Ahoy on Saturday) appeared in České slovo's successor Svobodné slovo (English - Free Word).

Ahoj is the official name of a district in Nové Mesto which is a part of the Slovak capital city Bratislava. Adolescents met there before the Second World War, when the region was barely built.

The car manufacturer Skoda called its prototype for a city car Škoda Ahoj! in 2001.

The Simpsons character Mr. Burns uses the term ahoy-hoy as a greeting while Australian comedian duo Hamish and Andy has used the term ahoy as the shows preferred greeting after finding out Graham-Bell wanted the term to be used following the invention of the telephone.

==== Teasing usage in Theresienstadt ====
In Theresienstadt concentration camp Czech-speaking Jews called jokingly non-believing inmates, who had assimilated to the Czech society, Ahojista, (English - "ahoy-ers"). A Jewish Czech who had assimilated and posed opportunistically as a Zionist for the camp's Jewish administration centre, was called Šahojista, which was composed of the greetings Schalom and Ahoj.

Acronyms
When Czechia and Slovakia, called the Protectorate of Bohemia and Moravia, was occupied by Germany in the 1930s, ahoj could be understood as an acronym for the watchword "Adolfa Hitlera oběsíme jistě", English - "We'll hang Adolf Hitler for sure." Under the communist government ahoj developed into an acronym in the Slovak part of the country. Since the struggle between the Church and the State from 1950 it was used as an acronym to console people in hardship Aj hriešnych ochraňuje Ježiš, English Jesus also protects the sinners, or for the Latin ad honorem Jesu, English For the glory of Jesus. Demonstratively catholic adolescents use it amongst themselves. Even priests used it to address the congregation from the pulpit.
