= Robur LO 3000 =

LO 3000
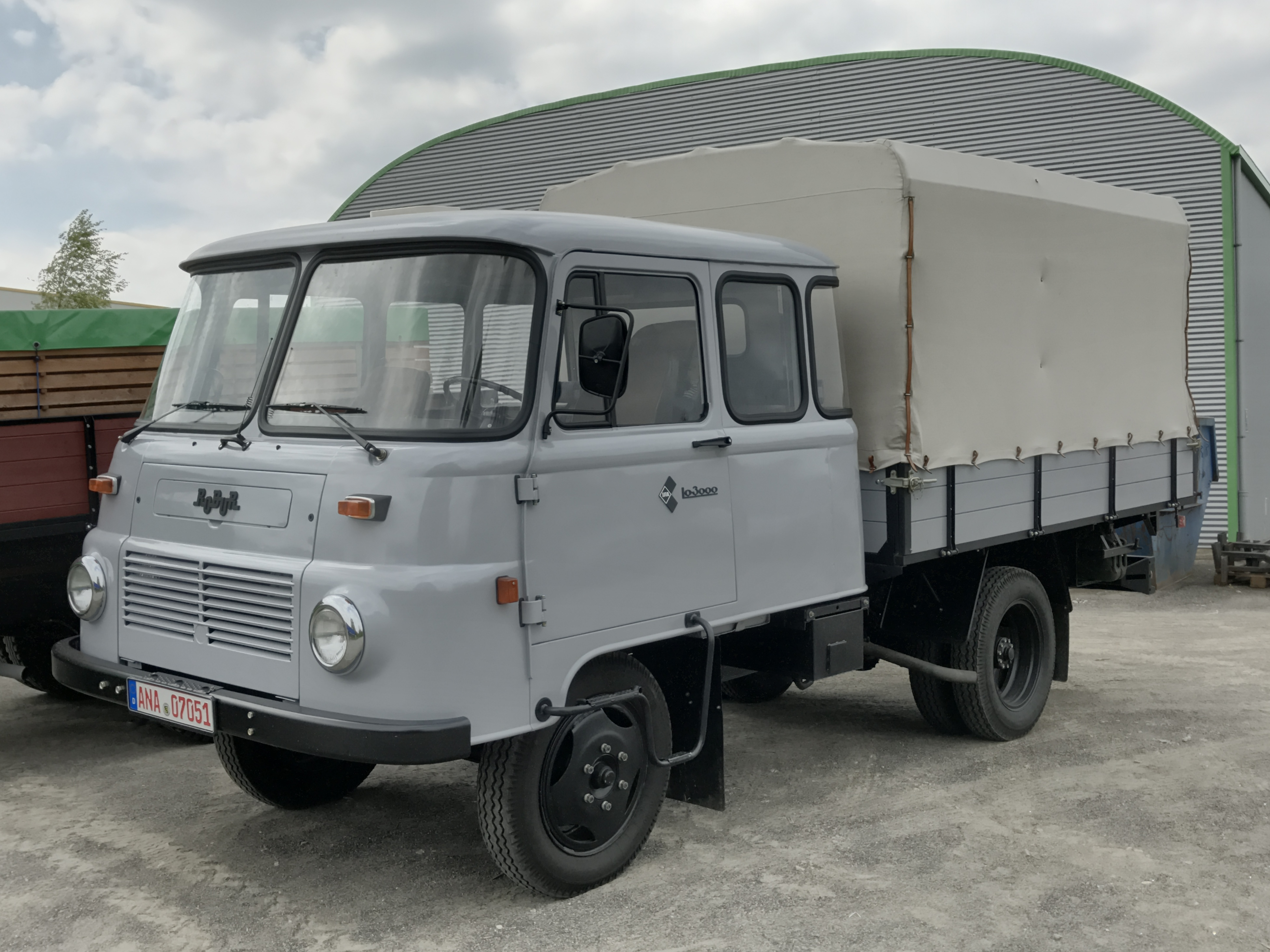
- LO 3000 double-cab

Overview
- Type: 3-ton lorry
- Manufacturer: VEB Robur-Werke Zittau
- Also called: Ello
- Production: 1973–1984
- Assembly: East Germany: Zittau

Body and chassis
- Class: 3.0 t truck
- Body style: Forward control truck
- Layout: Front engine, rear-wheel-drive
- Platform: Robur
- Related: LO 3001, LD 3000, LD 3001

Powertrain
- Engine: LO 4/2 (Otto, 3345 cm^{3}, 55 kW)
- Transmission: Manual five-speed synchromesh gearbox
- Propulsion: Tyres

Dimensions
- Wheelbase: 3025 mm or 3270 mm
- Length: 6075 mm
- Width: 2405 mm
- Height: 2490 mm
- Kerb weight: 2600 kg

Chronology
- Predecessor: Robur LO 2501
- Successor: Robur LO 3001

The Robur LO 3000 is a 3-ton lorry made by the East German industrial vehicle manufacturer VEB Robur-Werke Zittau from 1973 until 1984. The vehicle was sold under IFA's Robur brand. It is the civilian rear-wheel drive Robur model of its time, and was produced alongside the all-wheel drive Robur LO 2002 A model. The LO 3000 is powered by an air-cooled Otto (petrol) engine; a dieselised version of the LO 3000, called the LD 3000, was made from 1982 until 1984, albeit in small numbers. As with its predecessors, the LO 3000 was made in several different versions. The VEB made the vehicle with two different wheelbase options, and offered more than twenty different body styles, including a bus version.

Compared with its predecessor, the LO 3000 has a more powerful engine, ball-and-nut steering, an improved braking system, and thus a higher payload. From 1972 until 1979, the East German design bureaus designed a successor for the Robur LO 3000 – alongside the IFA L60 –, the O611/D609. Despite this design's progression to a point where it could have been put into series production, it was abandoned in favour of keeping the LO 3000 in production. In 1985, the LO 3000 was eventually replaced by the LO 3001, a version of the LO 3000 with minor modifications such as smaller wheels and a skid plate.

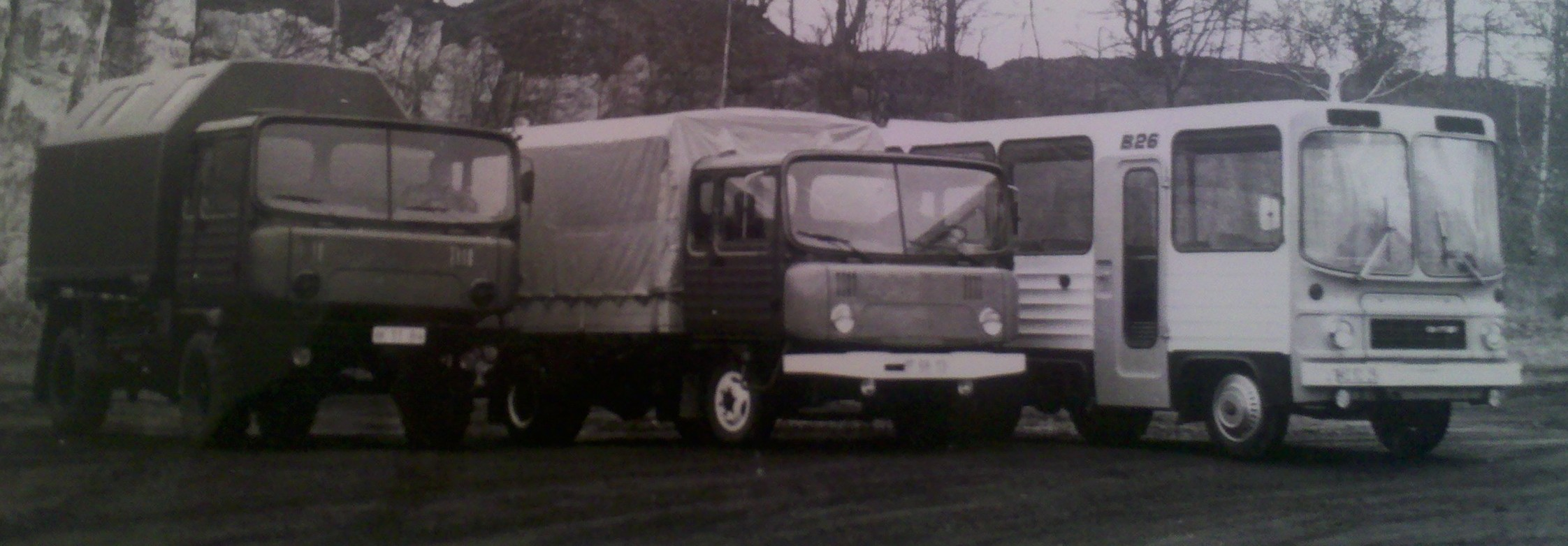
Robur O611/D609 series in 1975

== Technical description ==
The LO 3000 is a small, two-axle lorry designed for a payload of 3000 kg. It is based upon a conventional forward control, body-on-frame design with a longitudinally mounted front engine, and rear-wheel drive. The frame is a flexible ladder frame welded together from two U-profile longitudinal members with four round cross members, two U-profile cross members, and a rear cross member designed for a trailer hitch; the maximum permissible trailer mass is 2600 kg. In front, the LO 3000 has a forged stub axle (dead beam axle), in rear it has a simple tubular type live axle that consists of two axle tubes that are flanged to the axle's differential gearbox. Both axles are leaf-sprung and fitted with two hydraulic shock absorbers each. The steering system is a conventional ball-and-nut system. Untypical of a lorry, the LO 3000 has a vacuum-assisted hydraulic dual-circuit braking system with – typical of a 3-ton lorry – duo servo drum brakes. Unlike its off-road lookalikes, the LO 3000 has tapered bead seat rims and 6.50–20 inch crossply tyres.

The lorry is powered by an LO 4/2 Otto (petrol) engine. The LO 4/2 is an air-cooled, 3.345 dm^{3}, straight-four, four-stroke engine with a cast iron crankcase, four finned single cylinders, and four crossflow cylinder heads. It has a forged crankshaft with three bearings, aluminium pistons, and a chain-driven camshaft that is located in the crankcase. Each cylinder head has high-squish combustion chambers, and is fitted with two overhead valves. The LO 4/2 engine has a BVF 36 F1–8 downdraught carburettor. From the engine, the torque is sent through a dry single-disc clutch to a WF23K1S4M five-speed manual constant-mesh gearbox, designed for an input torque of 226 N·m. It has synchromesh on all gears except first and reverse.

== Technical specifications ==
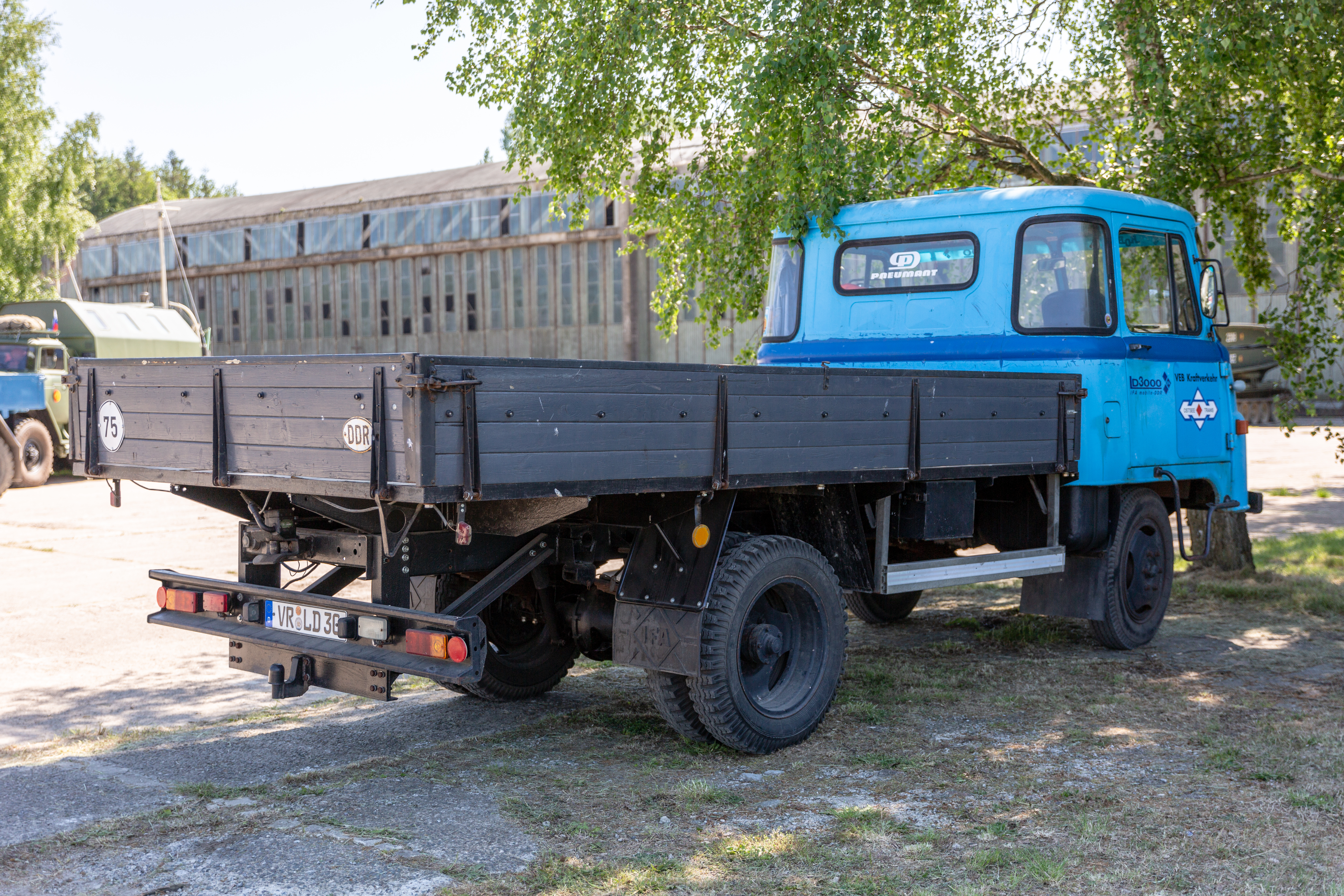
Rear view

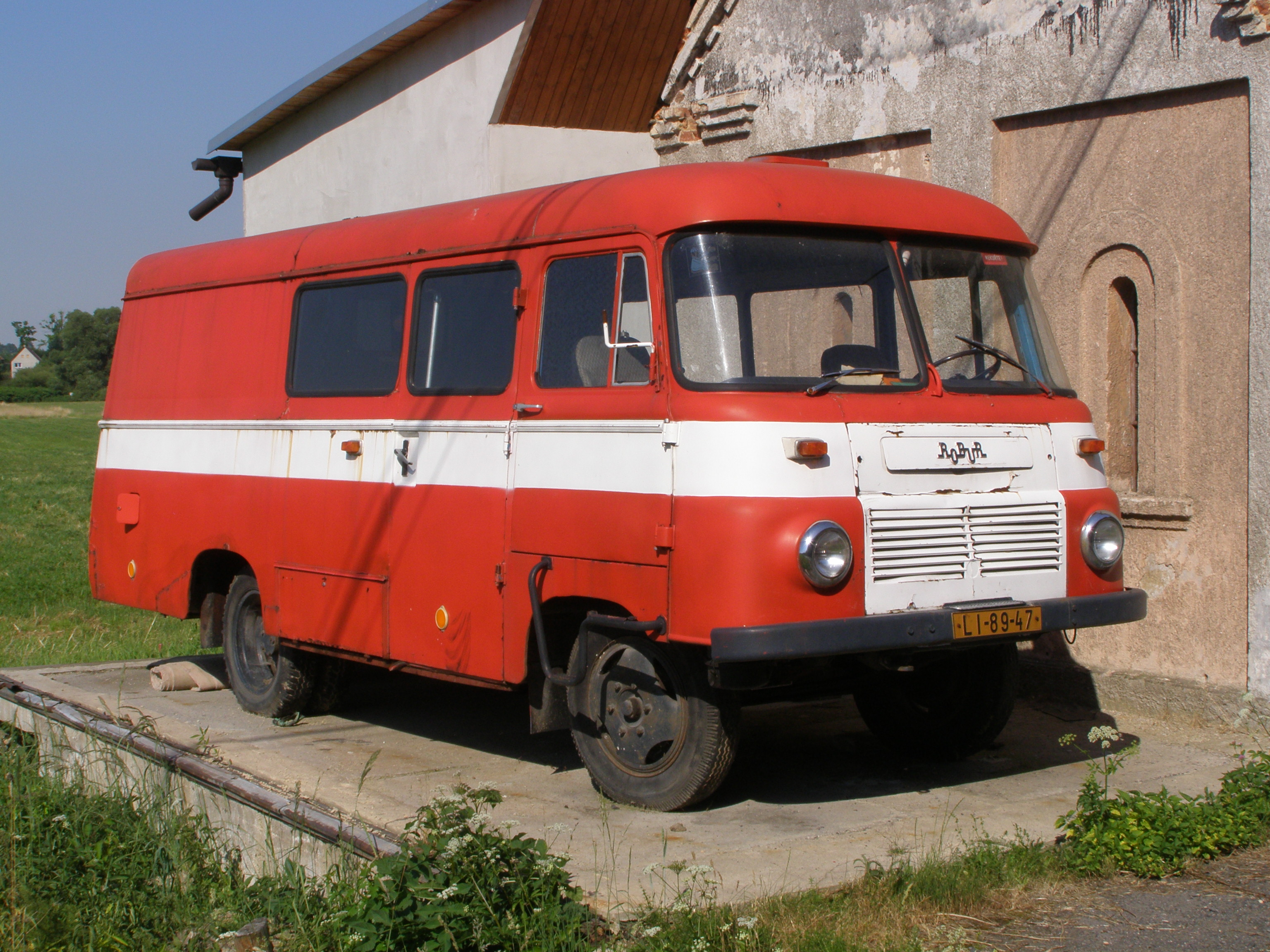
Robur LO 3000 bus

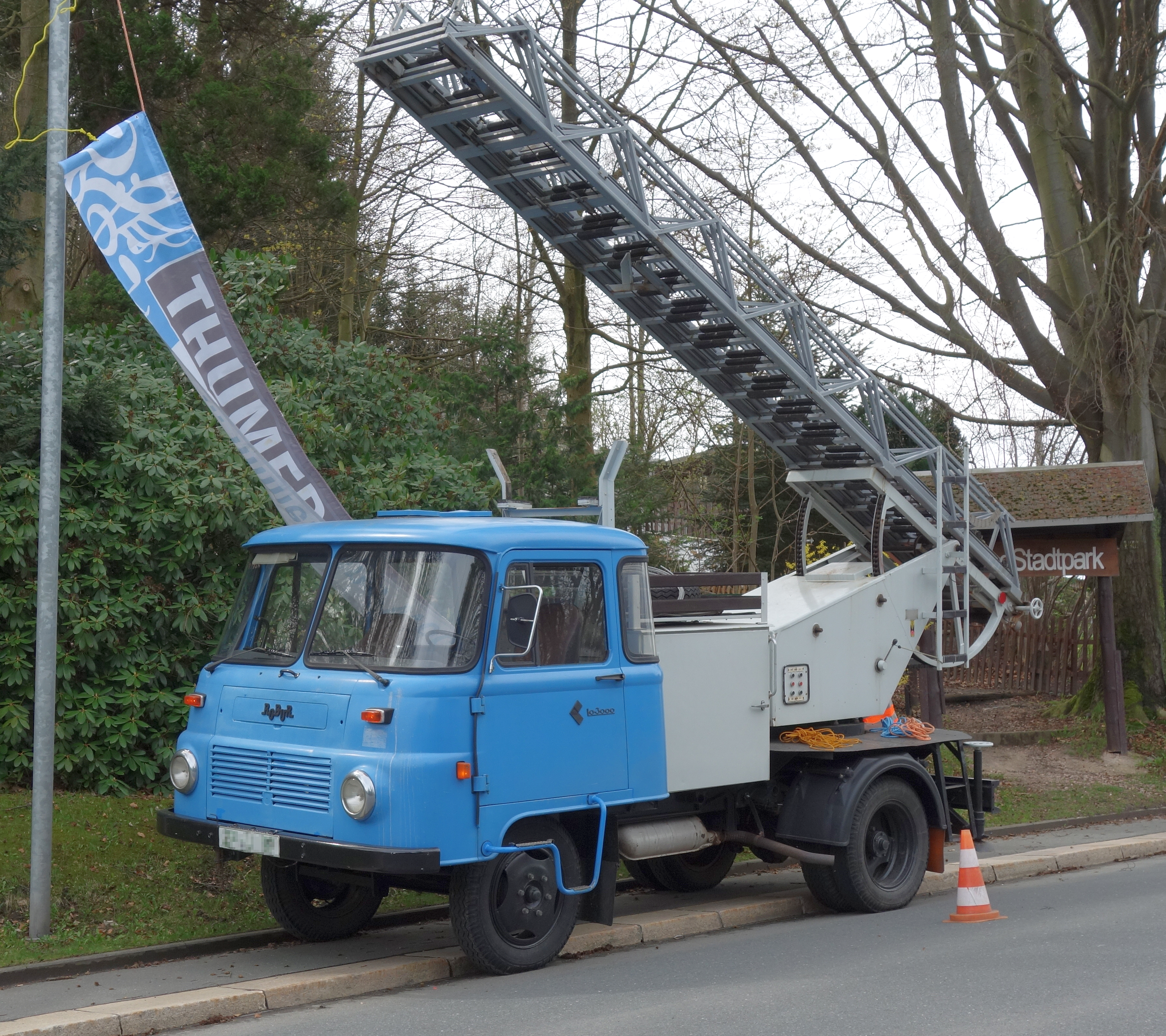
Robur LO 3000 single-cab crane

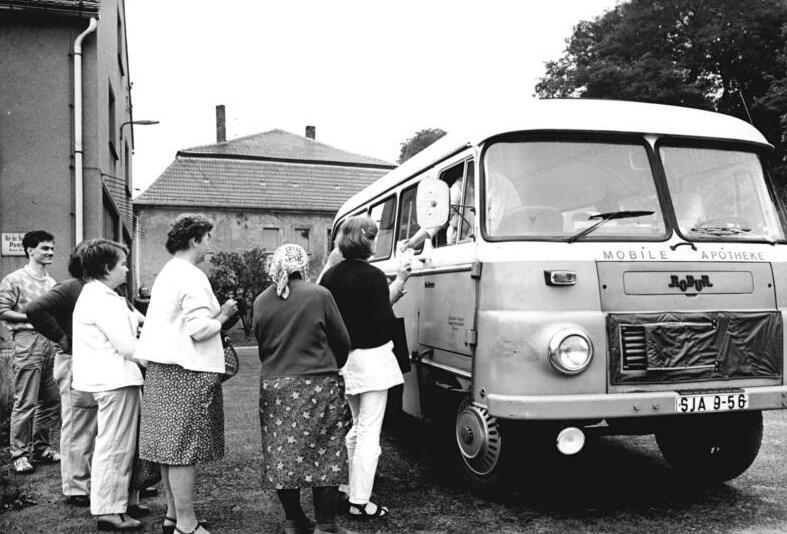
LO 3000 based mobile pharmacy

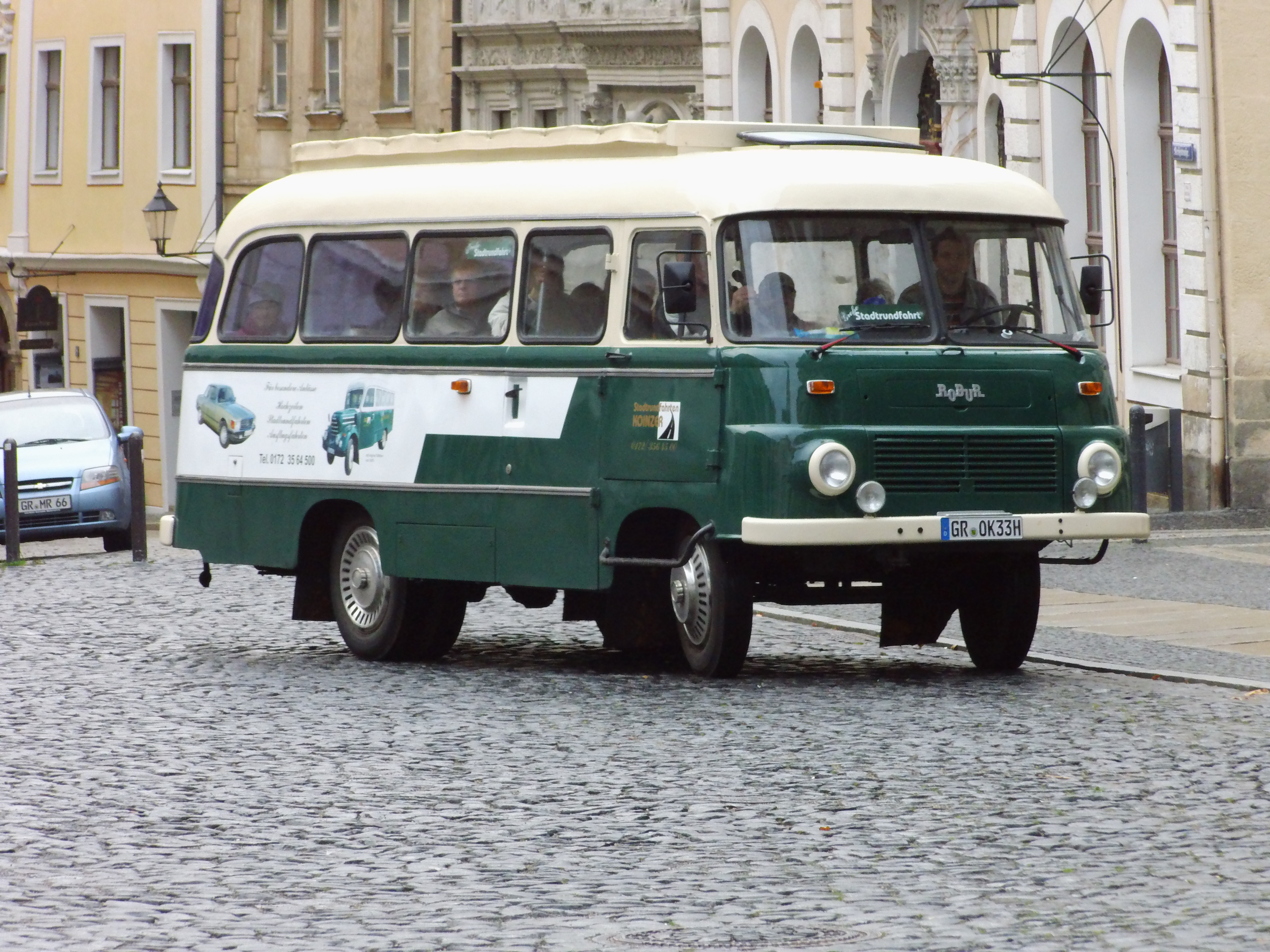
Robur LO 3000 bus

Technical specifications
	Robur LO 3000
Engine
Engine type	LO 4/2
Operating principle and layout	Straight-four, air-cooled, four-stroke, OHV otto engine with crossflow cylinder heads, downdraught carburetter and battery ignition system
Bore × Stroke, Displacement	95 × 118 mm, 3345 cm^{3}
Rated power (TGL 8346)	75 PS (55.2 kW) at 2800 min^{−1}
Max. torque	23 kp⋅m (225.6 N⋅m) at 1900 min^{−1}
Fuel type	VK 79 (leaded petrol, 79 RON)
Compression (ε)	6.4±0.2
Lowest fuel consumption	<326 g/(kW·h) at 2200 min^{−1}
Source, unless otherwise stated	
Powertrain
Layout	Front engine, rear-wheel drive
Differential locks	No differential locks
Tyres	4× 6.5—20″ single tyres
Clutch	T20-30 K single-disc dry clutch
Gearbox	Five-speed manual synchromesh gearbox; first gear and reverse gear unsynchronised; dog-leg shifter
Measurements
Length	6075 mm
Width	2405 mm
Height	2490 mm
Wheelbase	3025 mm
Track width	front: 1560 mm rear: 1530 mm
Ground clearance	250 mm
Top speed	85 km/h
Mass	2600 kg
Payload	3100 kg
GVW	5700 kg
Fuel tank	90 L
Fuel consumption (TGL 39-852)	18 L/100 km
Source, unless otherwise stated	
Electrical system
Generator	DC generator, 41.7 A, 12 V, 0.5 kW
Battery	1 × Lead-acid battery, 12 V, 84 A·h
Starter	12 V, 1.3 kW
