= Ahiv =

Ahiv or AHIV may refer to:

- Asymptomatic HIV, see HIV/AIDS § Clinical latency
- Ahiv, Middle High German interjection, see Ahoy (greeting) § ahiu, â hui
- A Haunting in Venice, 2023 American mystery film

== See also ==
- HIV subtype A, see Subtypes of HIV (HIV/AIDS virus)
