= Top Naeff =

Dutch writer (1878–1953)

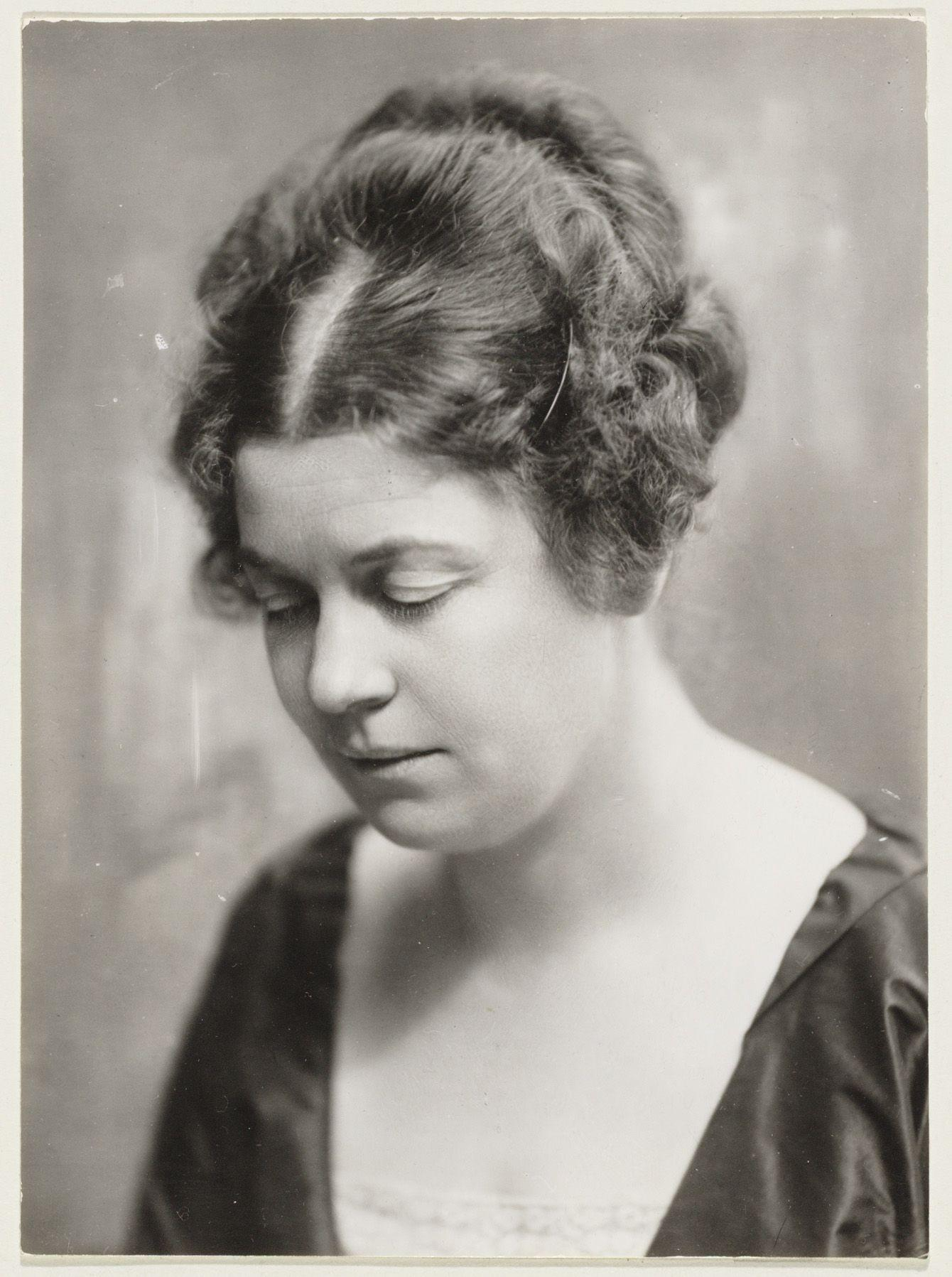
- Born: Anthonetta Naeff; 24 March 1878; Dordrecht, Netherlands
- Died: 22 April 1953 (aged 75); Dordrecht, Netherlands
- Occupations: Writer, critic, editor
- Spouse: Huibert Willem van Rhijn
- Writing career
- Language: Dutch
- Period: 1900–1951
- Genre: Young adult
- Notable work: Schoolidyllen

Top Naeff (1878-1953) was a Dutch writer.

== Life ==
Top Naeff, the only child of strict parents, did not excel at secondary school. She married a family doctor, but later fell passionately in love with the director and actor Willem Royaards. Royaards, also married, did not reciprocate in the way she wanted.

Naeff's first novel, School Idylls (1900), told the story of a teenage orphan, Jet van Marle, brought up by a loveless aunt and uncle. The novel was inspired by Louisa M. Alcott and Tine van Berken. In her first adult novel, At the Gate (1912), the protagonist Liesbeth van Landschot is frustrated by her violent passion for a man who is unaware of her feelings.

Naeff reviewed plays widely for De Groene Amsterdammer. She succeeded her friend Herman Robbers as editor of Elsevier's Geïllustreerd Maandschrift (Elsevier's Illustrated Monthly).

== Works ==
- Schoolidyllen [School Idylls], 1900
- Oogst, 1900
- De tweelingen, 1901
- 't Veulen, 1903
- De dochter, 1904
- In den dop, 1906
- De stille getuige, 1906
- Voor de poort [At the Gate], 1912
- Vriendin, 1920
- Charlotte von Stein: een episode, 1921
- Voorbijgangers: vier verhalen, 1925
- Voorbijgangers, 1925
- Letje, of De weg naar het geluk, 1926
- Klein avontuur, 1928
- Offers ... [Sacrifices...], 1932
- Een huis in de rij [The Terraced House], 1935
- Juffrouw Stolk, en andere verhalen, 1936
- Willem Royaards: de tooneelkunstenaar in zijn tijd, 1947
- Zo was het ongeveer, 1951
