= Moin =

Germanic greeting meaning "hello"

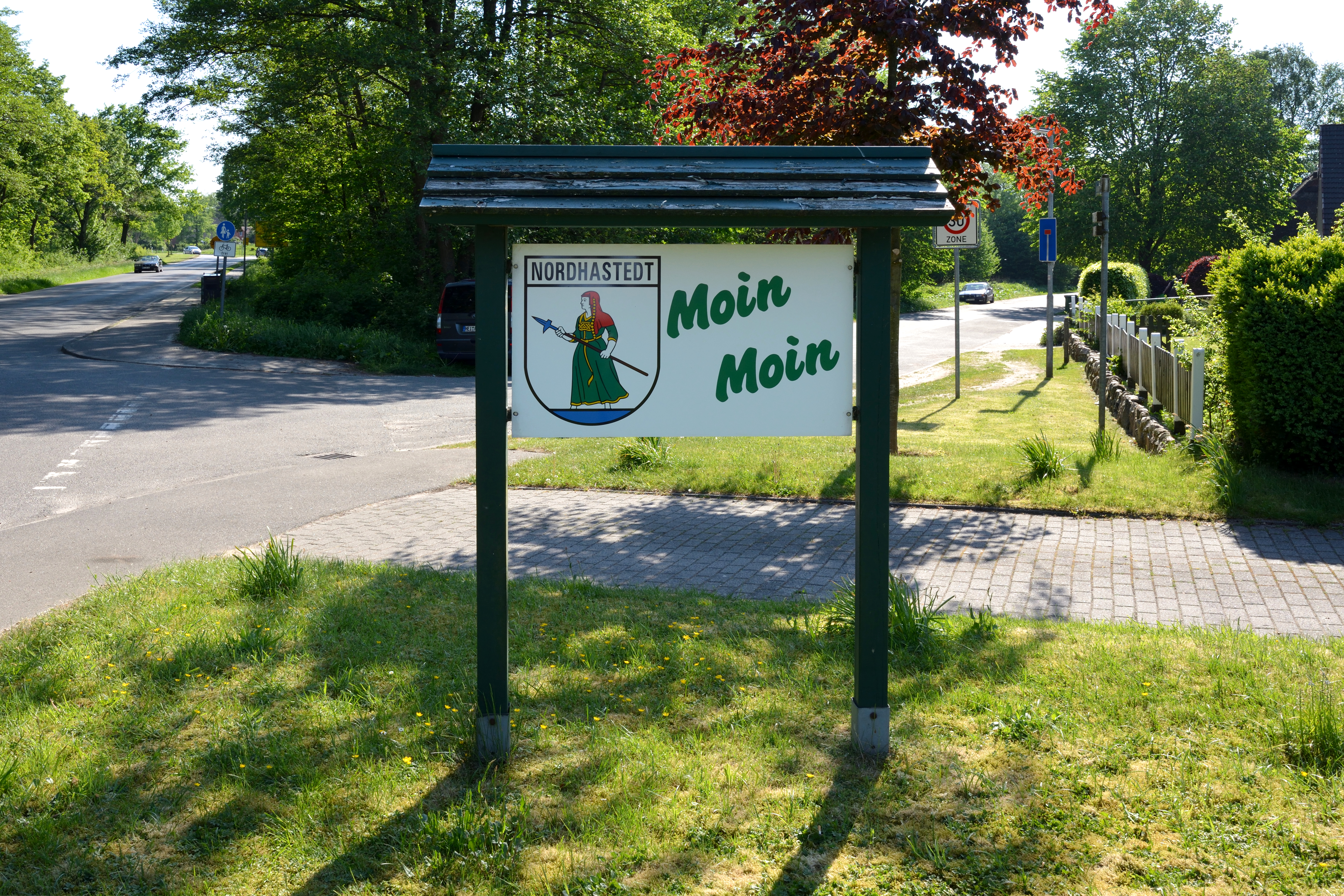
Sign greeting visitors to Nordhastedt, Schleswig-Holstein.

Moin, moi or mojn; is a Low German, Frisian, High German (moin [moin] or Moin, [Moin]), Danish (mojn) (mòjn) greeting from East Frisia, Northern Germany, the eastern and northern Netherlands, Southern Jutland in Denmark and parts of Kashubia in northern Poland. The greeting is also used in Finnish (moi) and Finland swedish (mojn).

It means "hello" and, in some places, "goodbye" too.

== Usage ==
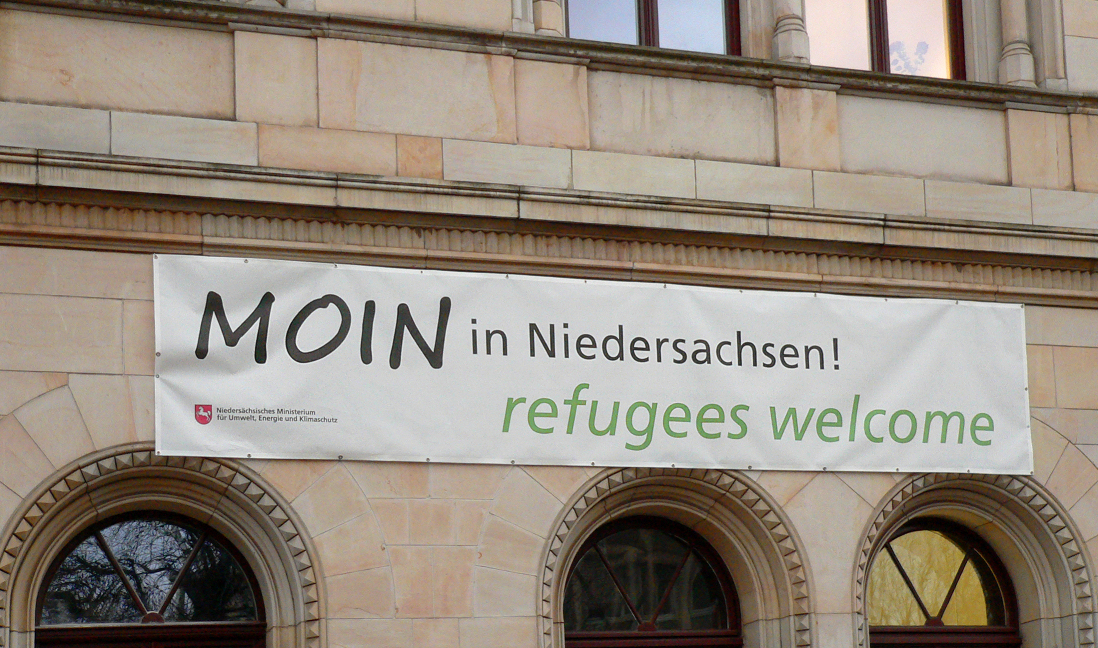
Banner greeting visitors to the Lower Saxon Ministry for Environment, Energy, and Climate Protection

Moin is used at all times of day, not just in the morning (see Etymology section below). The reduplicated form moin moin is often heard, although some authors claim it is regarded by locals as tourists' usage.

== Etymology ==
Due to the similarity of the words one might think that moin derives from various regional pronunciations of (Guten) Morgen ("good morning"), which tend to alter, vocalise, or skip rg. However, the word may actually also derive from the Dutch, Frisian, and Low German word mo(o)i, meaning "beautiful" or "good". Similar forms in Low Saxon are mooien Dag, mooien Abend, mooien Mor(g)en. Possibly, as is common in etymology, one origin is correct (from Morgen or mooi) but spread thanks to its oral assimilation with the other term.

The Luxembourgish cognate of the word is moien, which can mean either "hi" or "morning" (gudde Moien! means "good morning!"). Interestingly, in the area of Germany bordering Luxembourg, it is common to use moin, instead of moien.

Unlike Guten Morgen, moin can be used at any time of day. It is semantically equivalent to the Low Saxon (Plattdüütsch) greeting Dagg and replaced it in many areas. In Hessen, mojn is used for hello and good bye, but mojn mojn is solely used for good bye. The double form Moin Moin is also used as an all day greeting in for example Flensburg that belonged to Denmark until 1864.

== Moi ==
In Finland, a similar greeting moi (pronounced [ˈmoi̯]) is used for "hello", "hi" in the Finnish language. It may have been borrowed from German in the 19th century. The earliest records of the word occur in Southeast Finland, which had strong connection through Viipuri to partially German-speaking Estonia and Latvia. However, moi moi is used as a good bye, similarly to "bye bye" in English, even with a similar intonation. Both are particularly typical of Southwestern Finnish, but through internal migration spread to the capital and with the help of TV to the rest of the language area. Moi's use is identical to that of hei: diminutive forms heippa and moikka, and duplication as a good bye.

Moro is found in some parts of Finland and has also been used in the same way as moi. It is theorised that it comes from Tampere due to its large number of foreign workers and like moi has been borrowed from morrow and abbreviated.

Moi is also used in Dutch Low Saxon dialects in the eastern part of the provinces Groningen and Drenthe.

== See also ==
- MoinMoin (wiki software named after the greeting)
