= Robur LO 1800 A =

LO 1800 A
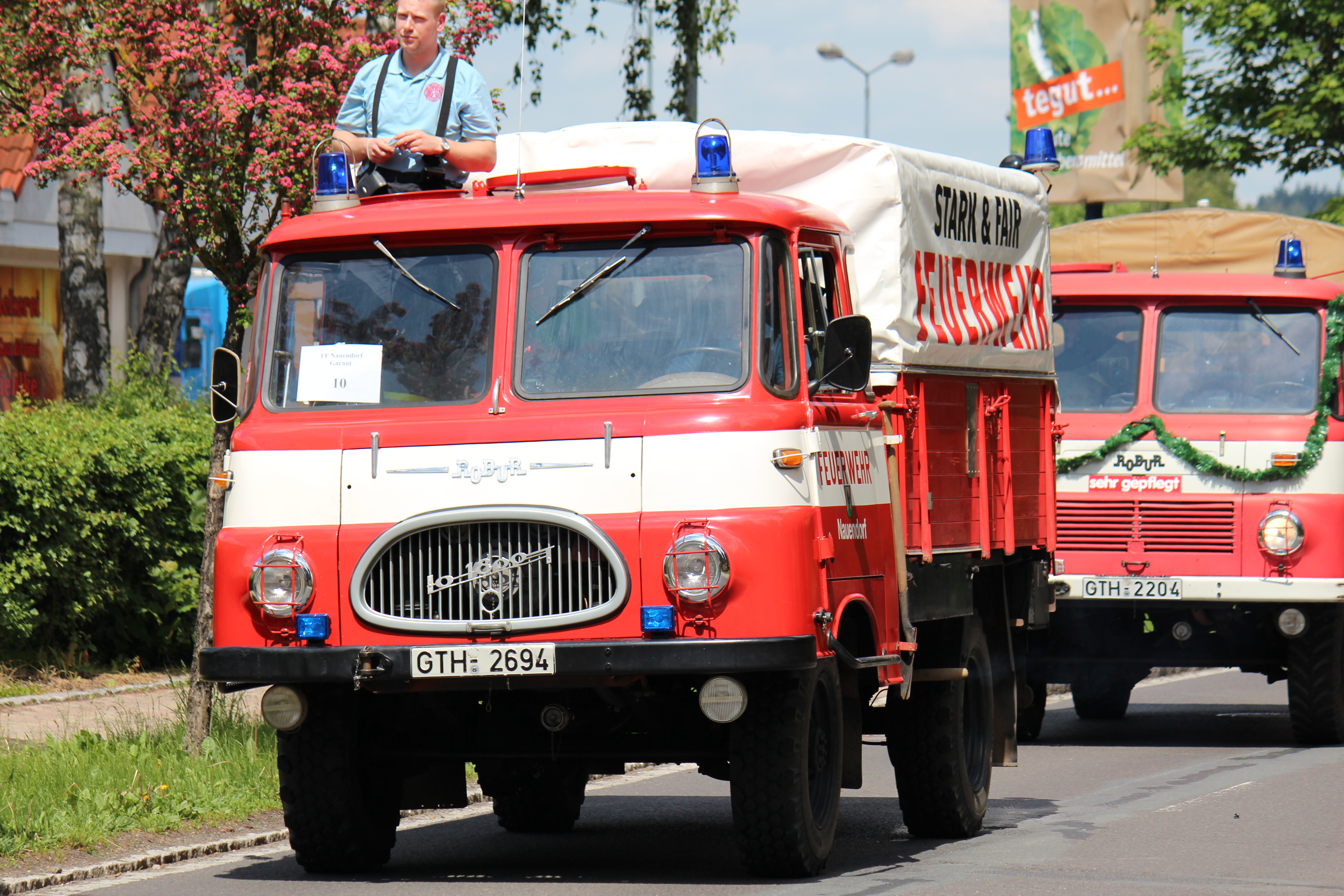
- LO 1800 A fire engine

Overview
- Type: Truck
- Manufacturer: VEB Robur-Werke Zittau
- Production: 1960–1967
- Assembly: East Germany: Zittau

Body and chassis
- Class: 1.8 t truck
- Body style: Forward control lorry
- Layout: Front engine, all-wheel-drive
- Platform: Robur
- Related: LO 2500 / LD 2500

Powertrain
- Engine: LO 4 (Otto, 3345 cm^{3}, 51.5 kW)
- Transmission: Manual five-speed gearbox
- Propulsion: Tyres

Dimensions
- Wheelbase: 3025 mm
- Length: 5755 mm
- Width: 2365 mm
- Height: 2770 mm
- Kerb weight: 3200 kg

Chronology
- Predecessor: none
- Successor: Robur LO 1801 A

The Robur LO 1800 A is a lightweight off-road lorry, made by East German manufacturer VEB Robur-Werke Zittau from 1960 to 1967, alongside the on-road model LO 2500. The LO 1800 A is a forward control lorry, and has rear-wheel drive with switchable front-wheel drive. Its name is an abbreviation for Luftgekühlter Ottomotor, 1800 kg, Allrad (air-cooled otto engine, 1800 kg payload, all-wheel-drive). Powered by a 3.35 L, carburetted, Robur LO 4 engine, rated 70 PS (51.5 kW) at 2800 min^{−1}, and mated to a five-speed gearbox, the LO 1800 A can reach a top speed of 82 km/h.
