= Heinrich Smidt =

German writer (1798–1867)

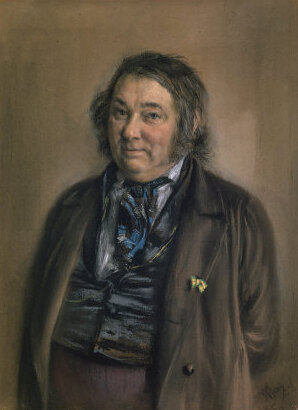
Heinrich Smidt, painted by Adolph von Menzel, 1850

Heinrich Smidt (1798–1867) was a German writer. He wrote novels and adventure stories about the sea, as well as the article "Die Klabautermann", about the German water sprite of the same name, in the German publication Seegemälde in 1828.
