= Robur (truck) =

East German truck manufacturer

- Formerly: Phänomen-Werke Gustav Hiller; VEB Robur Werke Zittau (from 1957)
- Company type: Private
- Industry: Automotive
- Founded: 1888; 138 years ago
- Founder: Karl Gustav Hiller
- Defunct: 1991
- Successors: Robur-Fahrzeug-Engineering GmbH; FBZ GmbH Zittau
- Brands: Phänomen; VEB Phänomen Zittau

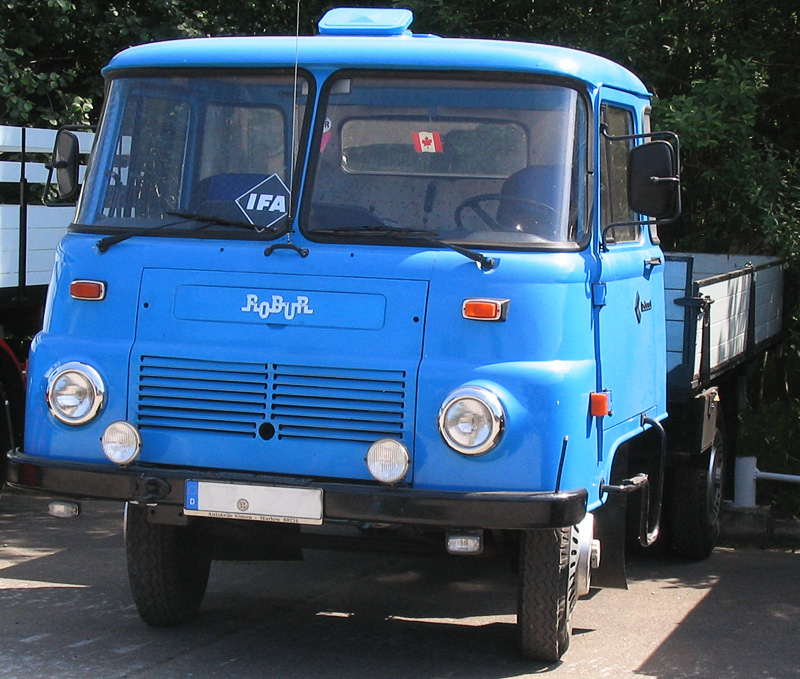
Robur Typ LO 2002

Robur was a marque of the Volkseigener Betrieb VEB Robur-Werke Zittau of East Germany (GDR). It mainly produced 3-ton trucks. The vehicles were mainly produced in the town of Zittau in what is now South-East Saxony. Until 1946, company produced under the marque Phänomen (English: Phenomenon), and until 1957 under the name VEB Phänomen Zittau.

== History ==
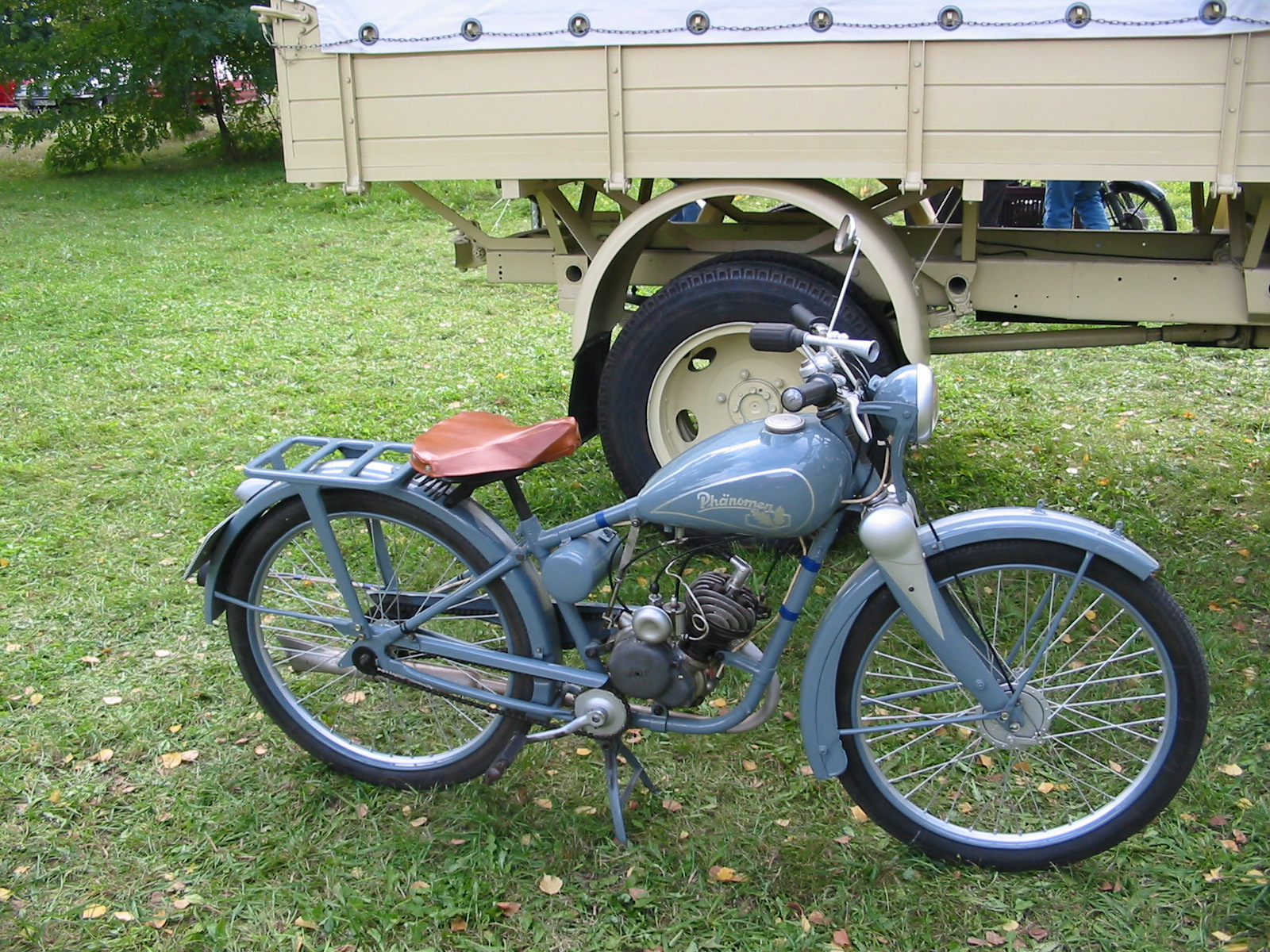
Phänomen Bob 98 cc motorcycle

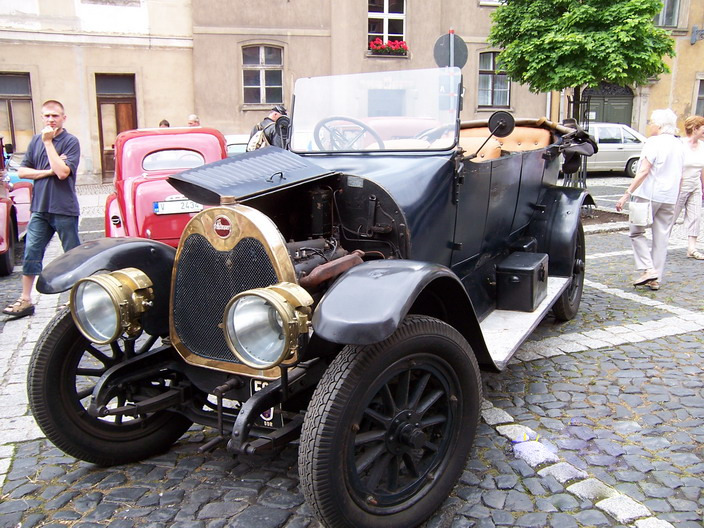
Phänomen 10/30 (1916)

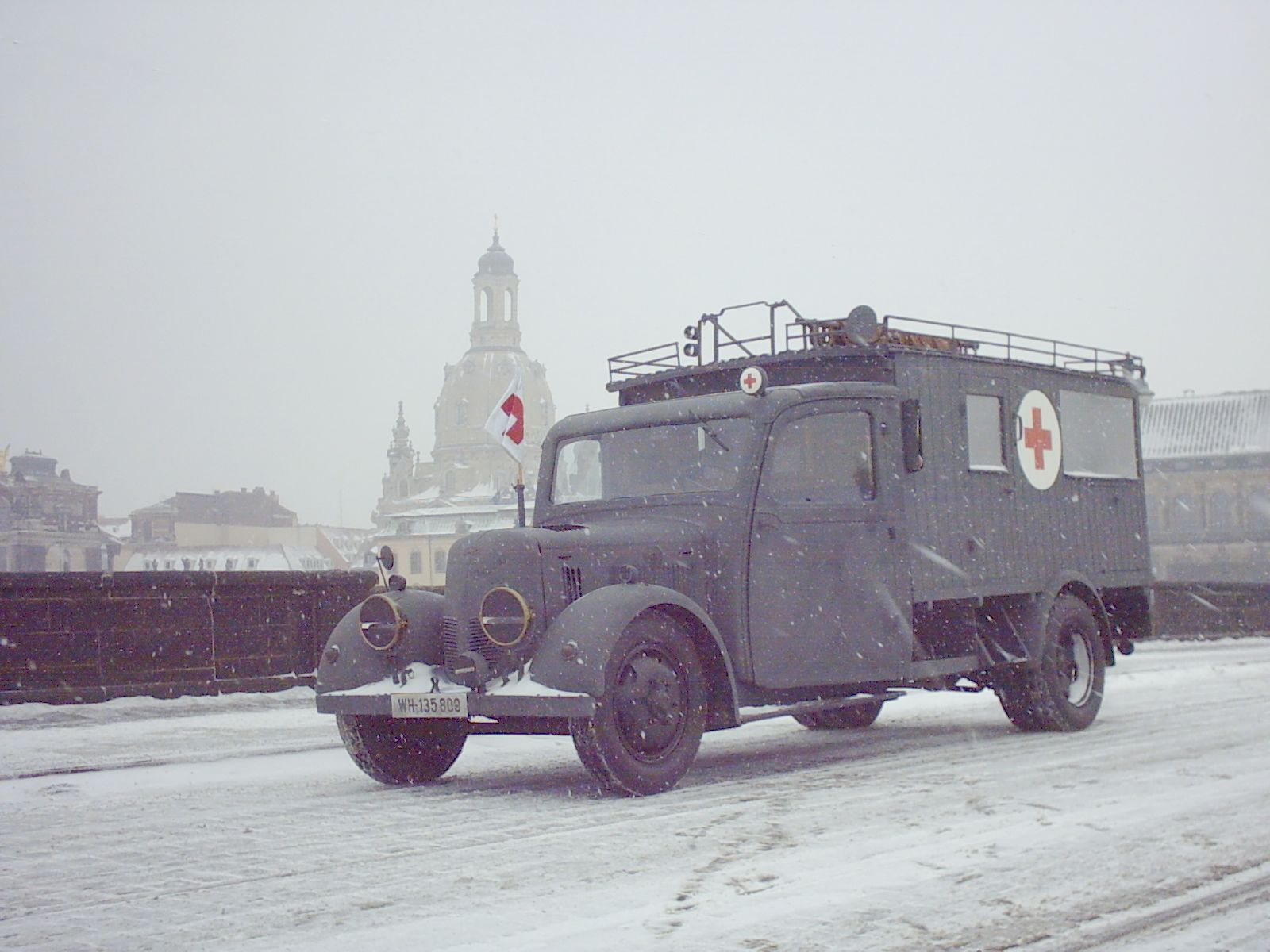
Phänomen Granit 30 in front of the Dresden Frauenkirche (January 2006)

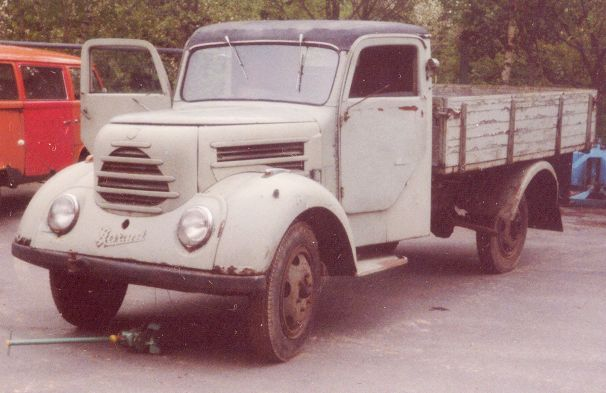
Garant 32 Diesel (1956)

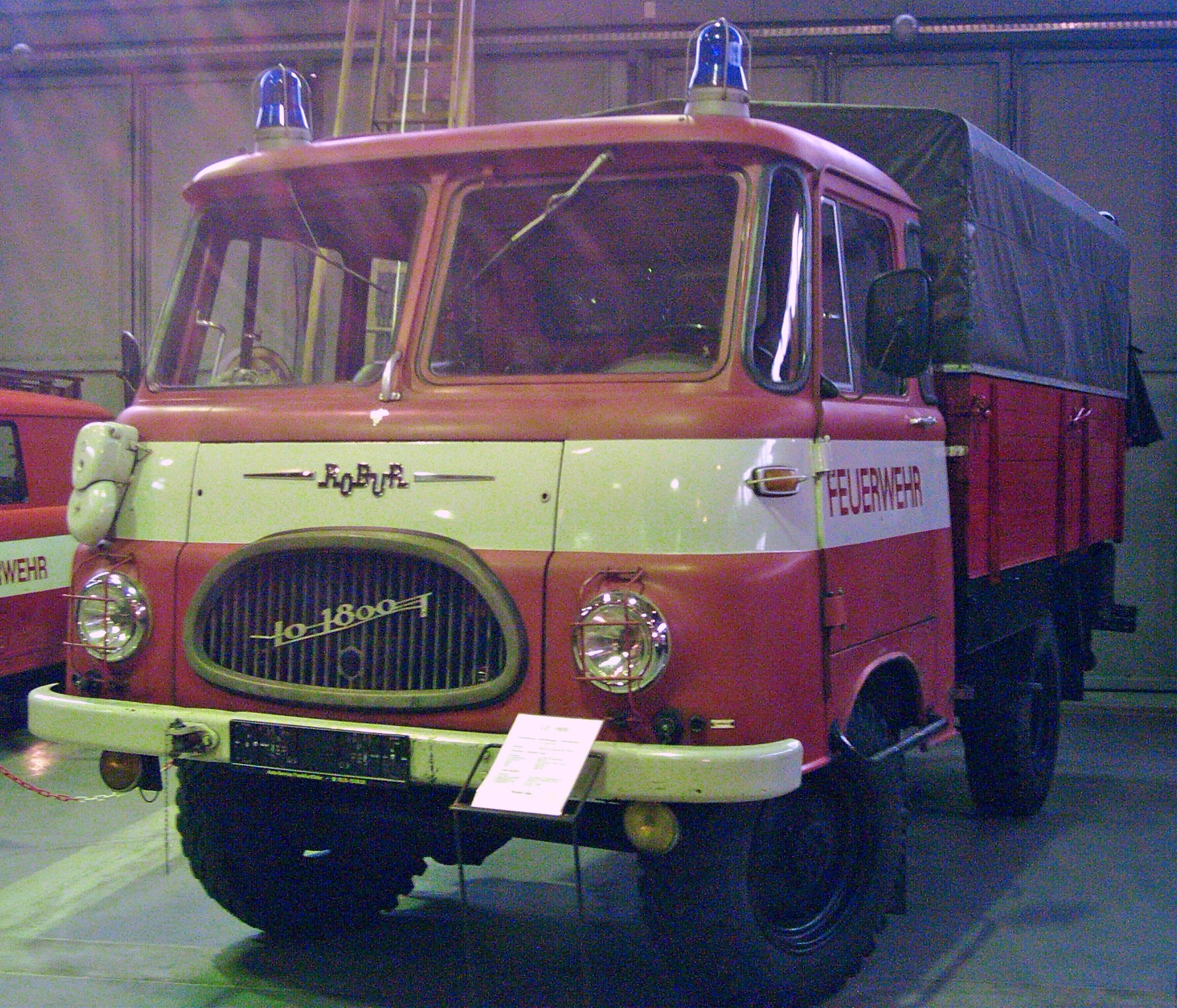
Modell LO 1800 A

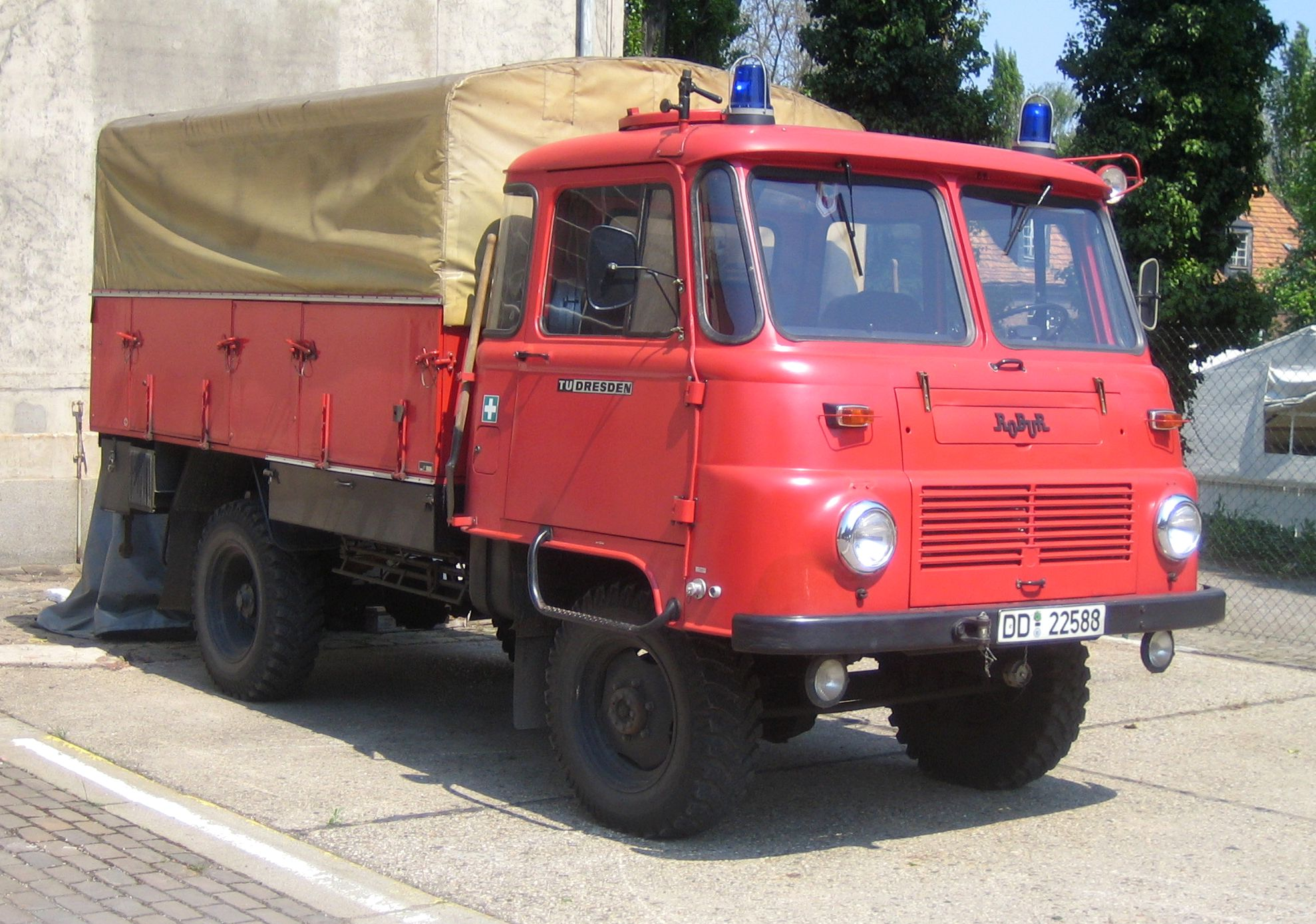
Robur LO 2002 A Fire Engine

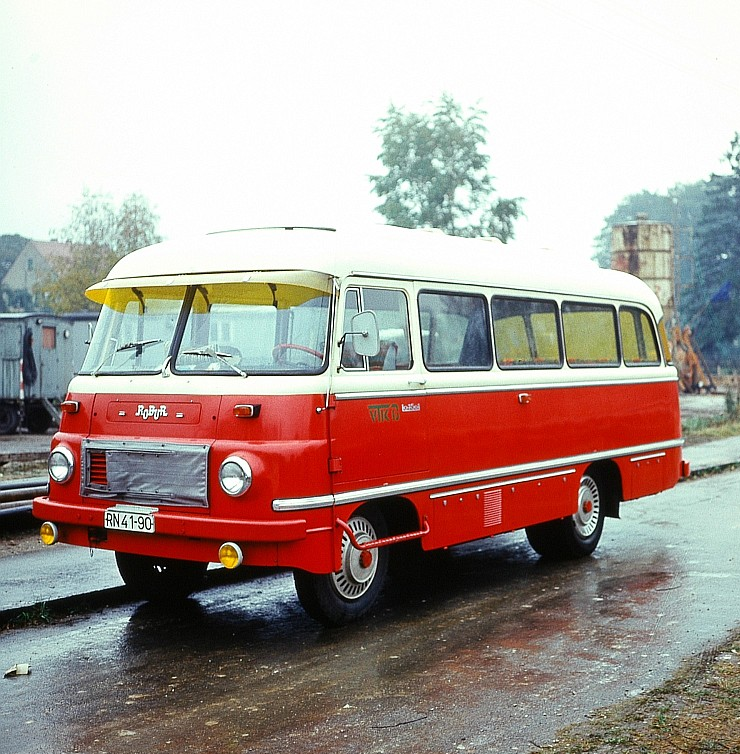
Coach

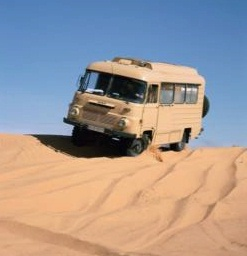
Four-wheel driven model MZ

In 1888, Karl Gustav Hiller founded a company for the distribution of a pom-pon machine that he had invented and would receive a patent for in 1894. On a trip to England he obtained an exclusive license to import and build Rover Safety Bicycles. He became shareholder and later owner of the Zittau machine factory "Müller & Preußger", refined the Rover bicycles and began to distribute them under the name "Phänomen-Rover" in 1894. In 1900 the company began to produce Phänomen motorcycles. At first the motorcycles were fitted with Fafnir engines, but from 1903 onwards single-cylinder four-stroke engines of Phänomen design were used. This change of engine necessitated a strengthening of the bike frame and a change of wheels. 26-inch wheels with 2 1/4-inch tires were now used. Permanent improvements led to the development of a two-cylinder engine.

In 1905 the company began the mass production of its three-wheeled Phänomobil. The two-cylinder engine used in motorbikes was used here as well. However, similarities in construction with Berlin-made three-wheeler Cyklonette of Cyklon, led to arguments over patent. Later, a twin-fan-cooled four-cylinder four-stroke engine was used in the vehicles from 1910, production running until 1927. Between 1912 and 1927 the company, by now known as "Aktiengesellschaft Phänomen-Werke Gustav Hiller", offered four-wheeled cars that unfortunately did not succeed in establishing themselves in the market. The coachwork was done by the "Karosseriewerk August Nowack AG" in Bautzen.

By request of the Reichspost for a cheap, safe and capable vehicle, the company introduced its 4 RL truck that could carry loads between 0.75 and 1 tons. The basis for this model was the four-cylinder engine used in the Phänomobil. As demand for higher payloads increased, the company brought the Granit 25 (1.5 tons) and Granit 30 (2.5 tons) trucks into production in 1931 and 1936, respectively. With the increasing arms production in Nazi Germany the product portfolio was reduced to the Granit 1500 model (called Granit 27 after the war) with a payload of 1.5 tons.

All Phänomen trucks and tricycles had air-cooled engines, only the four-wheeled passenger cars were equipped with water-cooled engines. In 1930, the company took up production of light motorcycles, using Sachs engines. Until 1945 Phänomen produced 14 different models.

In consequence of a referendum of 30 April 1946 in Saxony, all property of those judged to be Nazis and war criminals was expropriated. In line with this, the Phänomen works became Volkseigener Betrieb. Aside from the production of desperately needed commodities, some 1000 vehicles of the Red Army were repaired. In 1949 the mass production of the pre-war models was resumed on a low scale. Only in January 1950 were the first 13 Granit 27 finished. In the next year the payload of the model was increased to 2 tons. 1952 the company presented the Phänomen-Granit 32 prototype that was equipped with an air-cooled diesel engine - in contrast to the carburetor engines used until then. The mass production of the diesel engine began in 1954. In the meantime, the new Granit 30k model debuted, with an upgraded version of the carburetor engine used in the Granit 27 model which produced 60 horsepower (45 kW).

Later, the Garant model introduced with new design and chassis. This model’s production was around 50,000 pieces built in several variations (bus, truck, ambulance) until 1961. Aside from the Garant K 30 model with a petrol engine the Garant 32 with a diesel engine was also available.

In the beginning of 1957 Hiller’s heirs took control of the company, and after deciding that the name it had did not seem profitable, they decided to name the company VEB Robur Werke Zittau. The name Robur stems from the Latin name of the pedunculate oak, Quercus robur. The logo design was inspired by a crankshaft. Several other factories were merged with the company, among others the auto body works in Bautzen and Zittau, an engine plant in Kamenz and the fire-extinguisher works in Görlitz. The very successful Garant model was replaced by the Robur LO 2500. It was first presented at the Leipzig Trade Fair in 1961 and was constructed according to international development trends of the time. This modern COE truck had the carburetor engine of its predecessor, with an increased output of 70 HP. It had a payload of 2.5 tons. The four-wheel driven variation with a 1.8 ton payload was called Robur LO 1800 A.

Further development resulted in 1968 in the LO 2501 and LO 1801 A models, distinguishable by a changed grille. Several further improvements were made over the years, before the 3-ton truck LO 3000 was introduced in 1974. It became the basis for a number of special models. The four-wheel variant also saw its payload increased and was sold under the designation LO 2002A. From the fall of 1982 a diesel engine was offered alongside the carburetor engine Type 4 KVD 12,5 SRL. Development of the LD/LO 3000 series in the 1980s aimed to extend the lifetime of the various components and reaching international level in terms of quality. These changes, that were in part also made to the AWD types LD/LO 2202 A, led to the diesel-driven models LD 3001 and LD 3002, recognizable by smaller wheels and increased tread. The carburetor-engined LO variants lost import.

Robur trucks were not only deployed in the COMECON area, but in several overseas countries. In order to open up new markets the Robur-Safari program was created. In this, trucks would be adapted to the climactic and geographic conditions of their future country of deployment.

The production of the newly developed O 611/O 611A and D 609 models was not approved by the government and development was restricted to existing models.

After German reunification the company quickly folded. Deployment of Deutz diesel engines did nothing to save it and production was cancelled in 1991. In 1995 a new company called Robur-Fahrzeug-Engineering GmbH was founded and bought all know-how of the Robur-Werke Zittau. In 1999 another successor was founded, FBZ GmbH Zittau. The company builds and supplies components for vehicles.

== Models ==
=== Passenger cars 1907–1927 ===
Type	Built	No of cylinders	Displacement	Power	Maximum speed
Phänomobil 4/6 PS	1907–1912	V-2	887 cc	6–9 HP (4.4–6.6 kW)	50 km/h
10/28 PS	1912–1919	I-4	2597 cc	28 PS (20.5 kW)	80 km/h
Phänomobil 6/12 PS	1912–1920	I-4	1548 cc	12 HP (8.8 kW)	60 km/h
10/30 PS	1920–1924	I-4	2612 cc	30 HP (22 kW)	65 km/h
16/45 PS	1920–1924	I-4	4219 cc	45 HP (33 kW)	75 km/h
Phänomobil Typ V (6/12 PS)	1920–1927	I-4	1548 cc	12 HP (8.8 kW)	55 km/h
Typ 412 (12/50 PS)	1924–1927	I-4	3132 cc	50 HP (37 kW)	100 km/h

=== Trucks 1927–1991 ===
Most vehicles were equipped with a petrol engine. The type designation LO (Luftgekühlter Ottomotor, German for air-cooled petrol engine) led to the nickname Ello which became the popular designation for all Robur trucks, as it is impossible to differentiate between the diesel and petrol engines from the outside.

The vehicles were modified for a number of different purposes, e.g. a mobile pharmacy, fire engines and dumpers. Generally speaking, the following models existed.

==== All-wheel drive vehicles ====
- LO 1800A/1801A (air-cooled petrol engine, the A is for "Allrad", the German term for all-wheel drive)
- LO 2002 (air-cooled petrol engine, 2 ton payload)
- LD 2002 (air-cooled diesel engine, 2 ton payload)
- LD 2202 (air-cooled diesel engine, 2.4 ton payload)
- Safari models, modified for export
- vehicles with closed body, multi-purpose

==== Rear-wheel drive vehicles ====
- Bus - B21 Type LD 3001 FR M2/B21
- Refrigerator truck
- Light panel van
- Pick up
- Multi-purpose Type LO 3002 Fr M5/MZ 11
