= Tine van Berken =

Dutch children's writer

Anna Christina Witmond-Berkhout (1870 – 1899) was a Dutch children's writer, best known under her pseudonym Tine van Berken. She also wrote adult books under the name Anna Koubert.

== Life ==
Tine van Berken was born on September 29, 1870, in Amsterdam. Between 1894 and 1899, she wrote a large number of books for girls.

In 1899, she founded the journal Lente: Weekblad voor jonge dames [Spring: Young Ladies' Weekly Magazine]. She corresponded with Top Naeff about placing an article in Spring, and read Naeff's novel Schoolidyllen [School Idylls]. However, she died from tuberculosis on December 7, 1899.

The Flemish magic realist writer Johan Daisne wrote a biography of her, Tine van Berken of de intelligentie der ziel [Tine van Berken, or the intelligence of the soul] (1962).

== Works ==
As Tine van Berken

- Een klaverblad van vier [A four-leaf clover], 1894
- De familie Berewoud [The Berewoud family], 1895
- Hans en Hanna [Hans and Hanna], 1896
- Meidorens: drie verhalen, 1896
- Mijn zusters en ik [My sisters and I], 1896
- (tr.) Mooie Bruno, 1896. Translated from the English Beautiful Joe by Margaret Marshall Saunders.
- Wilde wingerd: drie verhalen [Virginia creeper: three stories], 1896
- De dochters van den generaal [The daughters of the general], 1897
- Driftkopje: een verhaal, 1897
- Kleine menschen: drie verhalen [Little people: three stories], 1897
- Op kostschool en thuis [At boarding school and at home], 1897
- Rietje's pop [Rietje's doll], 1897
- Heintje Pochhans, 1898
- Kibbelaarstertje, 1898
- Lachebekje: een verhaal, 1898
- Regen en zonneschijn: drie verhalen [Rain and sunshine: three stories], 1898
- Kruidje-roer-me-niet, 1899
- De berewoudjes [The mountain forests], 1900
- Van een grootmoeder en zeven kleinkinderen [From a grandmother and seven grandchildren], 1900
- Robbedoes, 1905
- Rudi Willenborg, 1909
- Hedwigs St. Nicolaasfeest [Hedwig's Saint Nicholas feast], 1914
- Ons zonnetje: een verhaal [Our sunshine: a story], 1915

As Anna Koubert

- Nieuwe paneeltjes [New panels], Amsterdam, 1894
- Een scheepje zonder roer [A boat without a rudder], Amsterdam, 1895
- Confetti, Amsterdam, 1898
- Moeder Wassink [Mother Wassink], Amsterdam, 1900
