= Robur LO 1801 A =

LO 1801 A
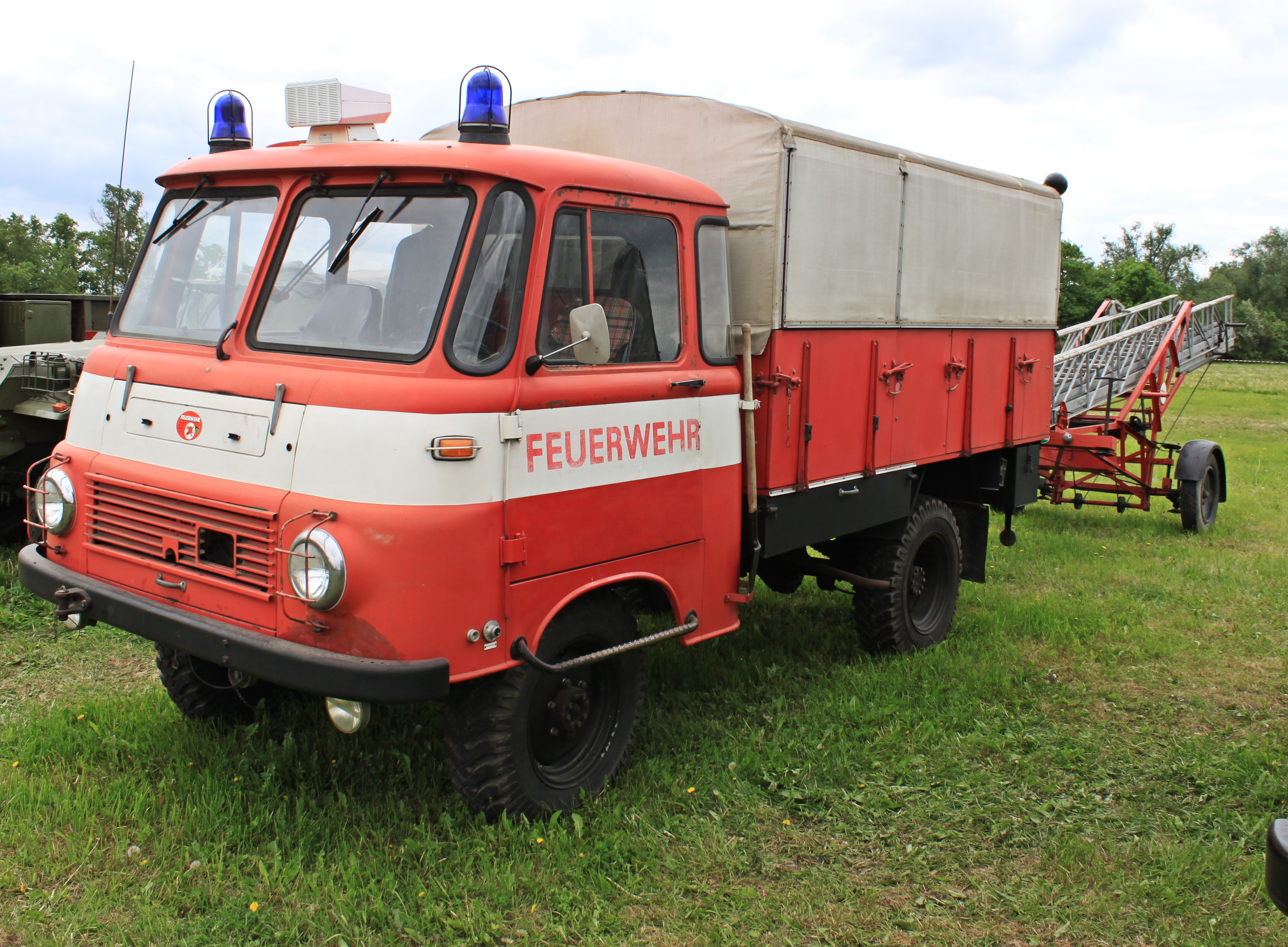
- LO 1801 A fire engine

Overview
- Type: Truck
- Manufacturer: VEB Robur-Werke Zittau
- Production: 1965–1973
- Assembly: East Germany: Zittau

Body and chassis
- Class: 1.8 t truck
- Body style: Forward control truck
- Layout: Front engine, all-wheel-drive
- Platform: Robur
- Related: LO 2501 / LD 2501

Powertrain
- Engine: LO 4/1 (Otto, 3345 cm^{3}, 51.5 kW)
- Transmission: Manual five-speed synchromesh gearbox and two-speed splitter gearbox; 10 forward, 2 reverse gears
- Propulsion: Tyres

Dimensions
- Wheelbase: 3025 mm
- Length: 5350 mm
- Width: 2370 mm
- Height: 2530 mm
- Kerb weight: 3200 kg

Chronology
- Predecessor: Robur LO 1800 A
- Successor: Robur LO 2002 A

The Robur LO 1801 A is a forward control off-road truck, made by East German manufacturer VEB Robur-Werke Zittau. It was produced from 1965 to 1973, alongside the on-road model LO 2501. Unlike the on-road model, the LO 1801 A has all-wheel drive, which came at the cost of a reduced payload. LO 1801 A is an abbreviation for air-cooled otto, 1800 kg payload, all-wheel drive.

Like its predecessors, the LO 1801 A was used by the East German military, police, fire brigade, and open pit mining rescue service. Export versions were called Safari.

== Technical description ==
The LO 1801 A is a light, 1.8 tonne, two-axle, all-wheel-drive, body-on-frame, forward control truck with single tyres.

The frame has two U-section longitudinal members, and four tube, and two square-shaped crossmembers. It comes with only few grease nipples. Both front and rear axles are leaf sprung rigid live axles, only the front axle has hydraulic shock absorbers. Differentials with a reduction of 6:35 were installed. The steering system is a worm-and-lever steering system. All four wheels come with 9.00—20 inch rims, 10—20 inch extra tyres, and drum brakes. Robur installed a dual-circuit braking system. The cab is made of steel, has front-hinged doors, a split windscreen, and split A-pillars with narrow windows for improved visibility. Unlike the LO 2501, which only seats three, the Robur LO 1801 A seats four.

The gearbox is a manual, five-speed, dog-leg gearbox with synchromesh and helical gearing in gears 2–5. First and reverse are straight cut gears without synchromesh. The transfer box is an unsynchronised, three-shaft gearbox with gearshift sleeves. It has an on-road gear, an off-road gear, and an additional gear for switching front-wheel drive. A dry diaphragm-spring single-disc clutch, type T20K/DZ, transmits the torque from the engine to the gearbox. The LO 1801 A is powered by an air-cooled, straight-four, OHV, carburetted LO 4/1 otto engine. It displaces 3.3 litres, and is rated 70 PS (51.5 kW).

== Technical specifications ==
Technical specifications
	Robur LO 1801 A
Engine
Engine type	LO 4/1; 4 VO 11,8/9,5-1 SRL
Operating principle and layout	Straight-four, air-cooled, four-stroke, OHV otto engine with downdraught carburetter and battery ignition system
Bore × Stroke, Displacement	95 × 118 mm, 3345 cm^{3}
Rated power (TGL 8346)	70 PS (51.5 kW) at 2800 min^{−1}
Max. torque	22 kp⋅m (215.7 N⋅m) at 1800 min^{−1}
Fuel type	VK 79 (leaded petrol, 79 RON)
Specific fuel consumption	250 g/PSh (340 g/kWh)
Source, unless otherwise stated	
Powertrain
Layout	Front engine, all-wheel drive
Differential locks	No differential locks; engaging front wheel drive automatically locks front and rear axle (due to lack of a centre differential)
Tyres	4× 10—20″ extra single tyres
Clutch	T20K/DZ single-disc dry clutch
Gearbox	Five-speed + two-speed splitter
PTO	Available as a factory option
Measurements
Length	5350 mm
Width	2370 mm
Height	2530 mm
Wheelbase	3025 mm
Track width	front: 1636 mm rear: 1664 mm
Overhang	front: 1200 mm rear: 1165 mm
Turning circle	14,900 mm
Ground clearance	265 mm
Fording depth	800 mm
Slope angle	front: 36 ° rear: 35 °
Mass	3200 kg
Payload	1800 kg
GVW	5000 kg
Fuel tank	90+35 L
Fuel consumption	26 L/100 km (fully laden)
Source, unless otherwise stated	
Electrical system
Generator	DC generator, 41.7 A, 12 V, 0.5 kW
Battery	1 × Lead-acid battery, 12 V, 105 Ah
Starter	12 V, 1.3 kW

Speed ranges and gradeability
Gear	Speed at 2800/min (on-road gear)	Speed at 2800/min (off-road gear)	Gradeability at 1700/min (off-road gear)
1st	10 km/h	6 km/h	82 %
2nd	17 km/h	9 km/h	40 %
3rd	27 km/h	15 km/h	23 %
4th	48 km/h	26 km/h	13 %
5th	80 km/h	45 km/h	8 %
Source			
