= Liberian snap handshake =

Liberian greeting gesture

In Liberia, the snap handshake or finger snap is a gesture of greeting, in which two people shake hands in the conventional Western way, but end the handshake with a mutual press of the fingers that creates a "snap" sound, similar to the sound made by a clap.

Apocryphally, the custom is attributed to the Americo-Liberian population of freed slaves, who created the gesture to contrast with slave owners' practice of breaking slaves' fingers. The snap handshake now exists in certain Western cultures, though it is much less common than in Liberia. It is also sometimes associated with dap greetings, but is much less common in these than the conventional fist bump or handshake.

During the 2014–16 Ebola epidemic, handshaking in Liberia was curtailed, leading a BBC commentator to note that avoidance of handshaking was detrimental to the established custom of the Liberian handshake. During this period, the elbow bump was used as a substitute and nicknamed the "Ebola handshake".
