= Galpin =

Galpin may refer to:

- Galpin Auto Sports, automobile manufacturer.
- Galpin Lake, a lake in Minnesota, United States
- Galpin Society, a music organization

== People with the surname Galpin ==
- Alastair Galpin, South African record holder
- Alfred Galpin, American composer
- Barbara Galpin (1855–1922), American journalist
- Ernest Edward Galpin, South African botanist and banker
- Francis William Galpin (1858–1945), English cleric and musicologist
- Homer Galpin (1871–1941), American lawyer and politician
- John Galpin (1843–1917), English cricketer
- Max Galpin (born 1935), Australian rules footballer
- Shannon Galpin, American trainer
- Ted Galpin, British newspaper editor

=== Fictional characters ===
- Tyler Galpin and his parents, Donovan and the late Francoise Galpin in Wednesday.
