= Pound hug =

Type of greeting

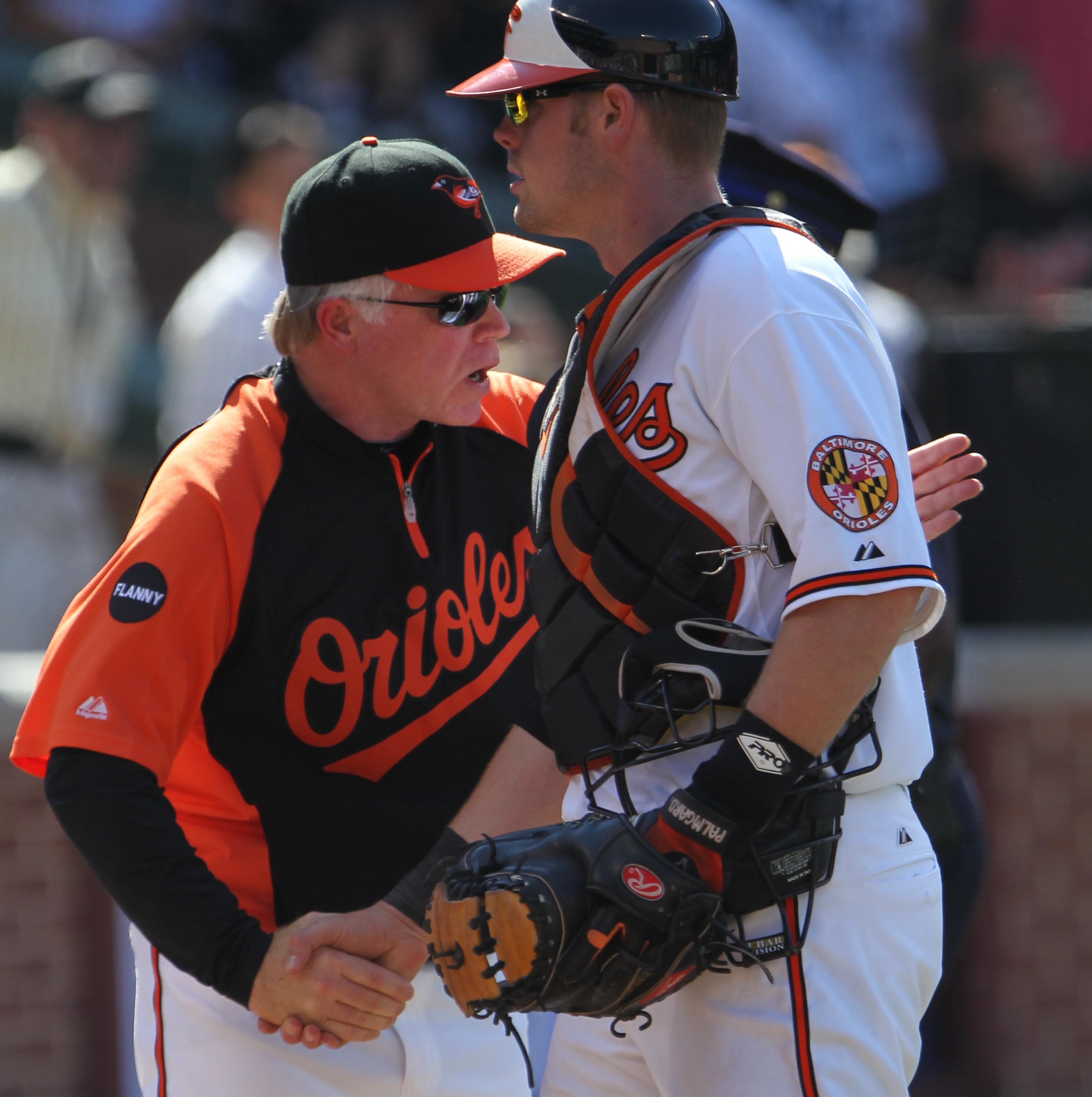
Buck Showalter (left) engages Matt Wieters in a pound hug.

The pound hug (also referred to as a pound shake, hip-hop hug, one-armed hug, dude hug, cootie hug, homie hug, shug, bro-grab, bro hug, brah hug, thug hug, man-hug, or a daps) is a stylized greeting, exclusively performed between two people, that consists of a combination of a handshake and one-armed hug. Unlike the traditional hug, which symbolically and effectively removes interpersonal barriers and unites the two persons embracing, the pound hug—performed by keeping the right hand locked in handshake while the left arm wraps around the other's shoulder—interposes the obstacle of the two right arms to the joining of the two bodies.

== Origin ==
The pound hug evolved from the dap, a type of handshake created by African-American soldiers serving in the Vietnam War. Due to the high racial tensions in the United States during this time, black soldiers were frequent victims of racist violence and systemic discrimination in the military. The dap became a gesture of unity and solidarity between black veterans, with its movements symbolizing "I'm not above you, you're not above me, we're side by side, we're together". From these veterans, the dap dispersed into hip hop culture and eventually popular culture, retaining its conveyed sense of camaraderie.
