= Disability in Brazil =

Disability in Brazil is defined when individuals struggle or are unable to complete standard everyday tasks. This is measured by the health indicators of daily activities and physical movement. Defining disability differs according to legal contexts of different environments and levels of vulnerability. Brazil is one of the heaviest populated countries in the world and is the largest country in South America, with a population of 212.56 million people in 2020. Due to population rates, there is approximately 16 million people in Brazil with a disability. Of this, 9 million of these are of working age, and 1 million are in the labor force.

In Brazil, disability is measured by facts and age-based data, sport participation, education information, impacts on everyday life and available support services/issues of access.

The Brazilian flag

== Facts ==
=== Statistics ===
Types of disabilities and their symbols

There are many types of disabilities in Brazil. Disability can occur physically, through head injuries, vision impairments, hearing impairments, cognitively, learning manners, psychologically or invisibly. In Brazil, approximately 34% of adults are impacted by disabilities that affect functional living patterns. Men represent higher statistics over women by 1.3%. Strokes and mental disorders are common in Brazil and can lead to individuals attaining a disability. Each individual experiences disability differently, whereby some are static, others are progressive and seriousness levels vary. In Brazil, individuals who maintain a low education and aged persons are more vulnerable to disabilities, therefore attaining incapacities at higher rates. Having a high education enforces health advantages through the promotion of health material and current health data, allowing for individuals to live a healthy lifestyle and seek medical assistance when necessary Encountering a functional disability as a Brazilian adult is common although it disadvantages individuals as many do not attend education institutions, are not likely to complete an educational course and may lack literacy abilities.

=== Age groups ===
The chance of attaining a disability in Brazil grows as an individual gets older. Developing a disability can occur through old age, as vulnerability appears and the risk of getting sick or receiving a chronic disease is high. The risk increases once individuals reach age 40, and visual disabilities are most common. Throughout a lifespan, if individuals are exposed to poverty or unhealthy conditions, developing a disability can occur earlier.

== Sport ==
=== Participation ===
In Brazil, individuals of any gender who encounter differing levels of disabilities are able to participate in sport. Sports available for people with disabilities include dance, swimming, tennis, bike riding, horse riding, water sports, basketball, contact sports and a variety of athletic activities. The late 20th century has brought sporting changes in Brazil which have enabled people with disabilities to feel included, as they are able to form individuality through participating in the Paralympics and other sporting groups. An example of this is through Brazilian dance practices, where individuals can participate in choreography and are able to use their disability as a stance of creativity.

=== Potential barriers ===
Individuals with disabilities in Brazil face barriers when anticipating participation in sport. Brazilian individuals with disabilities face varying levels of societal pressure, as they must prove their sporting activity is possible. Individuals with disabilities may encounter a low self-esteem when participating in sporting events, through the belief that participation entirety is not possible. There are limited sporting amenities for Brazilian people with disabilities, which can create individual pressure. Differing sports conducted by Brazilian individuals with disabilities are frowned upon, and many athletes face notoriety for their sporting movements. There is a lack of accessibility within Brazilian city structures, which forms difficulties in accessing sporting activities.

=== Overcoming barriers ===
The Rio de Janeiro 2016 Paralympics logo

There are ways for individuals with disabilities in Brazil to overcome sport barriers. An example of this is holding internal strength while participating in sport, which enables a voice and creates possibilities. At least five major associations work to enable the participation of Brazilians with disabilities in sport. There are organisations in Brazil that aim to enable every sport for individuals with disabilities, including the 'Brazilian Sporting Association for Amputees' and 'Brazilian Wheelchair Sporting Association'. 'Sport for All' is an Olympic created initiative that was brought into Brazil to make sport easily accessible to all individuals. The 2016 Paralympics were held in Rio de Janeiro and encouraged government movements for individuals with disabilities in sports, including the introduction of more sport facilities, sport encouragement and mobility ease within communities. Local governments in Brazil are assisting individuals with disabilities to recognise potential levels and encourage activity, due to Brazil being a party to the United Nations Convention on the Rights of Persons with Disabilities, having signed the treaty on 30 March 2007 and ratified it on 1 August 2008. Brazil's Law 7853 criminalizes discrimination based on disability, and other legal protections also exist.

== Education ==
=== History ===
In Brazil, attending an education institution is a human right. Students with disabilities are challenged when seeking education access. This is because of Brazil's past of the rejection of foreign information and knowledge because of language blockages and location.

In 1600s Brazil, special education was recognised through a school for children with physical disabilities, and in the 1800s, the first school for children who were deaf was created. In 1800s Brazil, there was no other record of official caring for people with disabilities. Catholic organisations cared for individuals with learning disabilities as they were abandoned. An inclusion policy for children with disabilities in Brazil was implemented in 1989 to seek social inclusion and enhance wellbeing in schools. Educators and government officials did not advocate for children with disabilities seeking education, parents, friends, and psychologists did.

=== Potential barriers ===
Individuals with disabilities are challenged when seeking education in Brazil, as they do not receive education assistance. Students with disabilities receive no special considerations in the classroom. In Brazil, there are two education systems, one for students with special needs and one for students without special needs. Education classes held for students with disabilities are provided in Portuguese only, and academic learning faces difficulties, as no grading takes place. Testing students with disabilities in classrooms does not occur, a group will determine skills and improvement. Teachers lack disability training which decreases education quality. Low government funding for the education of individuals with disabilities has led to low quality institutions. Remote and rural areas lack facilities for students with disabilities.

=== Overcoming barriers ===
Education barriers are being overcome as Brazil is developing and forming a major economy. Brazilian law states that children with disabilities have the right to be integrated into education institutions. Local, regional, and national parents and psychologists have negotiated with Brazilian officials for the complete integration of their children with disabilities into education systems. An example of this is the 'Association of Parents and Friends of the Exceptional' which fundraise money for individuals with learning disabilities on a non-profit basis to assist with health and integration into education systems. Advocacy and support has led people with disabilities to form their own communities and promote their own rights. The Brazilian adoption of the UN Convention on the Rights of Persons with Disabilities in 2008, and the instigation of the Statute of the Rights of Persons with Disabilities in 2015, enabled legality for people with disabilities in education. Private schools in Brazil have recognised students with disabilities and their need for individual facilities, integrating this into physical and psychological learning environments. Through non-profit funding, schools of students with disabilities have adopted a general curriculum.

== Everyday life impacts ==
=== Life normality ===
Physical disability symbol

People with disabilities in Brazil have a different lifestyle compared to those without a disability, where lifestyles can be disrupted on a daily basis. Life normality for many Brazilian individuals with disabilities includes the encouragement of independence and self-sufficiency within the daily departments of housing and family, health, and communication. Many individuals who have a disability struggle with at least one daily activity, including dressing and transfers. Difficulty in everyday life activities is escalated by the factors of age, education, and chronic disease levels. Life normality and challenges for people with disabilities in Brazil originates from history and struggles with forced labour.

=== Housing and family ===
In Brazil, people with disabilities are socially impacted through where they live and who they live with, determining independence levels. Individuals with disabilities are likely to live with family, regardless of children or marriage, due to economic reasons and familial values of protection. In Brazil, care occurs informally by family and females. Families give up studying and working to provide free care.

=== Health ===
Health levels vary through the number of chronic diseases encountered and age, which impacts everyday life. Chronic diseases in individuals with disabilities grow with age. Individuals with disabilities in Brazil are prone to illness and chronic diseases, and frequently require professional health assistance. There are issues of access when seeking professional health assistance for people with disabilities, through service location, finances and service opening times. Persons with physical disabilities have higher difficulty levels of seeking health assistance due to physical environments and transportation.

=== Learning and communicating ===
Learning and communicating varies in everyday life, due to education sections of Brazilian legislation. Higher educated individuals have lower levels of difficulty communicating in daily life and participating in daily activities. Schools and education services can lack the recognition of disability types and social inclusion. Legal support in legislation lacks for individuals with communication disorders, lowering social inclusion rates.

== Support services and access issues ==
=== Support services ===
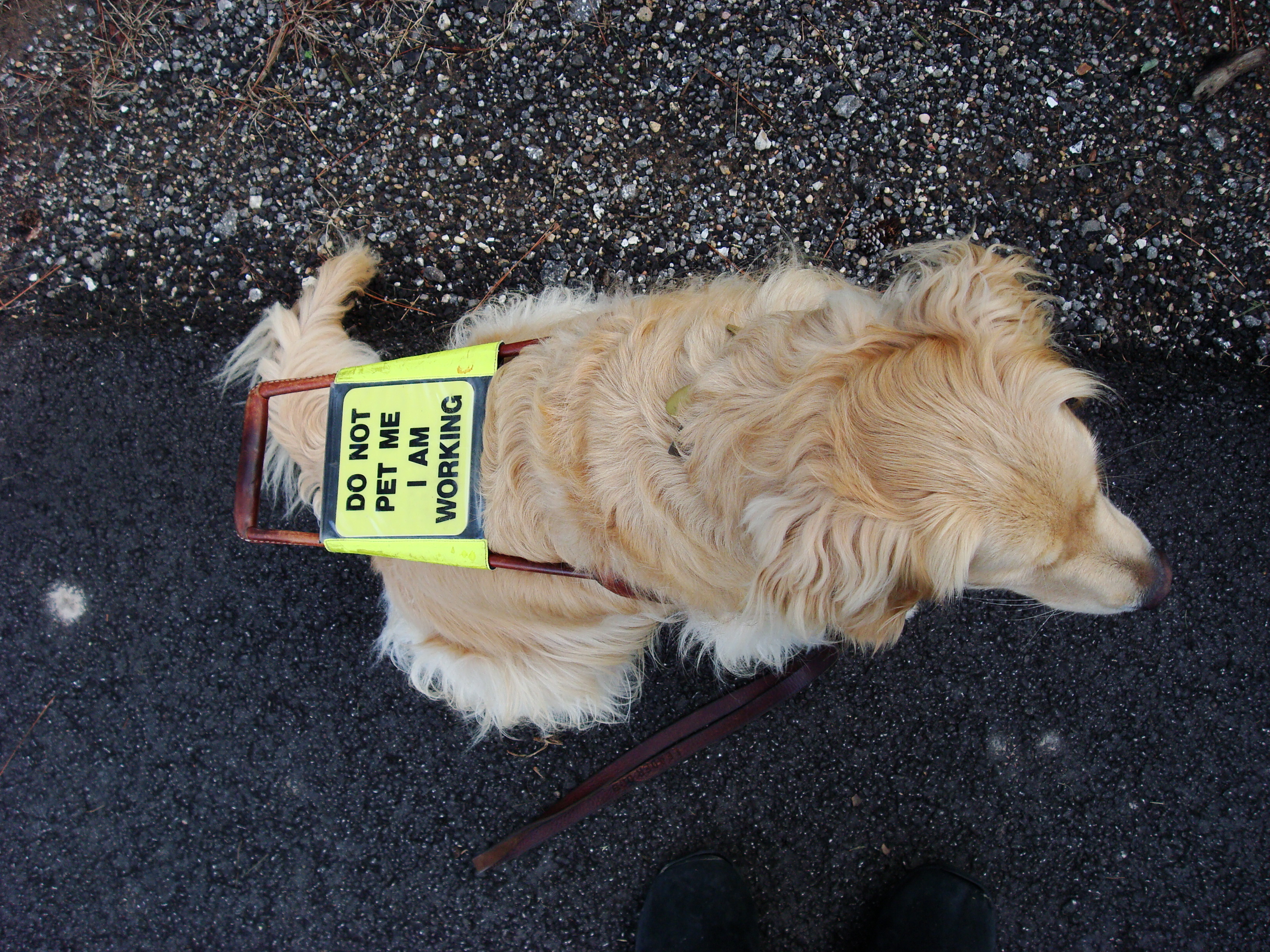
Guide dog to assist individuals with visual impairments

Braille for individuals with visual impairments

There are support services and organisations available for people with disabilities in Brazil, which aim to fulfil assistance lacking by the Brazilian government. There are non-government organisations who aim to advocate the rights of people with disabilities and educate individuals with disabilities of their rights in the country. This has encouraged individuals with disabilities to self-advocate and participate in social movements to promote democracy. There are civil and human rights organisations in Brazil who advocate for people with disabilities to create public concerns. In major cities, physical assistance is available for people with disabilities, such as provision of guide dogs, staff at train stations, and set seating in public transport. In São Paulo, building elevators have Braille buttons and resources for hearing incapacities. There is a transport service available for individuals with severe disabilities in São Paulo, to prevent difficulties on public transport.

=== Issues of access and success ===
Individuals with disabilities have issues utilising support services due to issues of access and success. A disability non-government organisation must form networks with other organisations to be heard by government officials. There are public policies to promote disability awareness, with economic plans taking priority over respect to individuals with disabilities. There are perceptions of individuals with disabilities in Brazil, limiting disability organisations success rate. In Brazil, physical support services lack. An example of this are the staff who aid public transport that do not receive specific training, access ramps lack sufficiency, and dedicated lanes on the road for sight disabilities are incomplete. Throughout the country, road crossings are silent and use visuals only.
