= Dexiosis =

Representation in fine arts

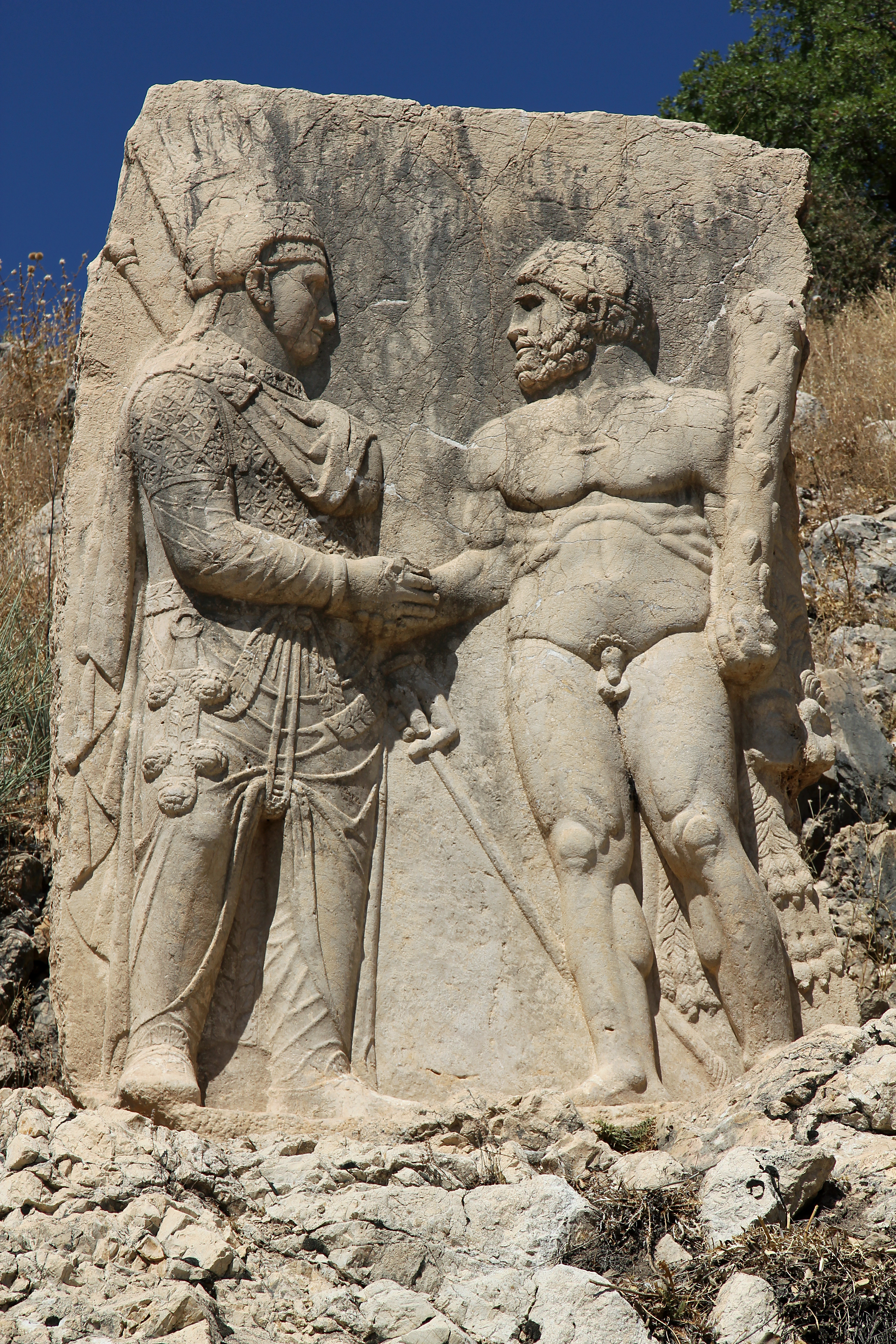
King Mithridates I Callinicus or Antiochus I of Commagene shaking hands with Hercules

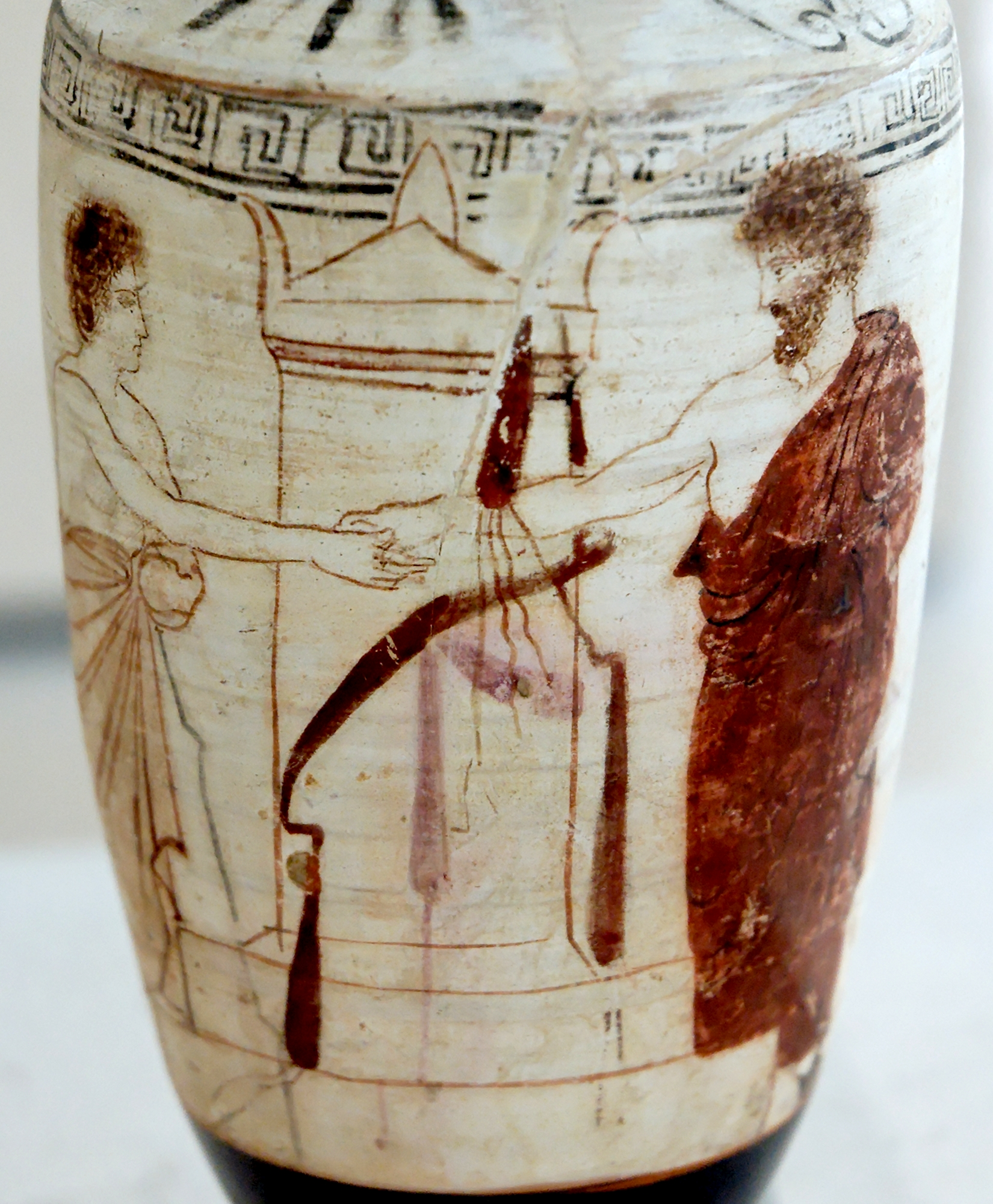
Dexiosis on Attic Lekythos 5th century BCE

Dexiosis (Greek: δεξίωσις dexiōsis, 'greeting' to δεξιόομαι dexioomai‚ 'to give (someone) the right (hand)' δεξιός, dexios 'right'; Latin: dextrarum iunctio‚ 'joining together of the right hands'), in the fine arts, is the representation of two people offering each other their right hand.

The dexiosis reliefs from Commagene are well known in which the then ruler is shown shaking hands with gods. Dexiosis reliefs are also known from Roman gravestones, which show the deceased with their spouses. Similarly, dexiosis reliefs are found on ancient coins and are they are intended to show bonds between two cities by shaking hands.

Portrayals of dexiosis are also known from much earlier times on vase paintings.

The noun dexiosis also denoted hospitality, and correspondingly the verb dexioutai (Δεξιοῦται), which takes an accusative object, came to mean "to greet", "to receive as a guest" or "to show kindness". The noun dexias (Δεξιάς), literally "handshakes", was used in the sense of "agreements", "to conclude agreements".
