= Richard C. Weaver =

Regular handshaker of US presidents

Richard C. Weaver is a Californian man known by the nickname Handshake Man. Weaver has earned notoriety for frequently bypassing the US Secret Service and shaking the hand of the United States President.

Weaver claims his handshakes are often used as a way of passing "notes from God" to the presidents.

According to his site, Weaver is a born-again Christian who is married to Donna Weaver and has two children, Cindy and David. He also believes that God has directly spoken to him and calls himself a "modern-day prophet". In late 2008, Weaver stated that he would not attempt to shake Barack Obama's hand due to an ongoing ban from Washington D.C. that had yet to expire.

== Pre 2001 ==
Richard C. Weaver claims to have shaken the hand of four US Presidents after Jimmy Carter. However, with little evidence of such events, it is unknown if these instances actually occurred. The only confirmed event was the 1997 inauguration of Bill Clinton where Weaver managed to shake Clinton's hand. Despite the incident having led the Secret Service to prepare for his return, Weaver was able to bypass security and meet the then recently inaugurated George W. Bush in 2001. (Weaver's website displays a picture of him meeting President George H. W. Bush.)

== 2001 Presidential Inauguration ==
On the January 20 inauguration event of 2001, Weaver was able to meet George W. Bush and hand him a coin after he had been sworn in as President. Weaver had a standing-room-only ticket that would only allow him access to the event. Despite having been shown tapes of a similar meeting between Weaver and former president Bill Clinton, the Secret Service were not able to catch him.

Although Ari Fleischer insisted that the president was in no danger, U.S. Capitol Police took the matter seriously as a breach of security.

== Post 2001 ==
On February 6, 2003 Weaver attended the National Prayer Breakfast meeting and was able to hand Bush an eight-page typed letter about Iraq "from God". At George W. Bush's second inauguration in 2005, Weaver was arrested on an outstanding warrant related to his prior presidential photo stunts.

On December 8, 2009, CNN's website discussed an unreleased Secret Service document used for training purposes which discusses various instances where individuals have bypassed the Secret Service and gained access to the president. This document credits Mr. Weaver with four instances of having gained access to a president.
