= Elbow bump =

Type of informal greeting

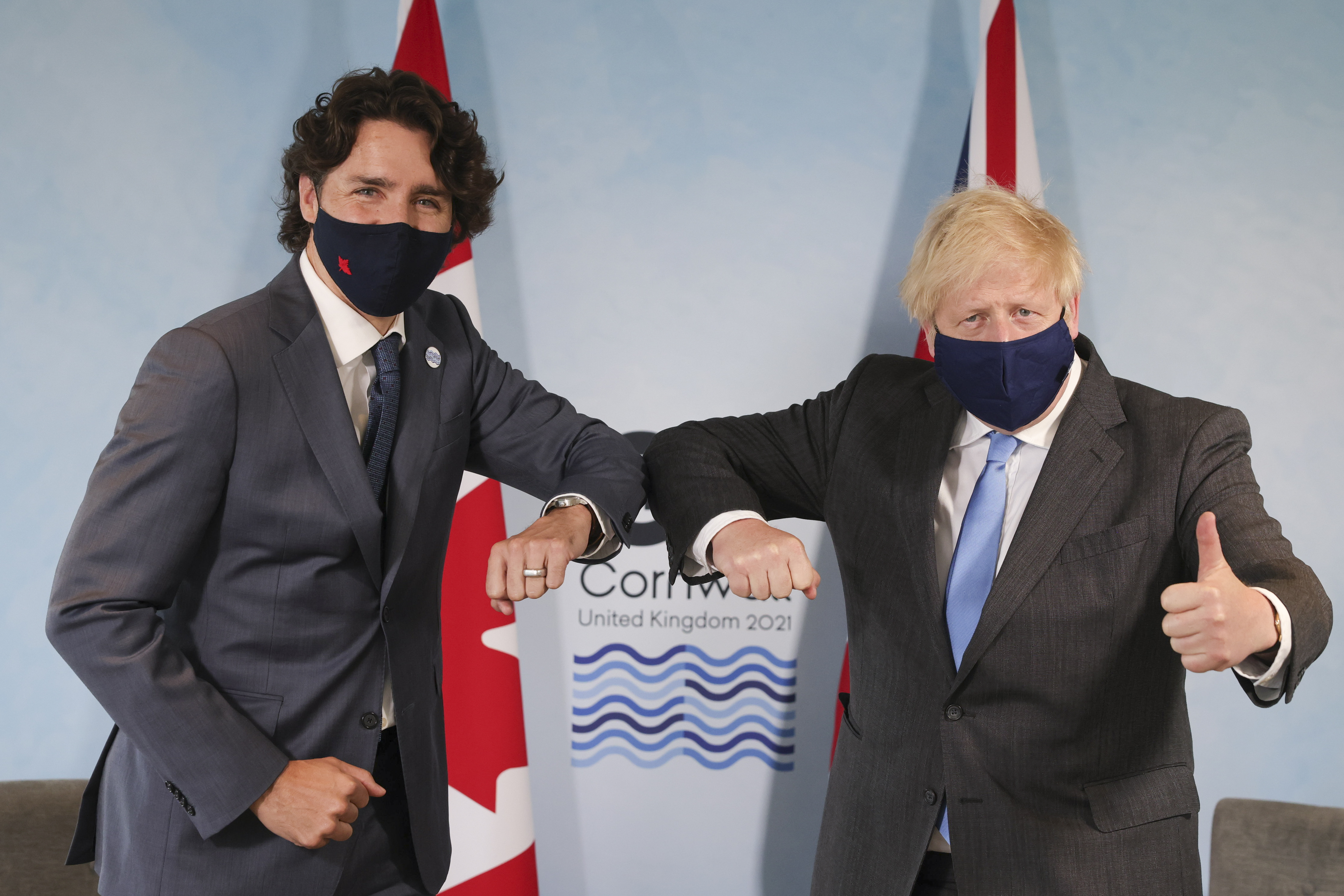
Justin Trudeau (left) and Boris Johnson (right), Canadian and British Prime Ministers respectively, performing an elbow bump at the 47th G7 summit in 2021.

The elbow bump is an informal greeting where two people touch elbows. Interest in this greeting was renewed during the avian flu scare of 2006, the 2009 swine flu pandemic, the Ebola outbreak of 2014, and the COVID-19 pandemic when health officials supported its use as an alternative to hand-shaking to reduce the spread of germs. During the latter pandemic, authorities advised that even an elbow bump was too risky, and suggested greeting from a distance.

== History ==
The elbow bump as a greeting is sometimes assumed to be derived from the more well known fist bump, beginning in the 1980s. Shaquille O'Neal demonstrated the derivative nature of the elbow bump in relation to the fist bump in 2004, when he dismissed Kobe Bryant's greeting with a half-hearted elbow bump.

== Popularity due to hygienic qualities ==
=== 2006 avian flu outbreak ===
A recent advocate of the elbow bump is the World Health Organization. In 2006, due to fears of a possible avian flu pandemic, the WHO proposed using the elbow bump as a means of "keeping other people's cooties at arms length." Michael Bell has been a principal advocate for using the elbow bump, noting that it can also help constrain the spread of diseases such as Ebola, by modeling social behavior that limits physical contact.

=== 2009 swine flu pandemic ===
Nobel prize winner Peter Agre recommends elbow bumping to prevent flu at a meeting of the AAAS in 2009

The elbow bump got renewed interest when the 2009 swine flu pandemic in Mexico began growing into a worldwide pandemic. By 2009, the elbow bump had grown so large in popularity that people in Mexico had taken it upon themselves to utilize the elbow bump to reduce the spread of disease. As in 2006, the elbow bump was supported by a number of health officials, such as Sanjay Gupta, CNN's chief medical correspondent.

=== 2012–2013 seasonal influenza epidemic ===
The Manhattan Soccer Club endorsed the elbow bump as the safe alternative to hand-to-hand contact.

At this point the MSC Board and the coaching staff would recommend that players not shake/touch hands with opponents after the games. The safest thing to do is to touch elbows. The coach or manager can explain this to the other team prior to the game.

=== Fall 2014 Ebola outbreak ===
In October 2014, an outbreak of the Ebola disease revived interest in the greeting.

=== COVID-19 pandemic ===
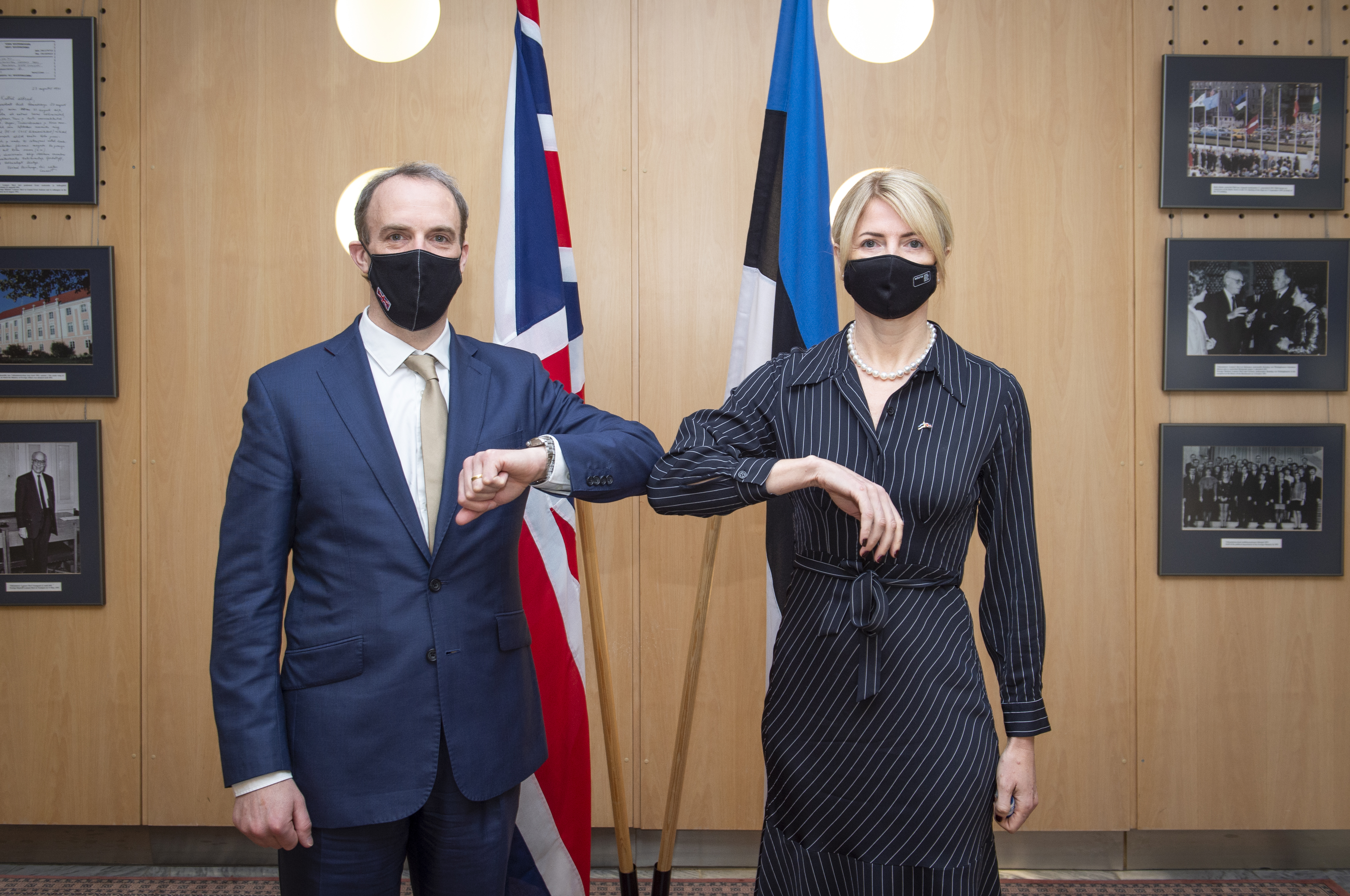
Dominic Raab (UK's Foreign Secretary) elbow bumps Eva-Maria Liimets (Estonia's Minister of Foreign Affairs) in Tallinn in March 2021

During the early stages of the COVID-19 pandemic in the United States, health officials advised people to avoid physical contact with others, including handshaking; the elbow bump was suggested as an alternative. At a 2 March press conference, U.S. Surgeon General Jerome Adams demonstrated the elbow bump to reporters, saying "We should probably rethink the handshake for a while."

As the epidemic spread, the elbow bump was discouraged as advice was broadened to recommend physical distancing, such as staying at least 2 metres away from other people, as a way to lessen the risk of catching or spreading the disease. The World Health Organization Director-General Tedros Adhanom Ghebreyesus advised that an elbow bump was too risky because it puts people too close to each other; he recommended using a non-contact greeting, such as putting one's hand on one's heart, from a separation distance of at least one meter.

== In culture ==
By 2009, the elbow bump was endorsed by many university officials, Nobel laureate Peter Agre, then President of the American Association for the Advancement of Science, and the World Health Organization. However, some of these endorsements were meant as much to elicit good humor as for purposes of good hygiene.

The word "elbow bump" was considered for Word of the Year in 2006 by the New Oxford American Dictionary.

At the open-air service of the Greenbelt festival of 2009, worshipers were encouraged to greet each other with the 'elbow bump of peace' instead of the more usual 'holy kiss' during the Christian rite of peace, because of concerns over swine flu.

In 2020, New York-based creative director Stephen Paul Wright launched an emoji for the 'elbow bump' in response to the COVID-19 pandemic.
