= Homer Galpin =

American politician

Homer Knickerbocker Galpin (December 11, 1871 – July 27, 1941) was an American politician and lawyer.

Galpin was born in Chicago, Illinois. He went to the public schools and took courses in business education. He graduated from the law department of Lake Forest College and was admitted to the Illinois bar in 1893. He practiced law in Chicago and was involved with the Republican Party. Galpin served as clerk of the Cook County Board of Review from 189 to 1905. He served in the Illinois Senate from 1905 to 1909. Galpin served on the Illinois Tax Commission. Galpin died at the Grant Hospital in Chicago, Illinois after being ill for a week.
