= Alastair Galpin =

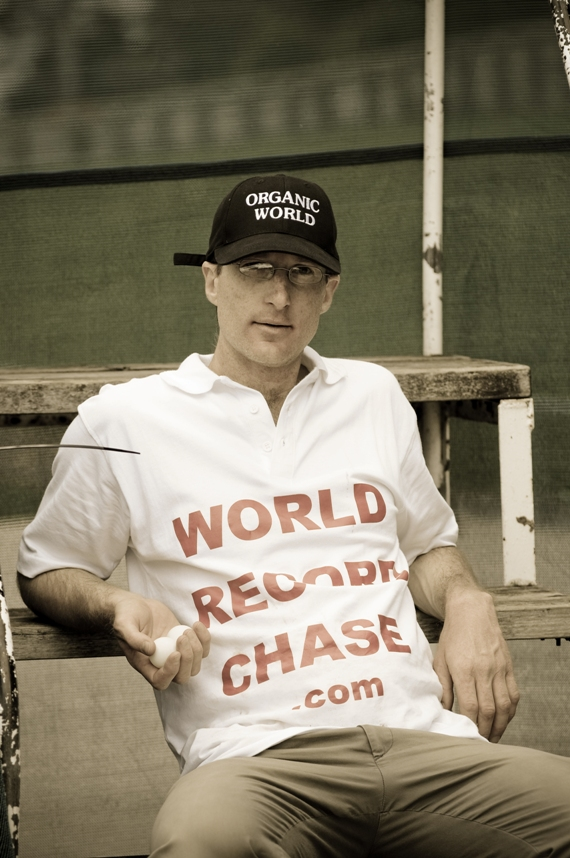
- November 2009
- Born: April 1974 (age 52); East London, South Africa
- Education: National Diploma in Forestry (Port Elizabeth Technikon, South Africa); BSc in Human Geography (University of Auckland, New Zealand)
- Occupations: Breaking world records, environmental supporter
- Notable credit: Second Biggest World Record Breaker of the Decade 2000–2009 (Guinness World Records)
- Relatives: Ernest Edward Galpin
- Family: Norman Galpin, father
- Website: http://www.worldrecordchase.com

Alastair Galpin (born 1974, East London, South Africa) is the 2nd biggest Guinness World Records breaker of the 2000s decade, breaking 38 World Records, behind Ashrita Furman. He immigrated to New Zealand in 2002, and says that his career in Record Breaking was inspired when he met champion rally driver, Simon Evans, in Kenya in 1998.

== World records ==
Alastair Galpin has broken over 85 world records for feats including having the most snails on the face (eight in 10 seconds) and the most rubber-bands stretched over the face (62 in one minute). He also holds the most stamps licked (57 in one minute), loudest clap, and the fastest time to peel and eat three kiwifruit.

Galpin is also the holder of the Guinness World Record for the most hugs in one hour in Civic Square, Wellington, New Zealand on 13 July 2007 (624 hugs) and achieved three new Guinness World Records at the Guinness World Records Day 2009 for Champagne-cork spitting, coin blowing, and Malteser (malt ball) spitting.

Along with New Zealander Don Purdon, Galpin commenced an attempt at the longest hand-shake at 8 pm EST on Friday 14 January 2011 in New York Times Square. After 33 hours, three minutes, they had smashed the existing record by more than 17 hours and shared the record with Nepalese brothers Rohit and Santosh Timilsina.

Event	Record	Location and Date
The loudest clap	113 dBA	University of Auckland, New Zealand, 2 November 2008
The fastest time to butter 10 slices of bread	52.42 seconds	Pt Chevalier, Auckland, New Zealand, on 3 December 2009
Longest full-body massage	25 hours 4 minutes	South Kalimantan, Indonesia, November 2015
The furthest champagne cork spit	7.23 m	Fremantle, Perth, Australia, November 2013
Tallest silverbeet plant	363.5 cm	Auckland, New Zealand in 2008
The most high fives in one minute	76	Trusts Stadium, Waitakere, Auckland, New Zealand, on 14 November 2009
The most lit candles in the mouth	8	Lo Show dei Record, Milan, Italy, on 15 March 2011
Largest bottle cap sculpture (shared)	19,205 caps	Auckland, New Zealand in 2010
The most gloves put on one hand in one minute	13	Britomart Transport Centre, Auckland, New Zealand, on 12 November 2009
The most baseballs held in the hand (palm down)	4	Old Homestead, Auckland, New Zealand, on 28 April 2007
The most side jumps (alternating each leg) achieved in a minute	90	The Warehouse shop in Sylvia Park, Auckland, New Zealand, on 27 October 2007.
Furthest surface journey in a male chastity device	4,894.6 km	Borneo, Indonesia, in November 2014
Most M&M pretzels moved with a straw in 1 minute	62	Auckland, New Zealand, on 24 September 2012
Largest cartoon (shared)	862.8 square metres	Auckland, New Zealand in November 2006
The farthest coin flick	12.11 m (39 ft 9 in)	Britomart Transport Centre, Auckland, New Zealand, on 12 November 2009

== Charitable awareness raising ==
Galpin seeks to raise awareness – and sometimes raise funds – for social and environmental causes. He uses various methods to spread knowledge of environmental issues, including referring to issues of global concern in his website's stories, and during his motivational storytelling in schools.

His opinion piece, titled 'Human Application of Consciousness' – while not directly related to world record-breaking, explains Galpin's drive to contribute to the struggle for a truly sustainable future for mankind and other life on earth. He does so by collaborating with non-profits and organisations on projects of varying degrees of social and environmental importance.

Other initiatives include dropping gambling machines from a record height to highlight gambling harm, preparing a record-sized bowl of shared soup to promote healthy eating in disadvantaged communities, and conducting a record number of radio interviews from a suspended cage to draw attention to problem gambling.

== Unusual feats ==
His activities were played down by some US websites covering "most ridiculous" and "least impressive" world records and he has also attracted US television coverage for similar reasons. Among other print media, The Citizen has featured his work.
