= Galpin Lake =

Lake in the state of Minnesota, United States

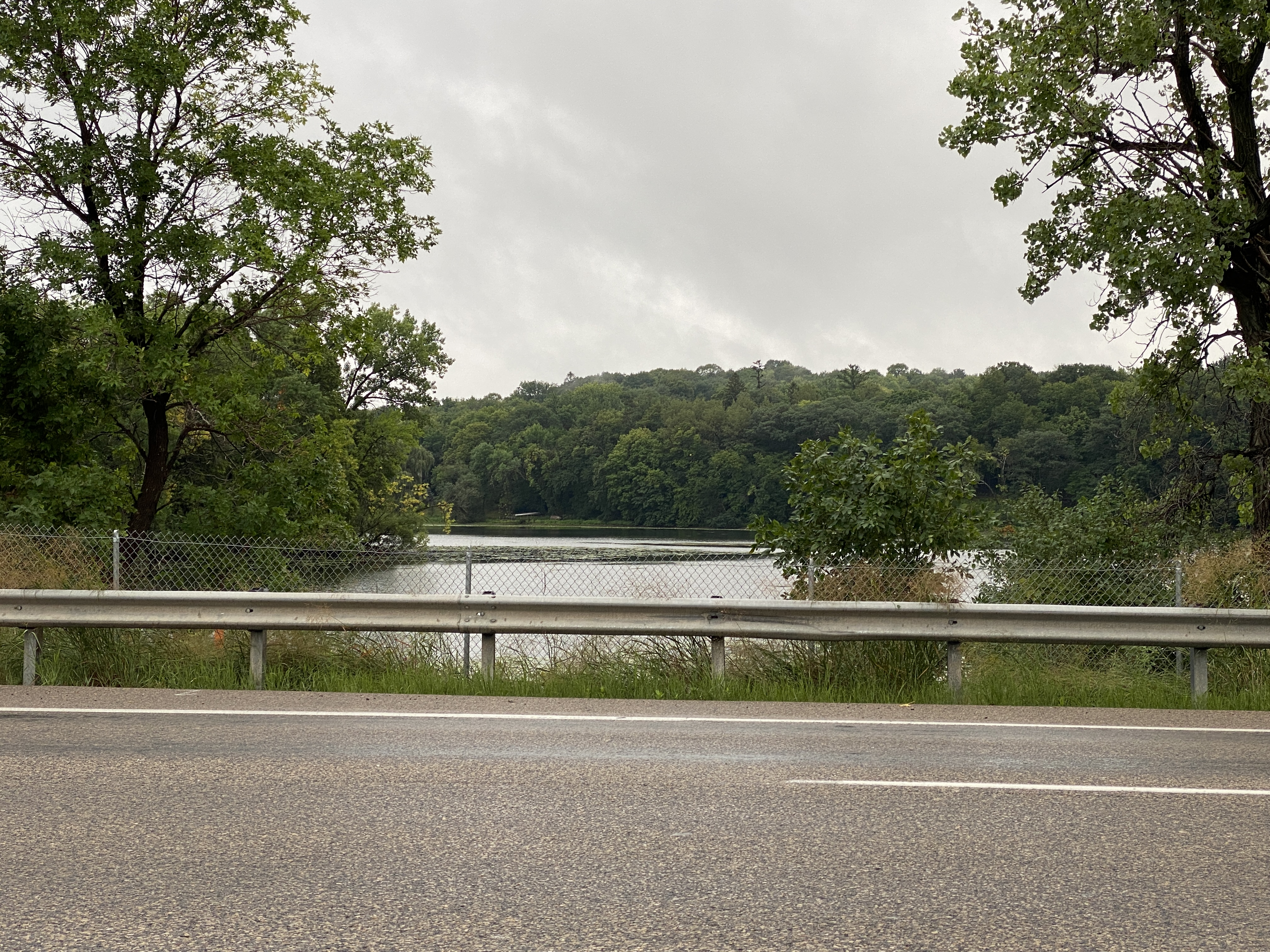
- Galpin Lake from Minnesota State Highway 7

- Location within Minnesota
- Location: Hennepin County, Minnesota
- Coordinates: 44°53′48″N 93°33′53″W
- Type: lake

Galpin Lake is a lake in Hennepin County, Minnesota, in the United States. The northern part of the lake is in Excelsior and the southern part is in Shorewood.

Galpin Lake was named for Charles Galpin, a local pastor. It was previously park of the much smaller Mud Lake, slightly north of Galpin Lake, prior to the construction of Minnesota State Highway 7, which bisected the lake.

== See also ==
- List of lakes in Minnesota
