= Giving dap =

Hand gesture

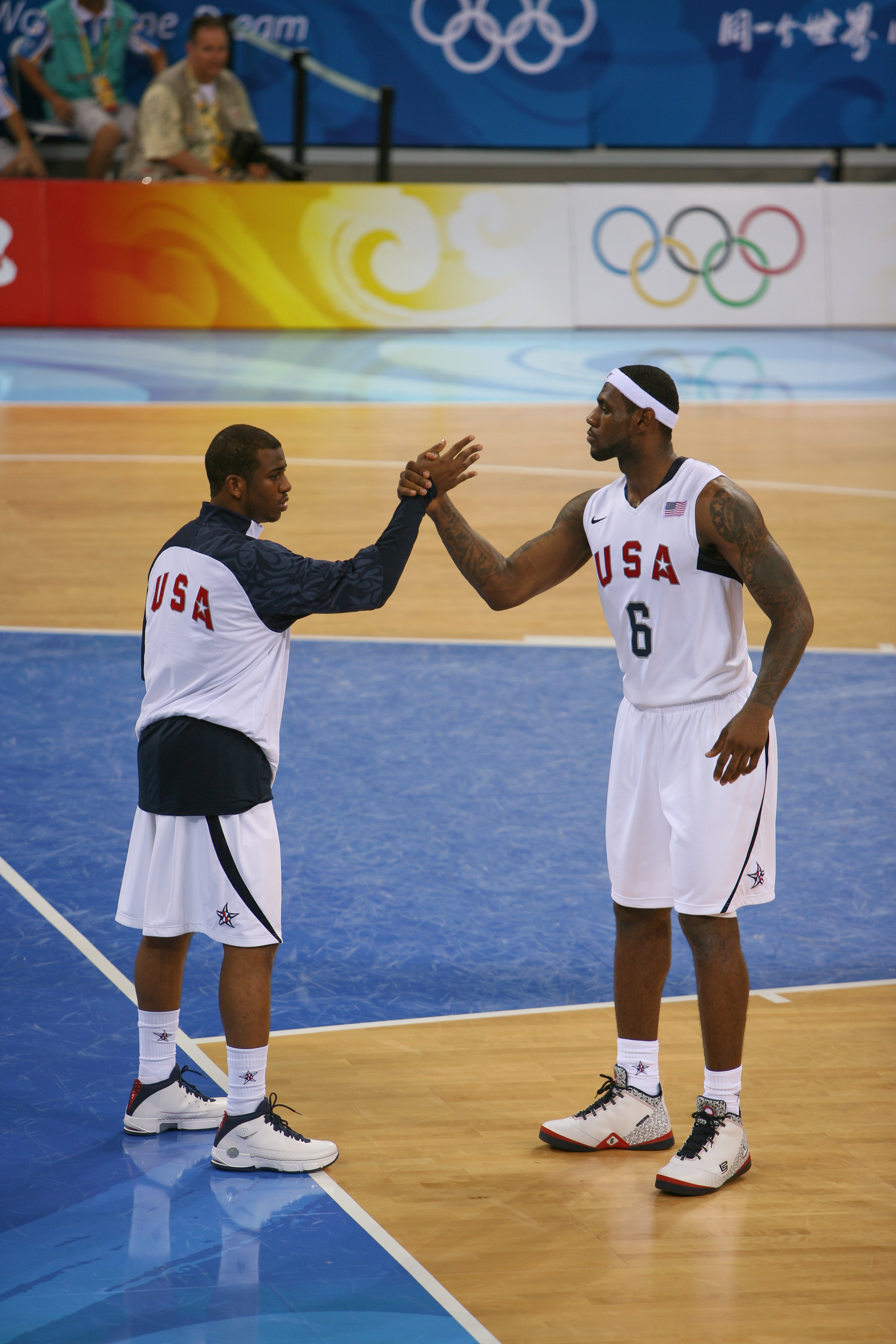
LeBron James giving dap to Chris Paul at the 2008 Summer Olympics in Beijing, China

One of the most common gestures in dap greetings: the fist bump

Giving dap, also called dapping or dapping up, is a gesture or series of gestures between two people that signals greeting, agreement, or solidarity. Giving dap primarily involves fist bumping or handshaking (typically by hooking the thumbs or sliding the hands together), sometimes accompanied by pound hugging, chest bumping, finger snapping, or other gestures. Dapping thus may involve a sequence of gestures as opposed to a single gesture, similar to a secret handshake. Dapping has become popular in Western culture, originating from African-American soldiers during the Vietnam War.

Giving dap can refer to presenting many kinds of positive nonverbal communication between two people, ranging from a brief moment of simple bodily contact to a complicated routine of hand bumps, shakes, and snaps. If known only by its two participants or by a limited group, it can be considered a secret handshake. Elaborate examples of dap are observed as a pregame ritual performed by many teams in the National Basketball Association, serving as a means of psychological preparation and team solidarity.

== Vietnam War ==
The practice and term originated among black soldiers during the Vietnam War as part of the Black Power movement. Ninety percent of those imprisoned in the Long Binh Jail during the war were African Americans; it was in the jail that the handshake was created under pan-African nationalist influences.

Its main use was to instill solidarity among black American soldiers, conveying their commitment to look after one another. This was a response to the racism black Americans faced during Vietnam War deployment, including several cases of white soldiers shooting fellow black soldiers during combat. It sometimes contained information "such as what to expect at the battlefront or what had transpired during an operation". White military officials feared the handshake, believing the coded language included plans for a potential black insurrection. Due to these fears, military officials banned dapping, and "many black soldiers were court-martialed, jailed, and even dishonorably discharged as a punishment for dapping". However, the censorship only solidified the need for unity among black American soldiers.

Despite the suppression of these greetings, the military later used dapping to increase trust for black combatants with post-traumatic stress disorder who needed medical treatment. Officers "would bring in black G.I.s fluent in the dap to dap with these men to build their trust up to accept treatment from white doctors and staff".

== Contemporary ==
In 2013, American photographer LaMont Hamilton created Five on the Black Hand Side, a photo series depicting African American men's handshakes as part of dap greetings. The name of the project likely comes from a clapping game. Combining the photographs with oral histories, Hamilton noted his discovery that "there is a tremendous diversity of daps, evolving from the dramatically different movements and meanings of each military company".

== Etymology ==
The etymology of dap is uncertain, and there are various theories. Most simply, it may be imitative (compare tap, dap), and is sometimes explained as an acronym for dignity and pride, possibly a backronym.
