= Respect =

Feeling of regard for someone or something

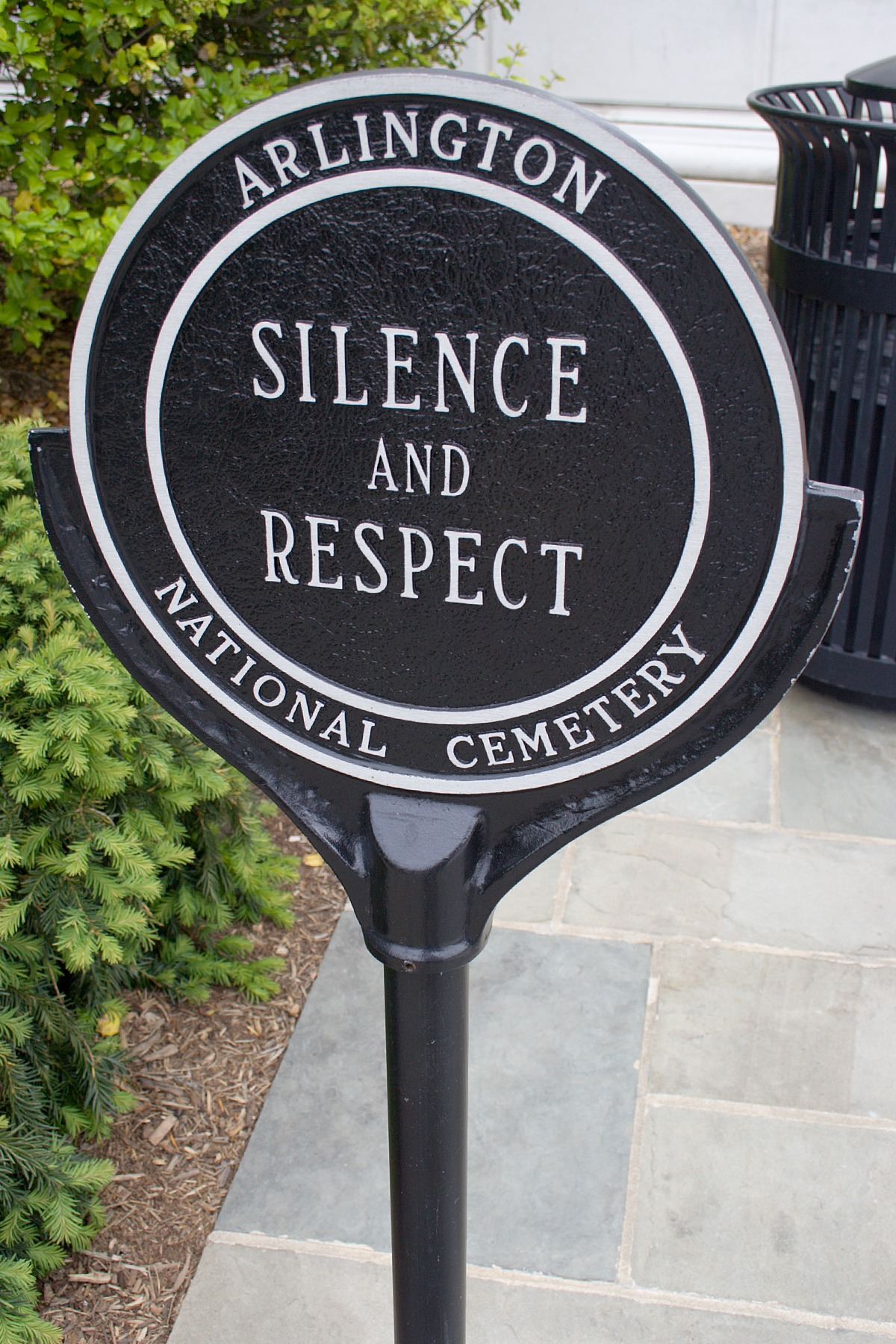
A sign entreating "silence and respect" at Arlington National Cemetery

Respect, also called esteem, is a positive feeling or deferential action shown towards someone or something considered important or held in high esteem or regard. It conveys a sense of admiration for good or valuable qualities. It is also the process of honoring someone by exhibiting care, concern, or consideration for their needs or feelings.

In many cultures, people are considered to be worthy of respect until they prove otherwise. Some people may earn special respect through their exemplary actions or social roles. In "honor cultures", respect is more often earned in this way than granted by default. Courtesies that show respect may include simple words and phrases like "thank you" in the West or "namaste" in the Indian subcontinent, or simple physical signs like a slight bow, a smile, direct eye contact, or a handshake. Such acts may have very different interpretations depending on the cultural context. The end goal is for all people to be treated with respect.

== Signs and other ways of showing respect ==
=== Language ===
One definition of respect is a feeling of admiration for someone or something elicited by their abilities, qualities, and achievements.

An honorific is a word or expression (such as a title like "Doctor" or a pronoun form) that shows respect when used in addressing or referring to a person.

Typically honorifics are used for second and third persons; use for first person is less common. Some languages have anti-honorific first person forms (like "your most humble servant" or "this unworthy person") whose effect is to enhance the relative honor accorded a second or third person.

For example, it is disrespectful not to use polite language and honorifics when speaking in Japanese with someone having a higher social status. The Japanese honorific "san" can be used when English is spoken.

In China, it is considered rude to call someone by their first name unless the person is known by the speaker for a long period of time. In work-related situations, people address each other by their titles. At home, people often refer to each other by nicknames or terms of kinship. In Chinese culture, individuals often address their friends as juniors and seniors even if they are just a few months younger or older. When the Chinese ask for someone's age, they often do so to know how to address the person.

=== Physical gestures ===
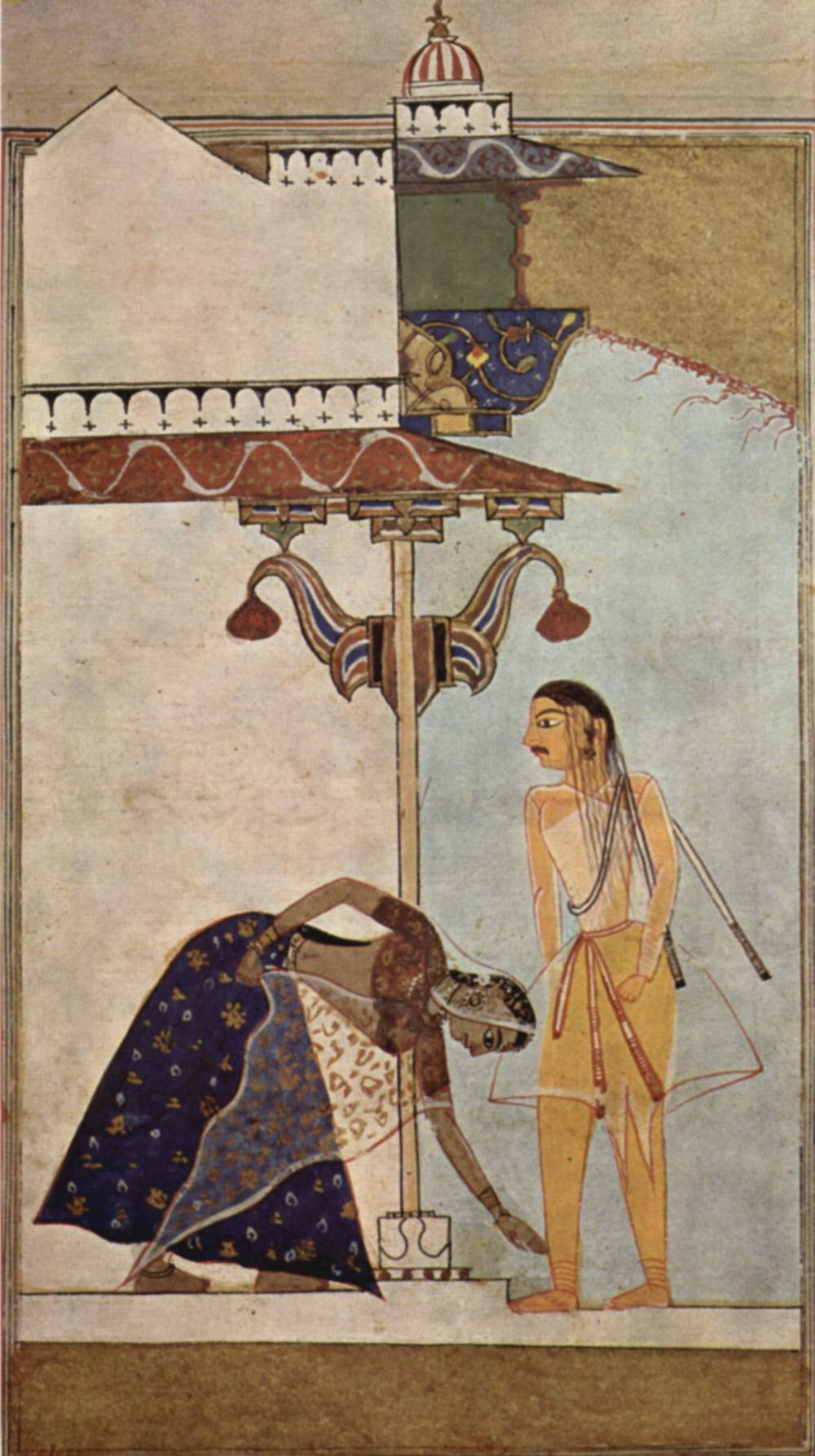
A wife touching the feet of her husband

In Islamic cultures, there are many ways to show respect to people. For example, one may kiss the hands of parents, grandparents, or teachers. It is narrated in the sayings of Muhammad "Your smiling in the face of your brother is charity". It is also important for Muslims to treat the Quran with great care, as it's considered the word of God. Actions like placing it on the floor or handling it with unclean hands are forbidden and should be followed by a prayer of forgiveness.

In India, it is customary that, out of respect, when a person's foot accidentally touches a book or any written material (considered to be a manifestations of Saraswati, the goddess of knowledge) or another person's body, it will be followed by an apology in the form of a single hand gesture (pranāma) with the right hand, where the offending person first touches the object with the finger tips and then the forehead and/or chest. This also counts for money, which is considered to be a manifestation of the goddess of wealth, Lakshmi. Pranāma, or the touching of feet in Indian culture is a sign of respect. For instance, when a child greets their grandparents, they typically will touch their hands to their grandparents' feet. In Indian culture, it is believed that the feet are a source of love and power.

In many African/West Indian descent communities and some non-African/West Indian descent communities, respect can be signified by the touching of fists.

Many gestures or physical acts that are common in the West can be considered disrespectful in Japan. For instance, one should not point directly at someone. When greeting someone or thanking them, it may be insulting if the person of lower status does not bow lower than the person with higher status. The duration and level of the bow depends on many factors such as age and status. Some signs of physical respect apply to women only. If a woman does not wear cosmetics or a brassiere, it is possible that she will be considered unprofessional or others may think she does not care about her situation.

== Respect as a virtue ==
Respect for others is often viewed as a virtue or character strength. Aristotle argued this virtue as foundational to justice itself, stating in Nicomachean Ethics that "justice, alone of the virtues, is thought to be 'another's good', because it is related to our neighbour; for it does what is advantageous to another, either a ruler or a copartner. Now the worst man is he who exercises his wickedness both towards himself and towards his friends, and the best man is not he who exercises his virtue towards himself but he who exercises it towards another; for this is a difficult task."

The philosopher Immanuel Kant made the virtue of respect the core of his Categorical Imperative:

So act that you treat humanity… always at the same time as an end, never merely as a means.

John Stuart Mill advocated for this virtue to be a governing principle of social conduct more broadly rather than exclusively a personal virtue. In On Liberty, Mill argued that "the only purpose for which power can be rightfully exercised over any member of a civilised community, against his will, is to prevent harm to others."

== Respect as a cultural value ==
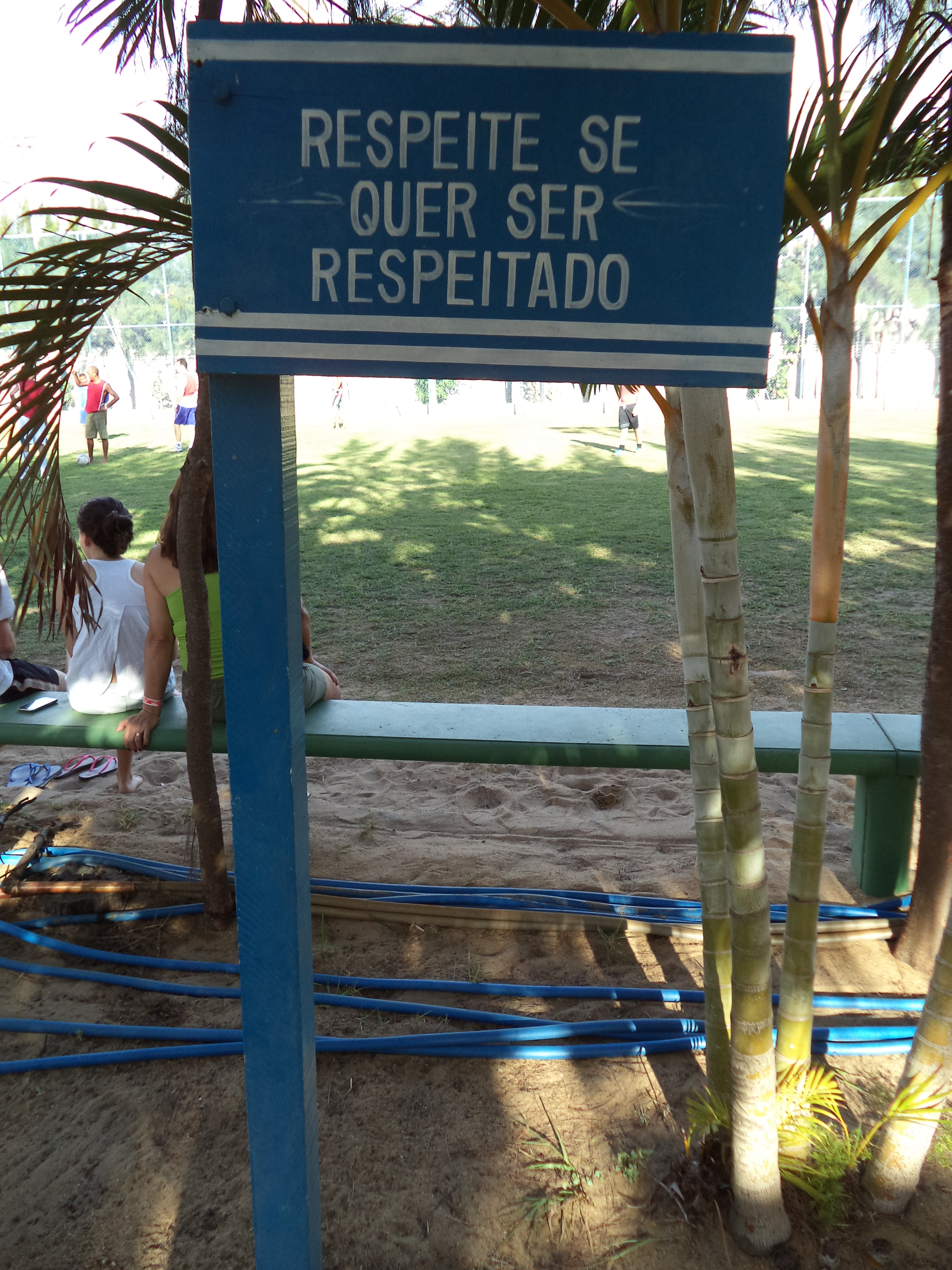
Sign in São João da Barra saying "respect if you want to be respected"

=== Chinese culture ===
In Chinese culture, bowing is generally reserved as a sign of respect for elders and ancestors. When bowing, they place the fist of the right hand in the palm of their left at stomach level. The deeper the bow, the more respect they are showing.

Traditionally, there was not much hand-shaking in Chinese culture. However, this gesture is now widely practiced among people, especially when greeting Westerners or other foreigners. Many Westerners may find Chinese handshakes to be too long or too weak, but this is because Chinese people consider a weaker handshake to be a gesture of humility and respect.

Kowtowing, or kneeling and bowing so deeply that one's forehead is touching the floor, is practiced during worship at temples. Kowtowing is a powerful gesture reserved mainly for honoring the dead or offering deep respect at a temple.

Many codes of behavior revolve around young people showing respect to older people. Filial piety is a virtue of having respect for ancestors, family, and elders. As in many cultures, younger Chinese individuals are expected to defer to older people, let them speak first, sit down after them, and not contradict them. Sometimes when an older person enters a room, everyone stands. People are often introduced from oldest to youngest. Often, younger people will go out of their way to open doors for their elders and not cross their legs in front of them. The older you are the more respect you are expected to be treated with.

=== Indigenous American culture ===
In many indigenous American societies, respect is viewed as a moral value that teaches indigenous people about their culture. This moral value is treated as a process that influences participation in the community and also helps people develop and become integrated into their culture. For this reason, the value of respect is taught during childhood.

Respect as a form of behavior and participation is especially important as a basis of how children must conduct themselves in their community. Children engage in mature activities such as cooking for the family, cleaning and sweeping the house, caring for infant peers, and crop work. Indigenous children learn to view their participation in these activities as a representation of respect. Through this manner of showing respect by participation in activities, children not only learn about culture but also practice it as well.

== See also ==
- Asch conformity experiments
- Attention
- Dignity
- Etiquette
  - Category:Social graces
  - Etiquette in Asia
- Golden Rule
- Identity (social science)
- Impression management
- Milgram experiment
- Non-aggression principle
- Peace Love Unity Respect
- Social comparison theory
- Social death
- Social support
- Value (ethics and social sciences)
