= Handshake =

Short human greeting or parting ritual

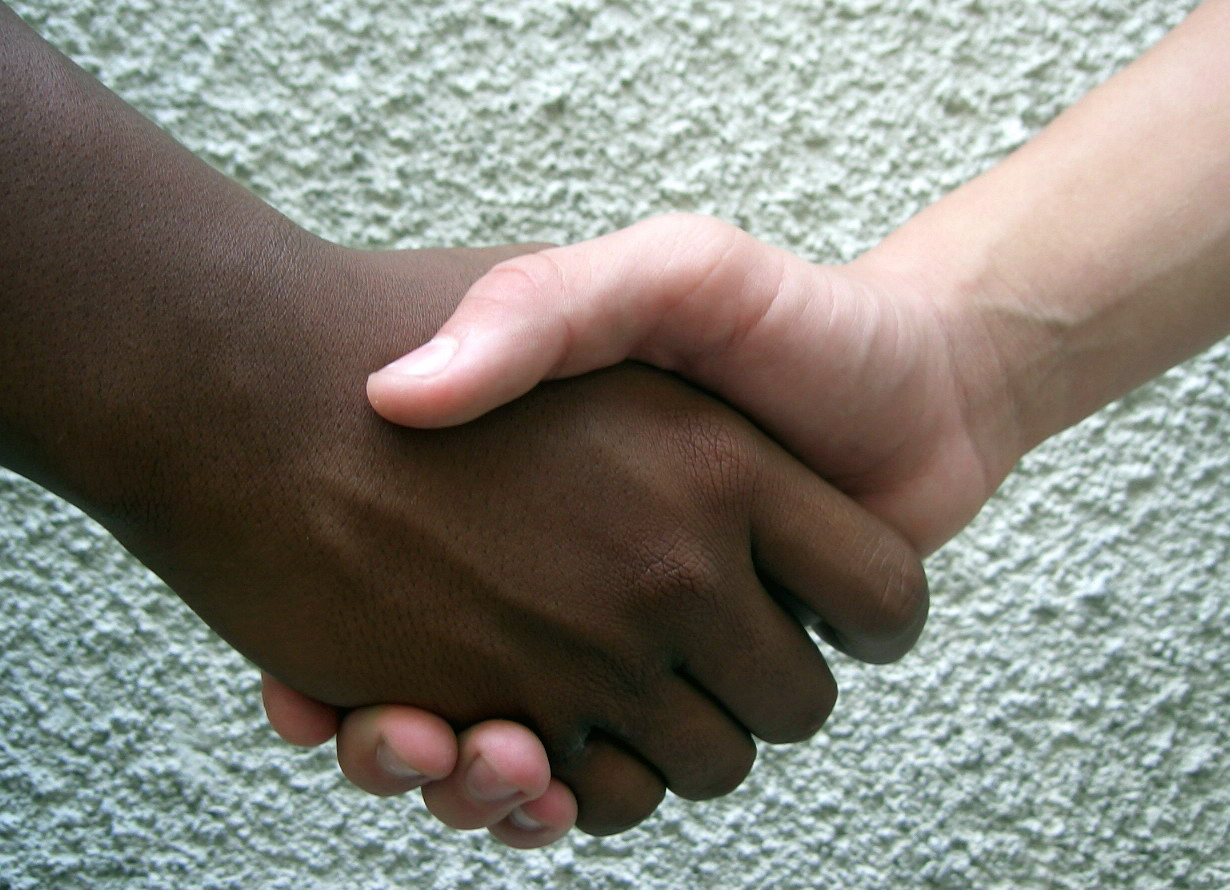
Two people shaking hands

A handshake is a globally widespread, brief greeting or parting tradition in which two people grasp one of each other's hands, and in most cases, it is accompanied by a brief up-and-down movement of the grasped hands. Customs surrounding handshakes are specific to cultures. Different cultures may be more or less likely to shake hands, or there may be different customs about how or when to shake hands.

== History ==
The handshake may have originated in prehistory as a demonstration of peaceful intent, since it shows that the hand holds no weapon. Another possibility is that it originated as a symbolic gesture of mutual commitment to an oath or promise: two hands clasping each other represents the sealing of a bond. One of the earliest known depictions of a handshake is an ancient Assyrian relief of the 9th century BC depicting the Assyrian king Shalmaneser III clasping the hand of the Babylonian king Marduk-zakir-shumi I to seal an alliance. Archaeological ruins and ancient texts show that handshaking was practiced in ancient Greece (where it was called dexiosis) as early as the 5th century BC. For example, a depiction of two soldiers joining hands can be found on part of a 5th-century BC funerary stele that is on display in Berlin's Pergamon Museum (stele SK1708) and on other funerary steles, such as one from the 4th century BC that depicts Thraseas and his wife Euandria shaking hands.

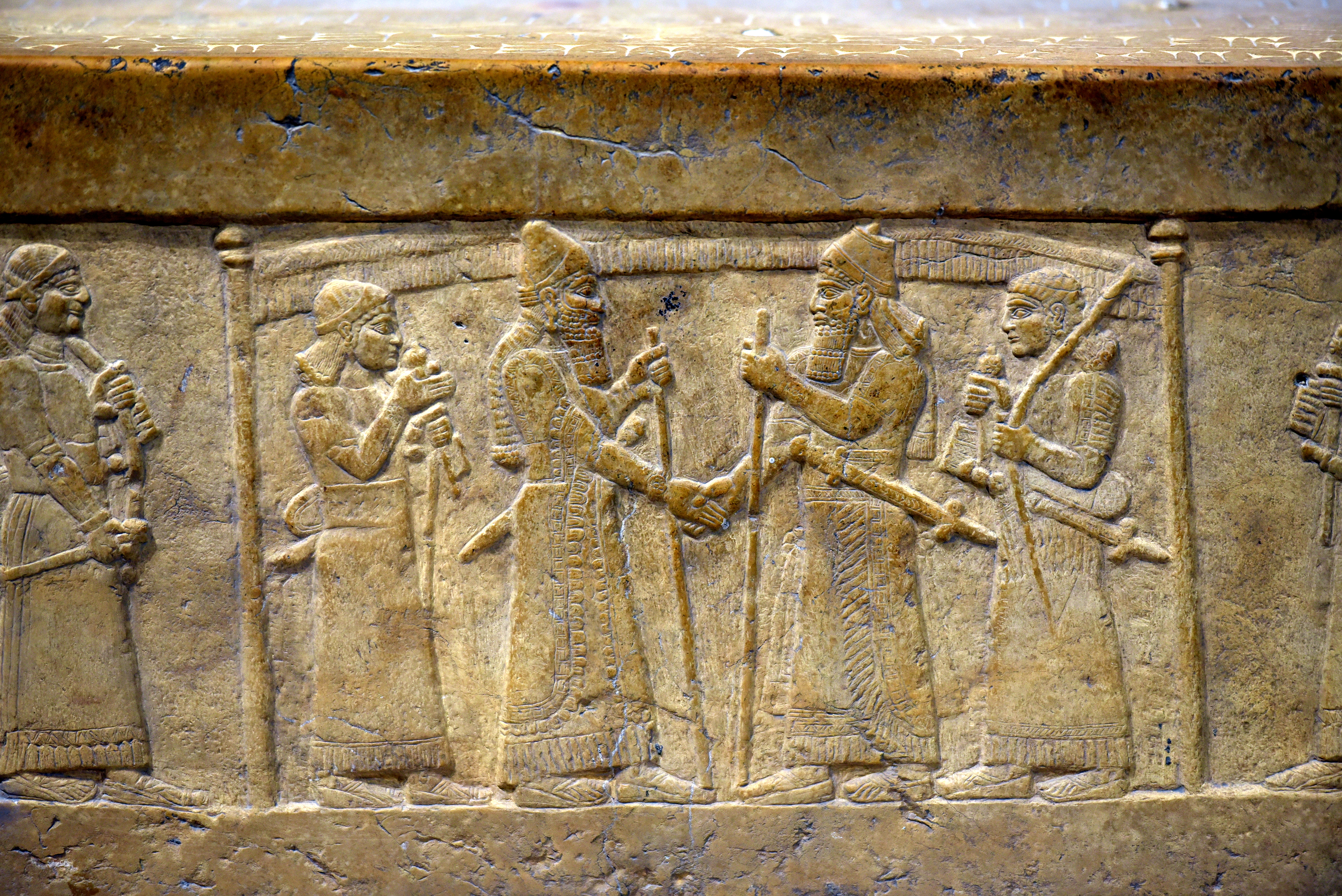
Assyrian king Shalmaneser III (right) shakes the hand of Babylonian king Marduk-zakir-shumi I (left), 9th century BCE

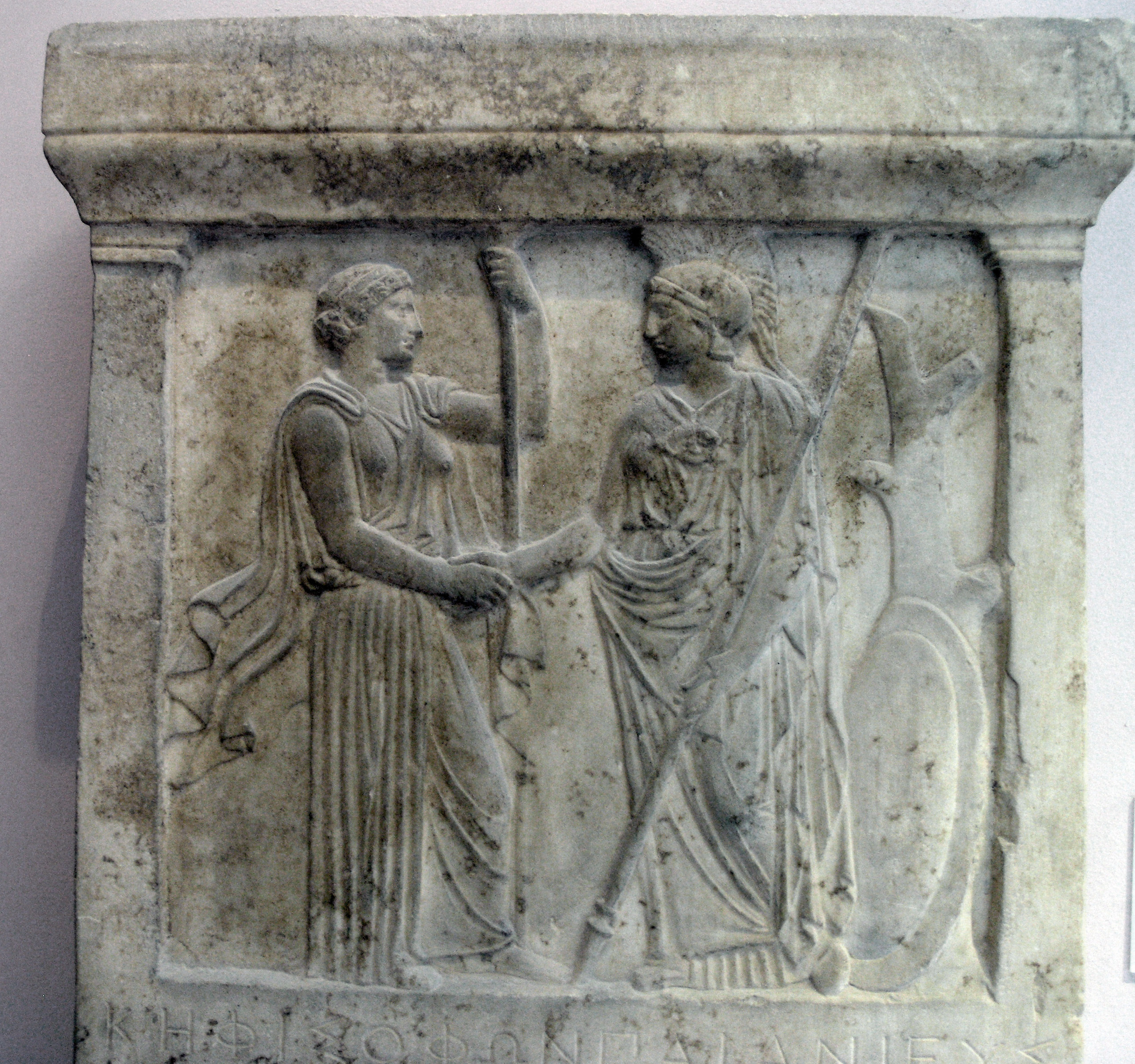
Hera and Athena handshaking, late 5th century BC, Acropolis Museum, Athens

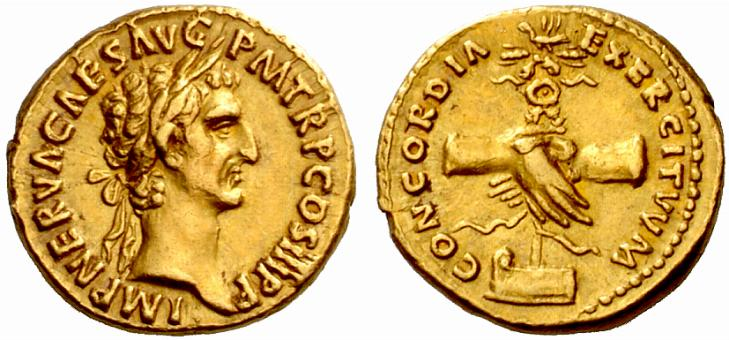
Handshake depicted on a Roman coin, with the name of the goddess Concordia (AD 97) Depictions of handshakes also appear in Archaic Greek, Etruscan and Roman funerary and non-funerary art. Muslim scholars have written that the custom of handshaking was introduced to them by the people of Yemen.

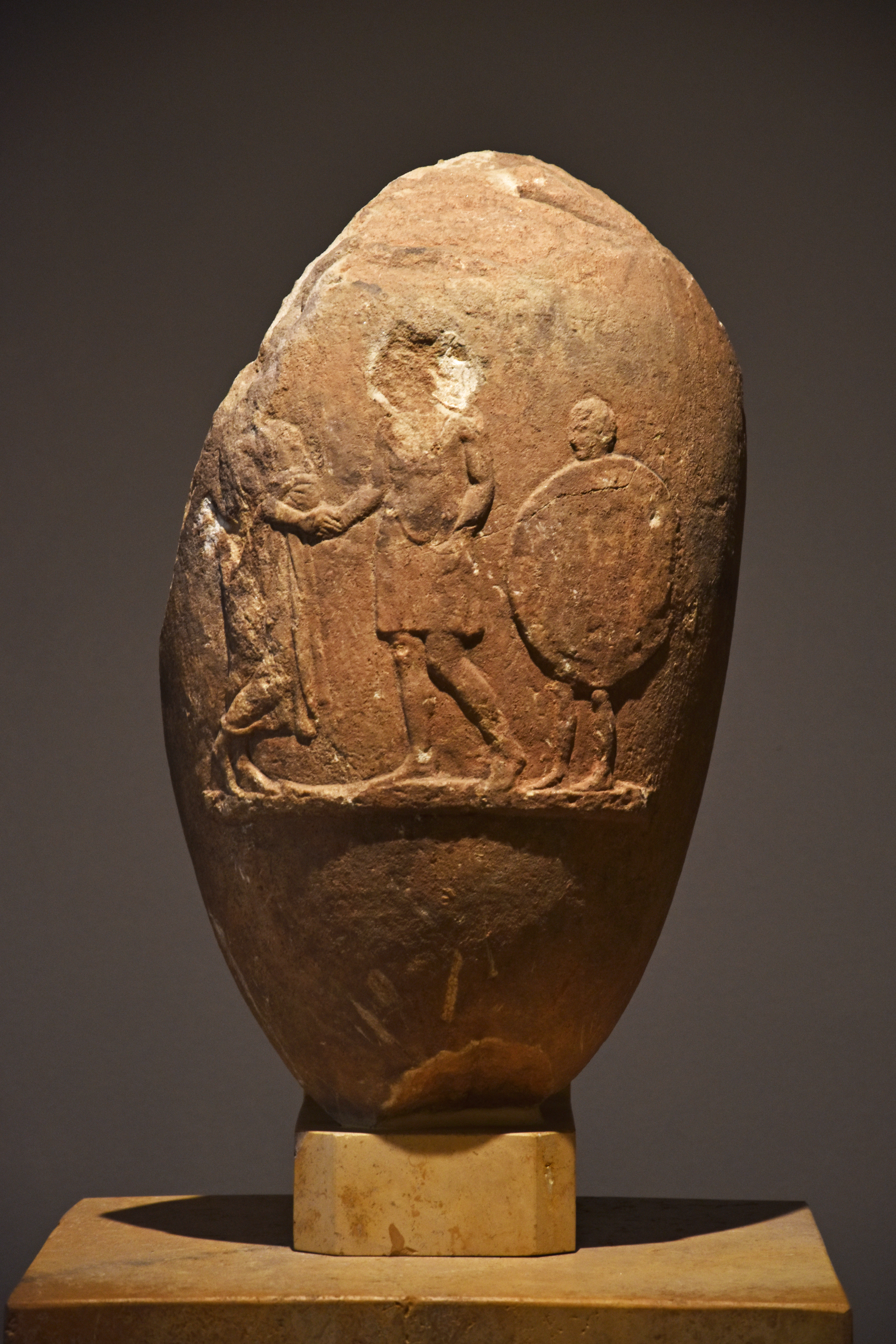
Hoplite greeting an older man with slave carrying the aspis

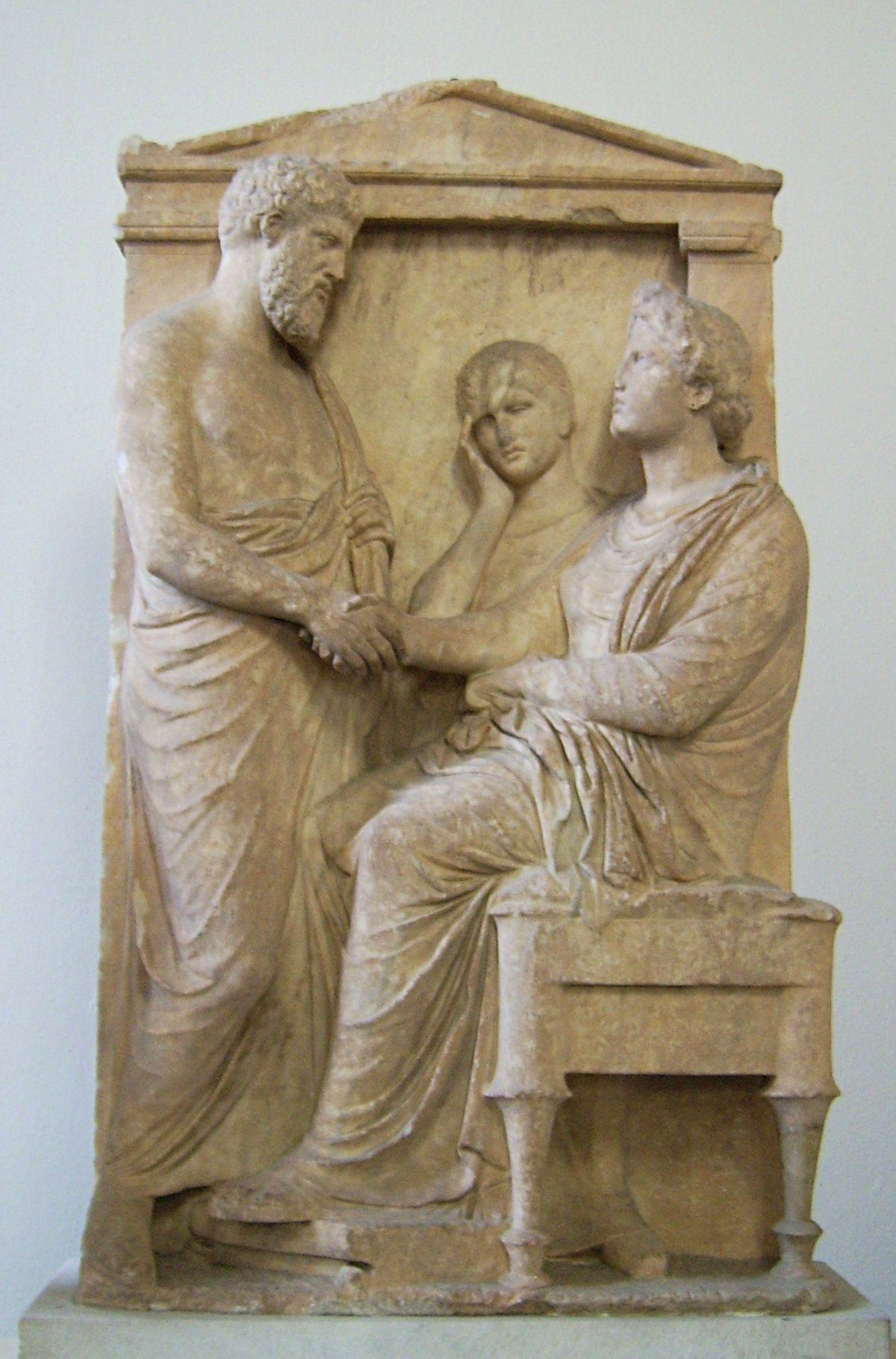
Funerary stele of Thrasea and Euandria. Marble, c. 375–350 BC. Antikensammlung Berlin, Pergamon Museum, 738.

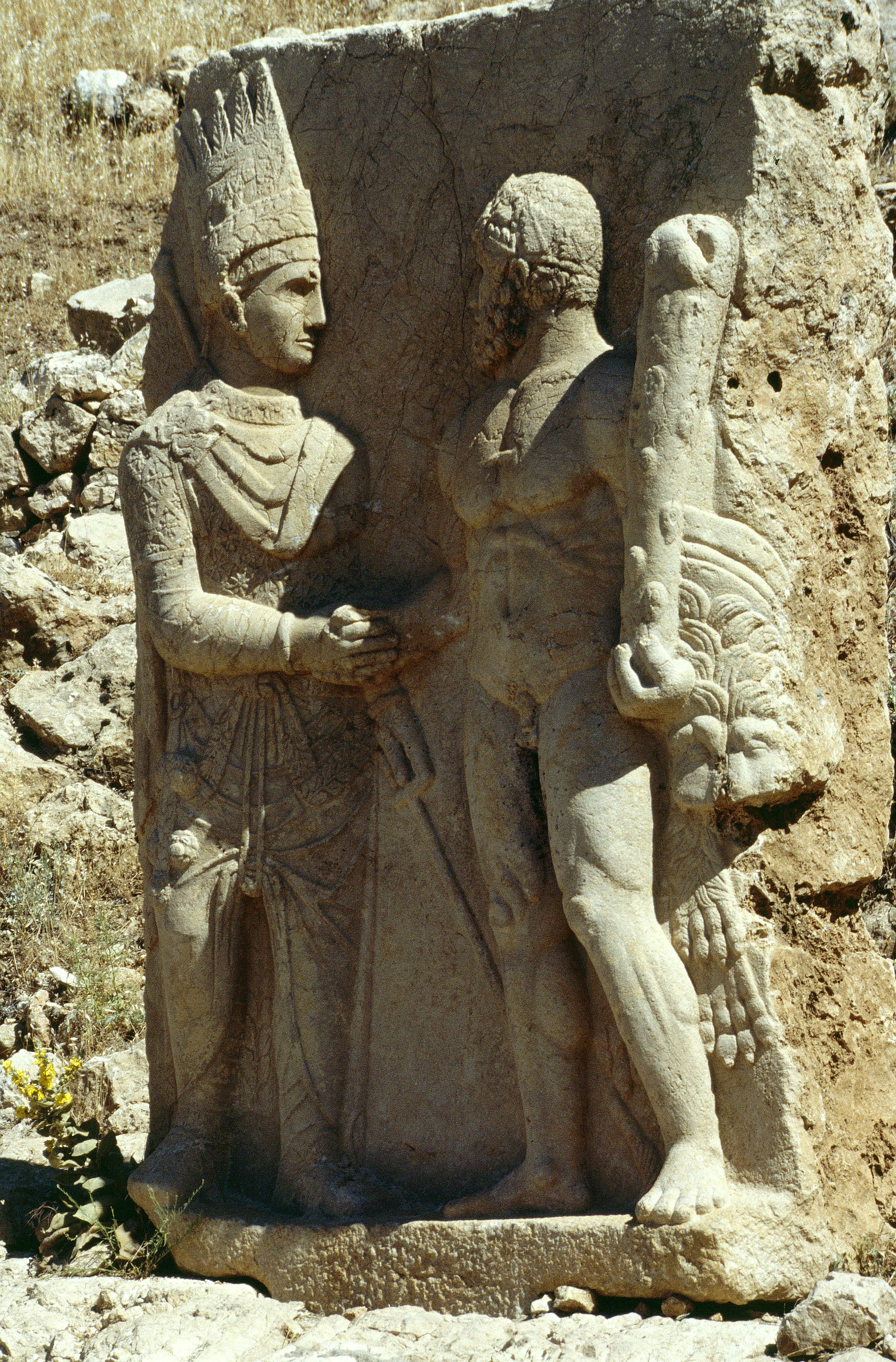
Antiochus I Theos of Commagene, shaking hands with Heracles 70–38 BC, Arsameia

== Modern customs ==
There are various customs surrounding handshakes, both generally and specific to certain cultures:

The handshake is commonly done upon meeting, greeting, parting, offering congratulations, expressing gratitude, or as a public sign of completing a business or diplomatic agreement. In sports, it is also done as a sign of good sportsmanship. Its purpose is to convey trust, respect, balance, and equality. If it is done to form an agreement, the agreement is not official until the hands are parted.

Unless health issues or local customs dictate otherwise, a handshake is made usually with bare hands. It depends on the situation.

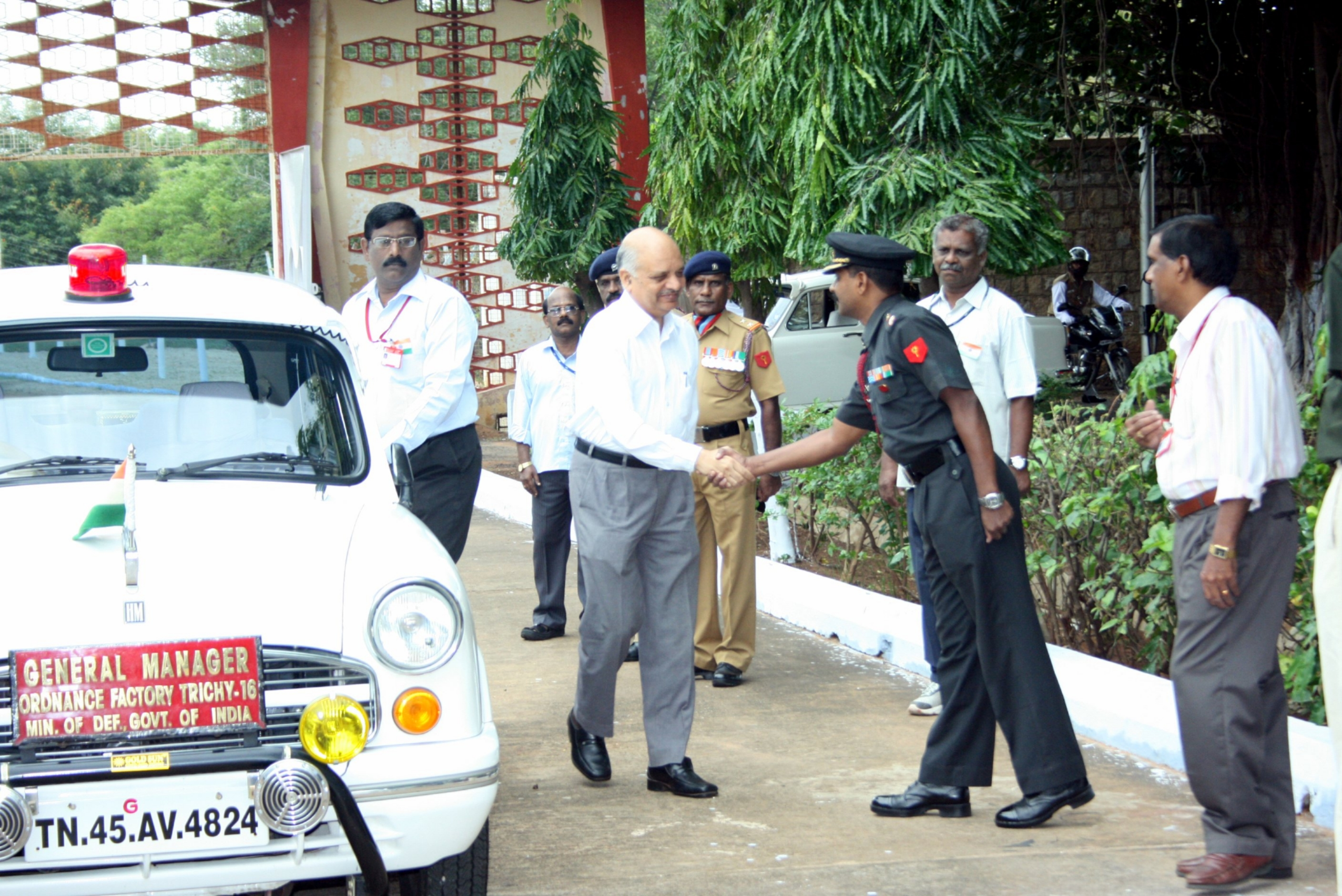
Officers shaking hands

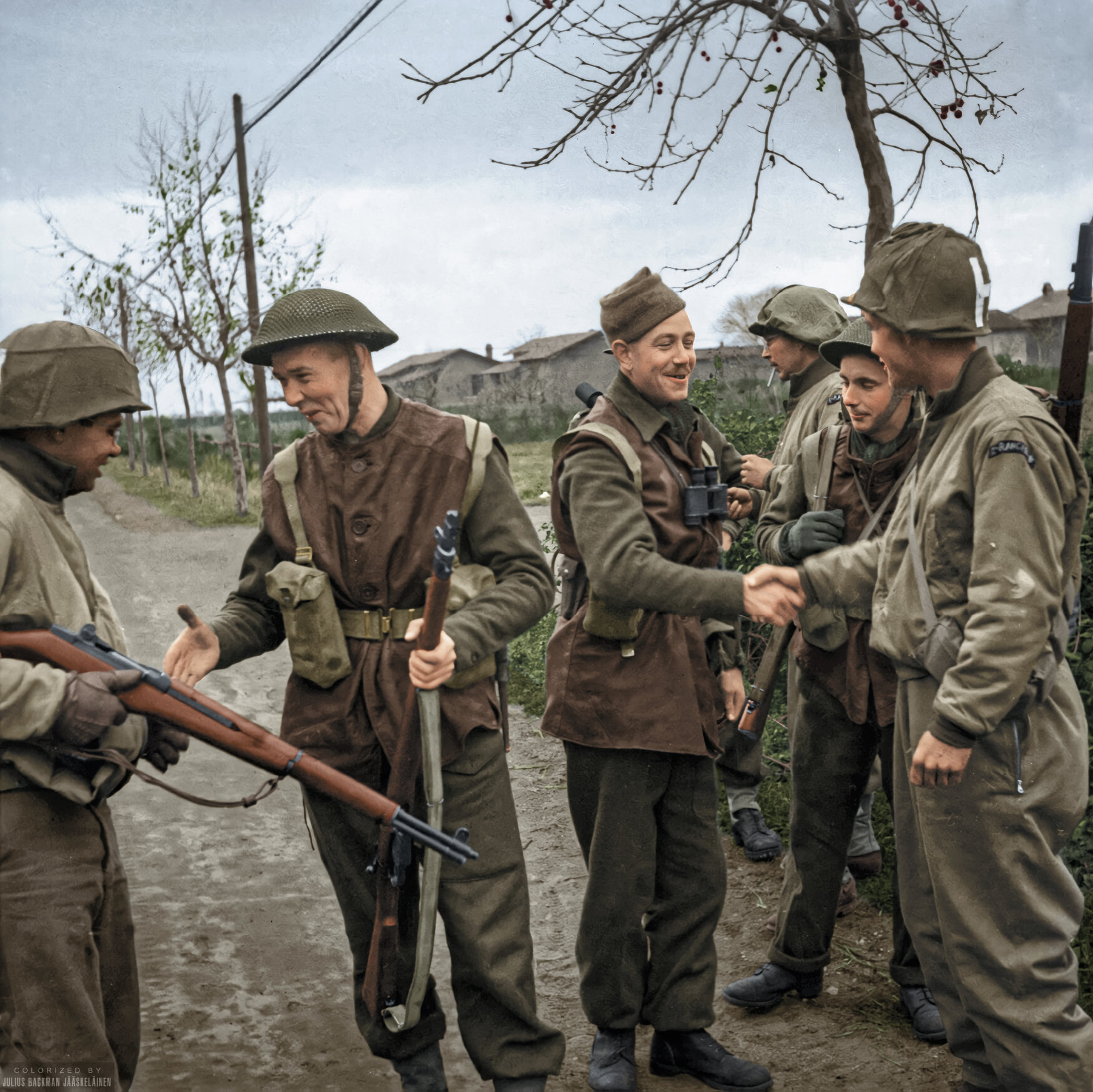
British and American troops shake hands on the Anzio Road during World War II.

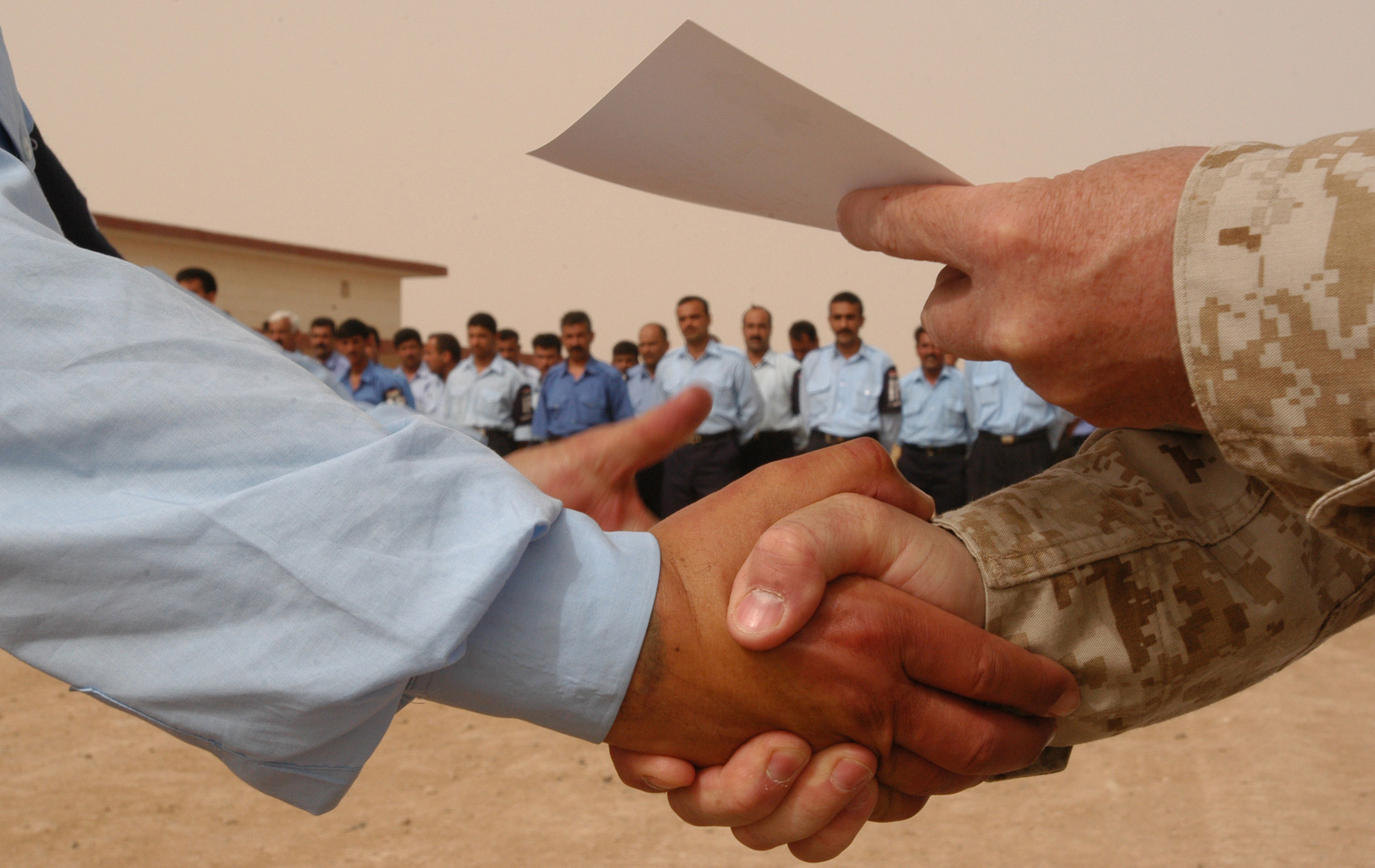
Shaking with the right hand while delivering a certificate with the left

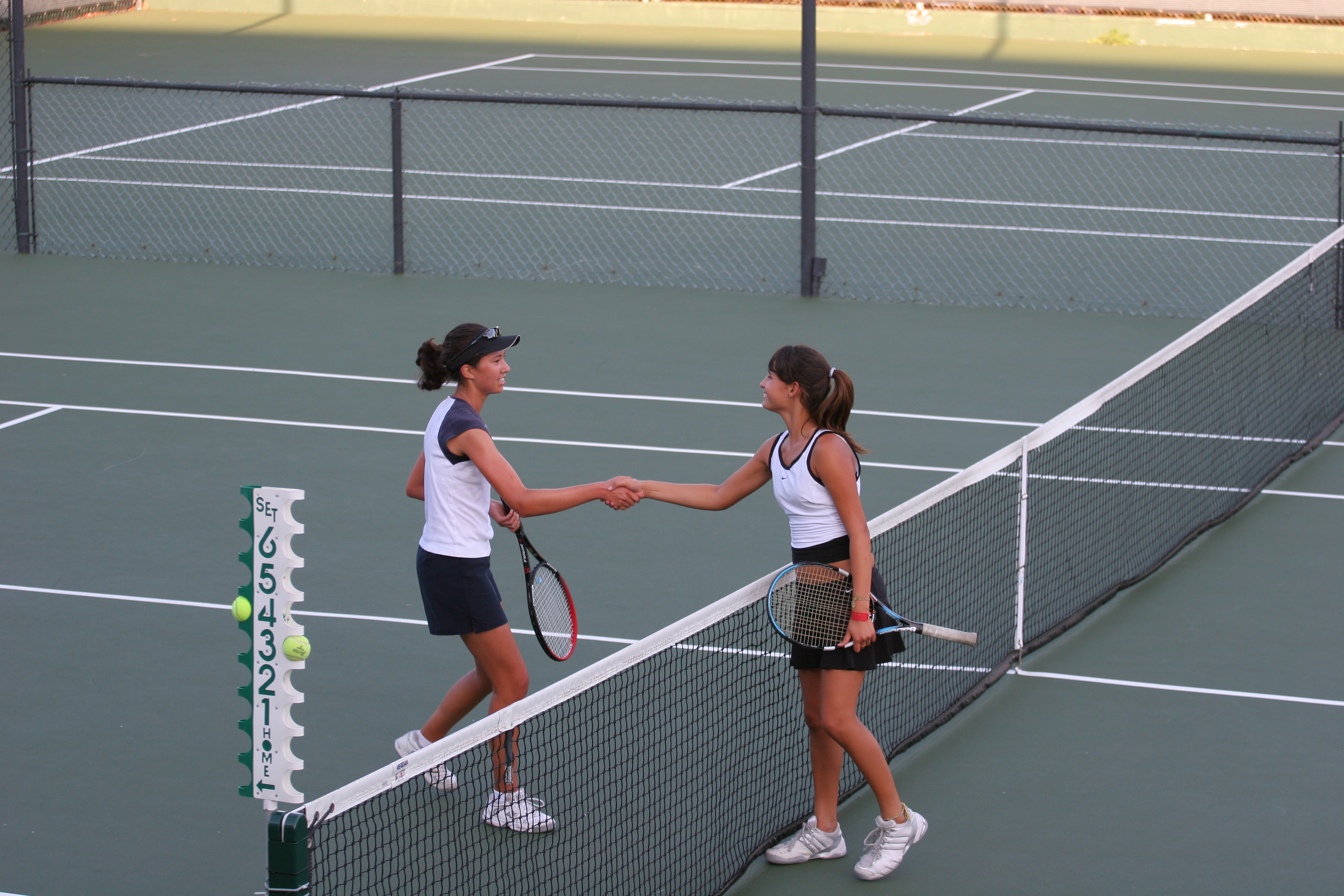
Tennis players shaking hands after match

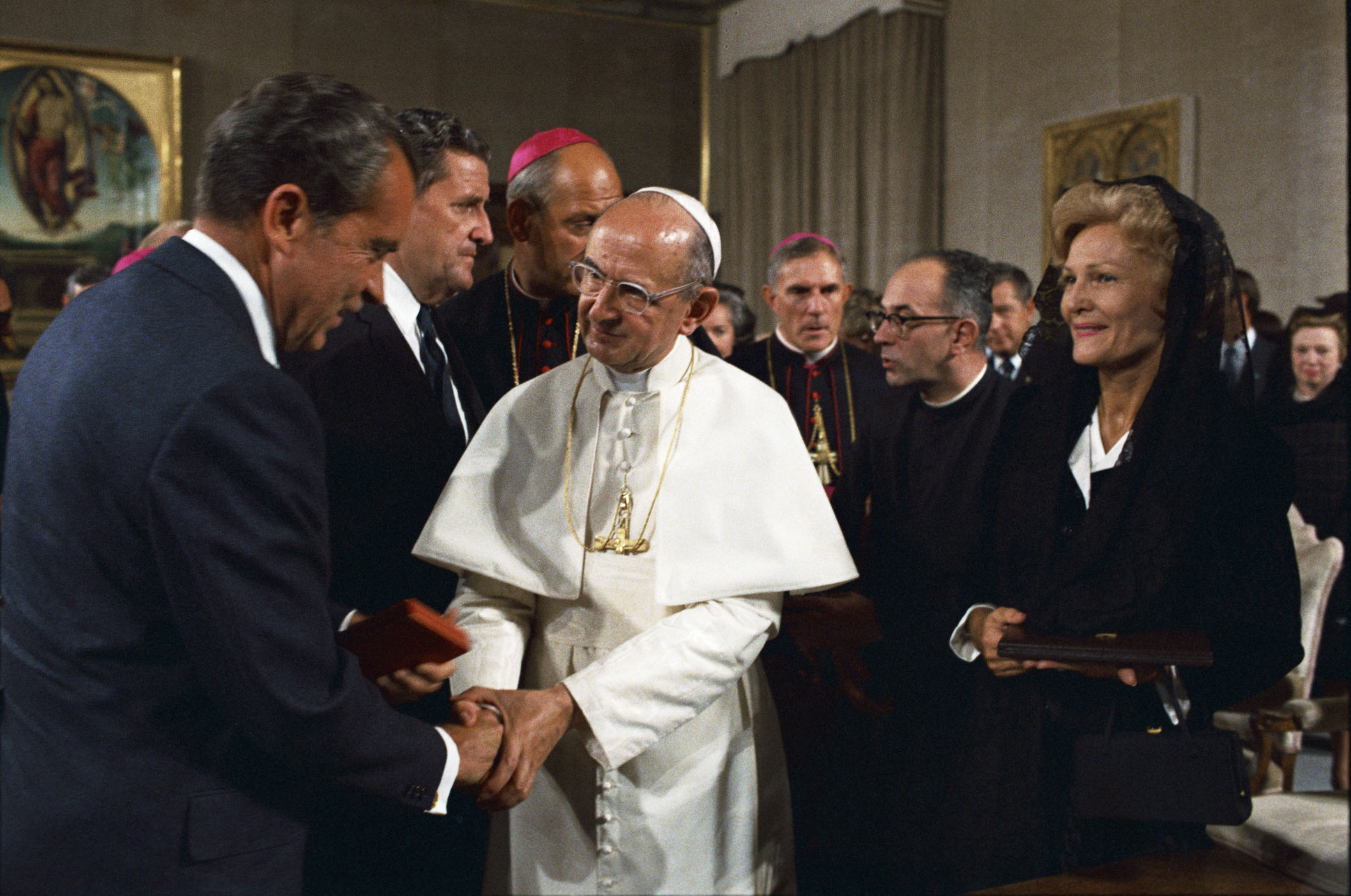
Richard Nixon shaking hands with Pope Paul VI

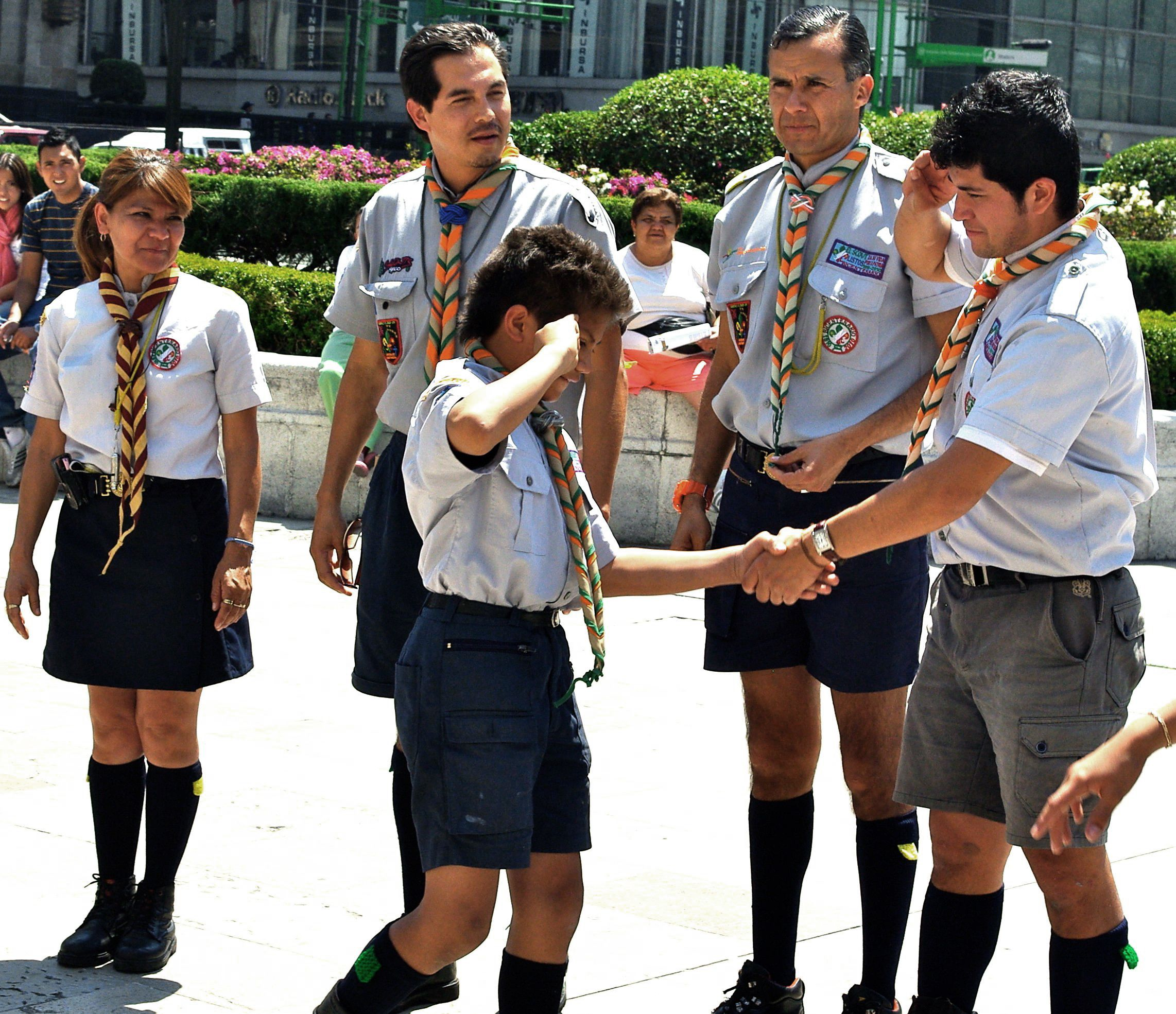
Leaders welcome a boy into Scouting, March 2010, Mexico City, Mexico. Note the left-handed handshake.

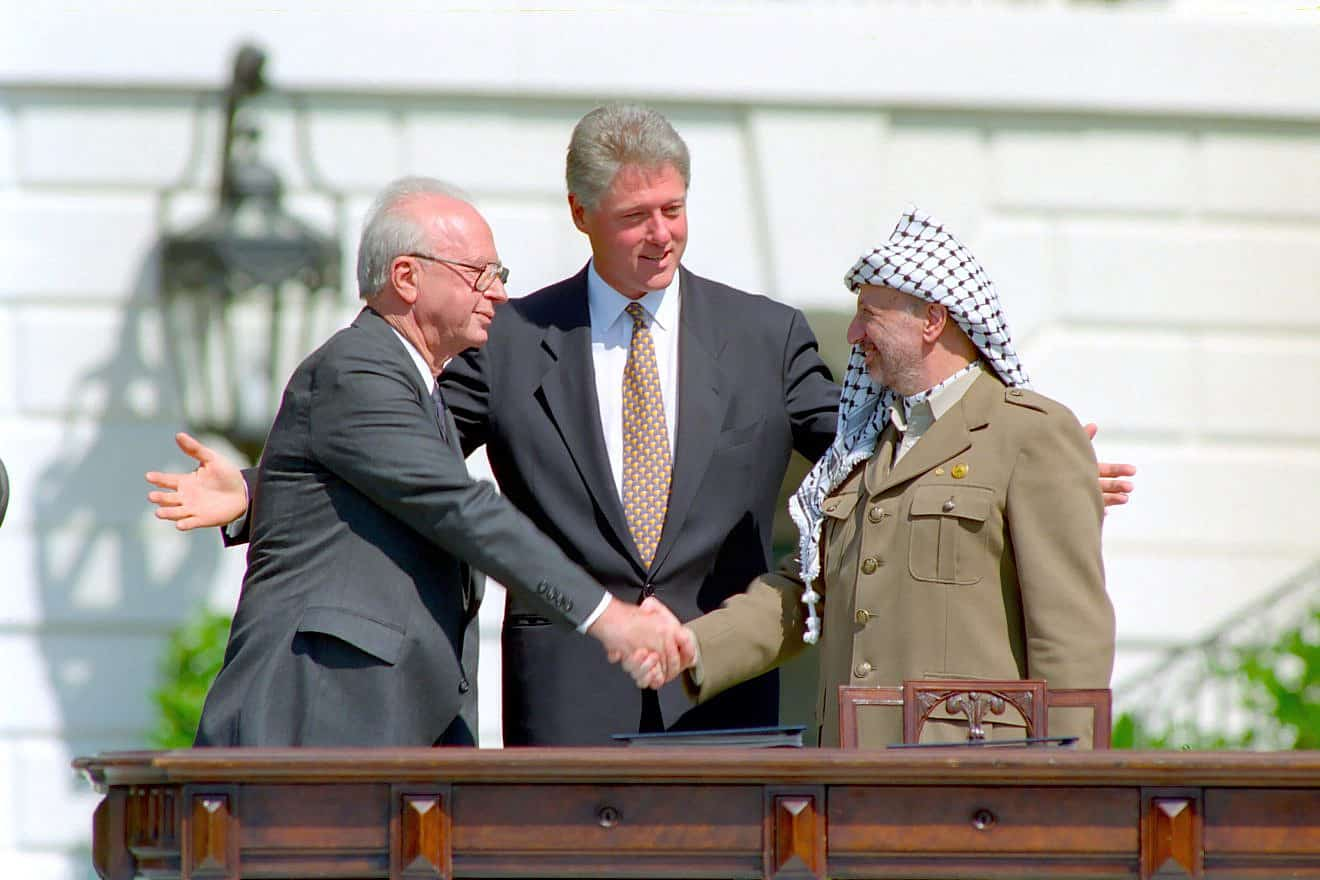
Israeli Prime Minister Yitzhak Rabin and Yasser Arafat making a historic handshake at the Oslo Accords signing ceremony on 13 September 1993 with U.S. President Bill Clinton looking on

=== By geographic location ===
- In Anglophone countries, handshaking is common in business situations. In casual non-business situations, men are more likely to shake hands than women.
- In the United States, United Kingdom and Canada, a traditional handshake is firm, executed with the right hand, with good posture and eye contact. A handshake where both parties are standing up is deemed as good etiquette.
- Austrians shake hands when meeting, often including with children.
- In the Netherlands and Belgium, handshakes are done more often, especially on meeting.
- In Denmark, the final step in acquiring Danish citizenship is a ceremony at which a handshake with a local official is specifically required (gloves may not be worn).
- In Norway, where a firm handshake is preferred, people most often shake hands when agreeing on deals, in private and business relations.
- In Russia, a handshake is performed between men and rarely performed by women.
- In Switzerland, it may be expected to shake the women's hands first.
- In Israel, handshakes are standard among Jews (with the exception of Orthodox Jews and Ultra Orthodox Jews where public handshaking between members of the opposite sex is frowned upon), but not among Palestinians or Israeli Arabs.
- In some countries such as Turkey or the Arabic-speaking Middle East, handshakes are not as firm as in the West. Consequently, a grip that is too firm is considered rude.
- Moroccans will give a soft handshake to someone of the same gender, along with one kiss on each cheek (lips don't touch the cheek unless they are family). The handshake may be followed by lightly touching one's heart with one's right hand.
- In Armenia, handshakes are the most common greetings between men, optionally followed by a kiss on the cheek if the two parties have a close relationship. Traditionally, a woman needs to wait for the man to present his hand for the handshake. Women usually greet each other with hugs and a kiss on the cheek.
- In China, age is considered important in handshake etiquette, and older people should be greeted with a handshake before others. A weak handshake is also preferred, but people shaking hands often hold on to each other's hands for an extended period after the initial handshake.
- In Japan, there is not a tradition of shaking hands and it is preferred to formally bow to each other (with hands open by their sides). Japanese people may greet foreigners with a handshake; foreigners are advised to let Japanese people initiate any handshakes, and a weak handshake is preferred. An exception are so-called handshake events.
- In Korea, a senior person will initiate a handshake, which is preferred to be weak. It is a sign of respect to grasp the right arm with the left hand when shaking hands. It is considered disrespectful to put the free hand in one's pocket while shaking hands. Bowing is the preferred and conventional way of greeting a person in Korea.
- In Thailand, handshaking is only done if the traditional wai is not offered. When a person offers a wai, placing their palms together at chest level and bowing, this is then returned, with men saying "Sawadee-krap" and women saying "Sawadee-kah" (both mean "Hello").
- In India and several nearby countries, the respectful Namaste gesture, sometimes combined with a slight bow, is traditionally used in place of handshakes. Handshakes are preferred in business and other formal settings.
- In some areas of Africa, handshakes are continually held to show that the conversation is between the two talking. If they are not shaking hands, others are permitted to enter the conversation.
- Masai men in Africa greet one another by a subtle touch of palms of their hands for a very brief moment of time.
- In Liberia, the snap handshake is customary in which the two shakers snap their fingers against each other at the conclusion of the handshake.
- In Ethiopia, it is considered rude to use the left hand during a handshake. While greeting the elderly or a person in authority, it is also customary to accompany the handshake with a bow and the left hand supporting the right.
- In Indonesia, it is considered rude to use one's left hand as it is a hand designated for unclean duties. A medium to soft handshake grip is sufficient, since gripping too hard could be considered rude or an act of aggression.

=== Other ===
- Related to a handshake but more casual, some people prefer a fist bump. Typically the fist bump is done with a clenched hand. Only the knuckles of the hand are typically touched to the knuckles of the other person's hand. Unlike the formality of a handshake, the fist bump is typically not used to seal a business deal or in formal business settings.
- The hand hug is a type of handshake popular with politicians, as it can present them as being warm, friendly, trustworthy and honest. This type of handshake involves covering the clenched hands with the remaining free hand, creating a sort of "cocoon".
- In the sport of fencing, after the Olga Kharlan handshaking incident in 2023, the International Fencing Federation changed its rules so that the previously required handshakes between fencers at the end of a bout would become optional, with a distance greeting permitted instead.
- In the sport of Brazilian jiu-jitsu, a specific greeting is generally expected to occur between wrestlers at the opening of the match. It consists of a simple slap of the palms or fingers, followed by a fist-bump. Whilst not generally included in explicit rulesets, it is commonly considered rude and unsportsmanlike not to execute a "slap-bump" before a match.

== Germ spreading ==
Do not handshake sign

Handshakes are known to spread a number of microbial pathogens. Certain diseases such as scabies are known to spread most frequently through direct skin-to-skin contact. A medical study has found that fist bumps and high fives spread fewer germs than handshakes. During the 2009 H1N1 pandemic, the dean of medicine at the University of Calgary, Tom Feasby, suggested that fist bumps may be a "nice replacement of the handshake" in an effort to prevent transmission of the virus.

Following a 2010 study that showed that only about 40% of doctors and other health care providers complied with hand hygiene rules in hospitals, Mark Sklansky, a doctor at UCLA hospital, decided to test "a handshake-free zone" as a method for limiting the spread of germs and reducing the transmission of disease. UCLA did not ban the handshakes outright, but rather suggested other options such as fist bumping, smiling, bowing, waving, and non-contact Namaste gestures. Other sources suggest raised brows, wai bow, two claps, hand over heart, sign language wave, or the shaka sign.

During the COVID-19 pandemic, several countries and organisations adopted policies encouraging people to use alternative modes of greeting instead of a handshake. Suggested alternatives included the elbow bump, the fist bump, foot tapping or non-contact actions for social distancing purposes, such as fist-and-palm or namaste gesture. Footshaking was also suggested.

== Chemosignaling ==
It has been discovered as a part of research at Israel's Weizmann Institute that human handshakes serve as a means of transferring social chemical signals between the shakers. It appears that there is a tendency to bring the shaken hands to the vicinity of the nose and smell them. They may serve an evolutionary need to learn about the person whose hand was shaken, replacing a more overt sniffing behavior, as is common among animals and in certain human cultures (such as Tuvalu, Greenland or rural Mongolia, where a quick sniff is part of the traditional greeting ritual).

== World records ==
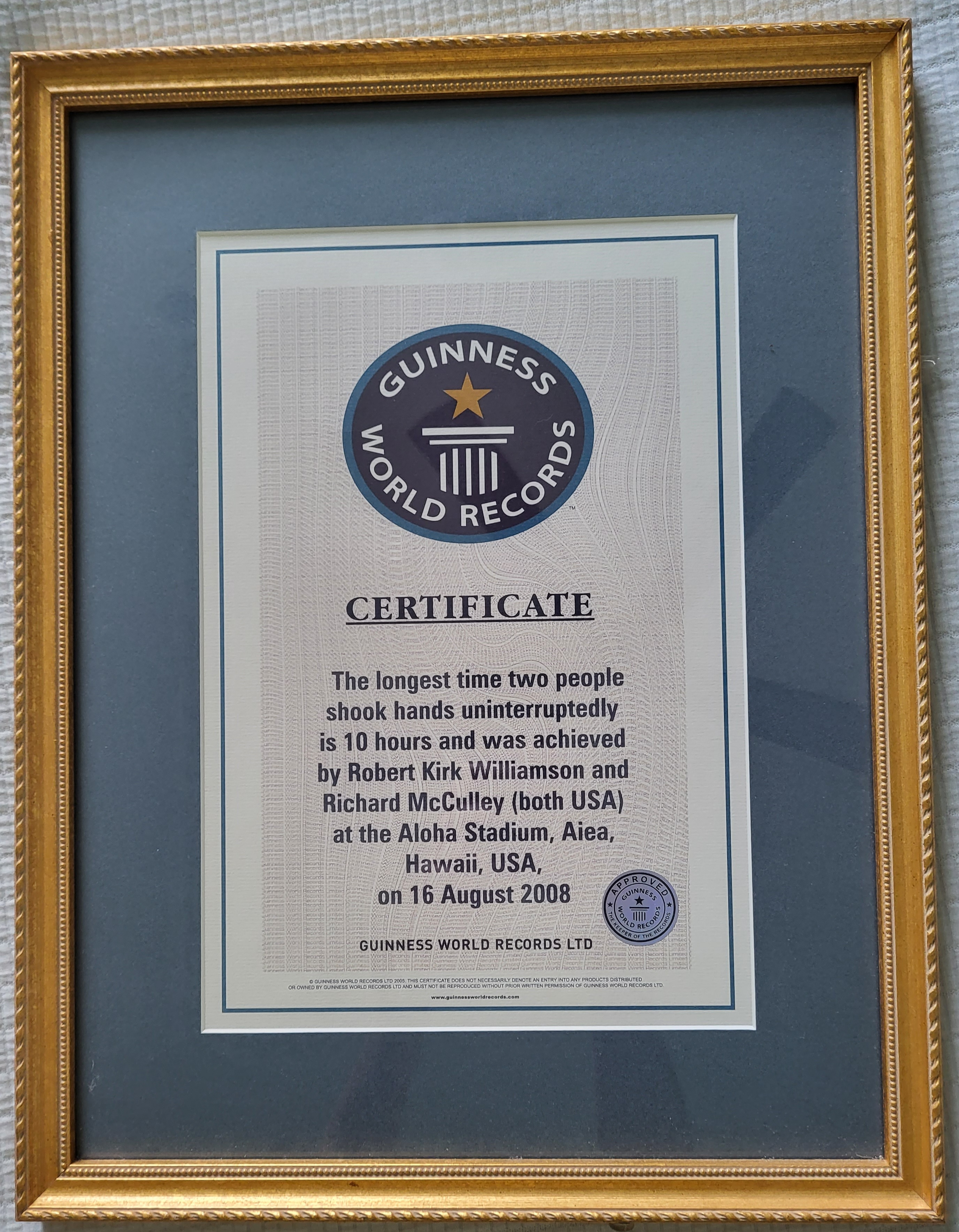
Certificate of Guinness World Records, 2008

In 1963, Lance Dowson shook 12,500 individuals' hands in 10 1/2 hours, in Wrexham, N. Wales. Atlantic City, New Jersey Mayor Joseph Lazarow was recognized by the Guinness Book of World Records for a July 1977 publicity stunt, in which the mayor shook more than 11,000 hands in a single day, breaking the record previously held by President Theodore Roosevelt, who had set the record with 8,510 handshakes at a White House reception on 1 January 1907.

On 27 May 2008, Kevin Whittaker and Cory Jens broke the Guinness World Record for the World's Longest Handshake (single hand) in San Francisco, California, by shaking hands for 9 hours and 30 minutes, besting the previous record of 9 hours and 19 minutes set in 2006. This record stood briefly until 16 August 2008 when Kirk Williamson and Richard McCulley were recognized by Guinness World Records for the longest time two people shook hands uninterruptedly for 10 hours at Aloha Stadium in Aiea, Hawaii. On 21 September 2009, Jack Tsonis and Lindsay Morrison then broke that record by shaking hands for 12 hours, 34 minutes and 56 seconds. Their record was broken less than a month later in Claremont, California, when John-Clark Levin and George Posner shook hands for 15 hours, 15 minutes, and 15 seconds. The next month, on 21 November, Matthew Rosen and Joe Ackerman surpassed this feat, with a new world record time of 15 hours, 30 minutes and 45 seconds.

At 8 p.m. EST on Friday 14 January 2011 a new attempt at the longest hand-shake commenced in New York City's Times Square and the existing record was broken by semi-professional world record-breaker Alastair Galpin.

On 29 January 2020, a new world record for the longest handshaking relay was set by approximately 1,817 people in Abu Dhabi, United Arab Emirates, at Umm Al Emarat Park in an event organized by the Abu Dhabi Police to celebrate the 1 year anniversary of the signing of the Document on Human Fraternity for World Peace and Living Together in the city.

== See also ==
- Dap greeting
- Golden handshake
- Greeting habits
- Handshake Man
- Holding hands
- Scout handshake
- Secret handshake
- Transmission (medicine)
