= Fist bump =

Celebratory or greeting gesture

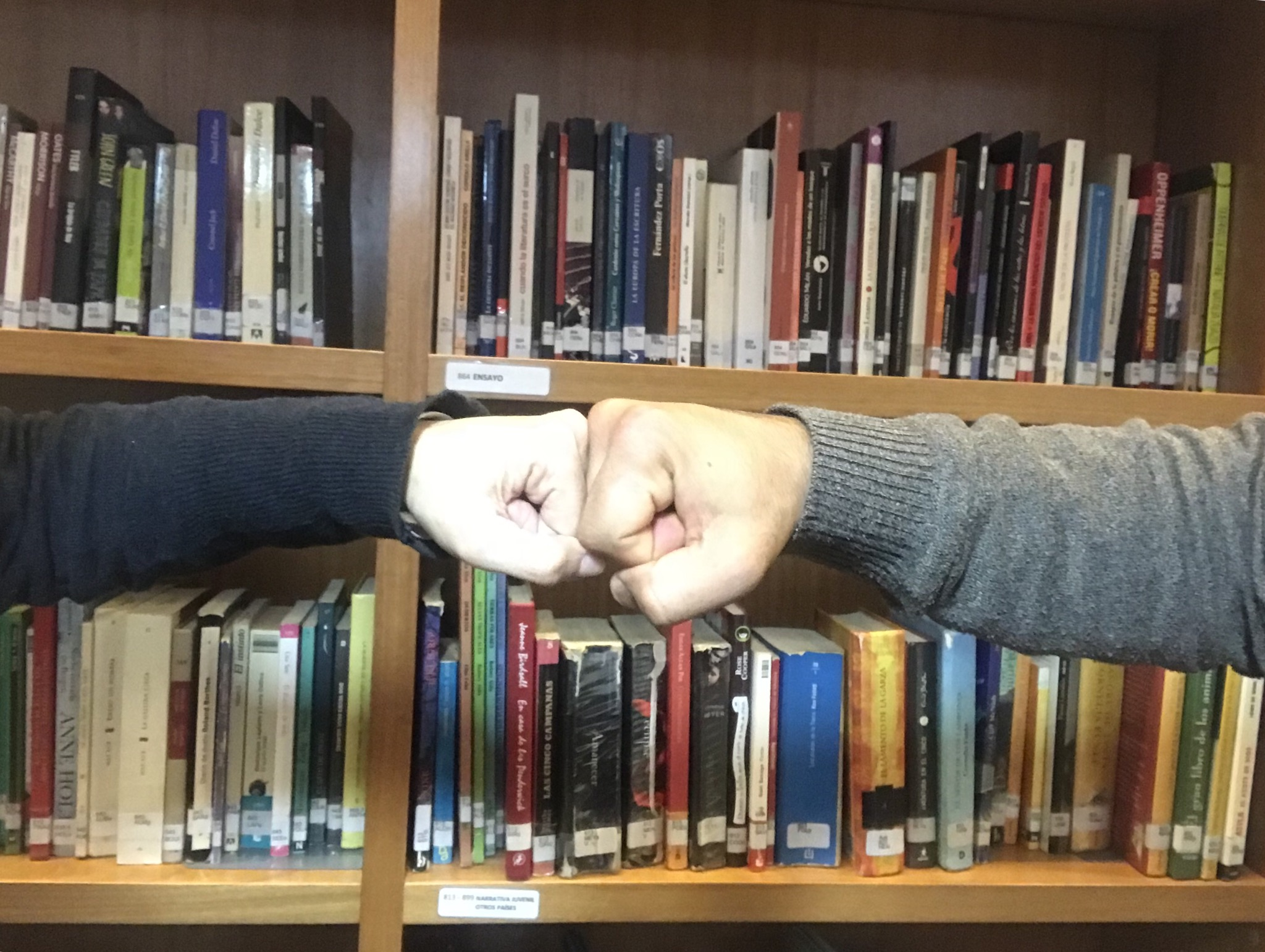
Close-up of a fist bump

Fist bump animation

A fist bump, also known as a bro fist, a power five, a spud, or a safe, is a gesture similar in meaning to a handshake or high five. A fist bump can also be a symbol of giving respect or approval, as well as companionship between two people. It can be followed by various other hand and body gestures and may be part of a dap greeting. It is commonly used in sports as a form of celebration with teammates and with opposition players at the beginning or end of a game. Fist bumps are often given as a form of friendly congratulation.

== Definition ==
A fist bump is a gesture in which two people bump their fists together (as in greeting or celebration).

Celebration with a fist bump

The gesture is performed when two participants each form a closed fist with one hand and then lightly tap the front of their fists together. A participant's fists may be either vertically oriented (perpendicular to the ground) or horizontally oriented. Unlike the standard handshake, which is typically performed only with each participant's right hand, a fist bump may be performed with participants using either hand.

== History ==
The "fist bump" or "pound" in European history can be traced to boxers instructed to touch gloves at the start of a contest. Likewise, dart players bump fists that are clutching pointed mini-arrows.

Baseball Hall of Famer Stan Musial used the fist bump during the 1950–60s as an alternative to shaking hands. Musial was convinced that he was catching too many colds by picking up germs while shaking thousands of hands each year, so he adopted the fist bump as a friendly alternative.

The modern gesture may have arisen spontaneously on city basketball courts, and was popularized by basketball player Fred Carter in the 1970s.

Others trace the gesture to the Wonder Twins, minor characters in the 1970s Hanna-Barbera superhero cartoon Super Friends, who touched knuckles and cried "Wonder Twin powers, activate!"

Smithsonian researcher LaMont Hamilton suggests that the dap originated during the Vietnam War as a modified form of the Black Power salute, which was prohibited by the U.S. military.

The fist bump was seen in Australia in September 1990 at the Wetherill Park Indoor Cricket Centre between two opening batsmen, Mick Tyler and Bob Minney. At the completion of the first successful batting over for the pair, they met mid-pitch and fist bumped with their batting gloves. They continued to fist bump for the remainder of the game and it continued into the future. Now this act can be seen on various sporting fields/arenas around Australia, and it is now commonly practiced at an international level; many international cricketers fist bump in between overs or as congratulations after a six has been hit.

Fist bumping behavior has also been observed in chimpanzees, according to a book written by Margaret Power in 1991.

In June 2008, Fox News anchor E.D. Hill controversially asked whether a fist bump between then-presidential candidate Barack Obama and his wife Michelle was a "terrorist fist jab". Hill apologized the next day, and her show was cancelled the next week and her contract not renewed.

In light of the 2009 H1N1 pandemic, the Dean of Medicine at the University of Calgary, Tom Feasby, suggested that the fist bump may be a "nice replacement of the handshake" in an effort to prevent transmission of the virus. Similarly, a medical study has found that fist bumps and high fives spread fewer germs than handshakes.

The COVID-19 pandemic has made the fist bump a common greeting, as shaking hands was discouraged to slow the spread of the virus.

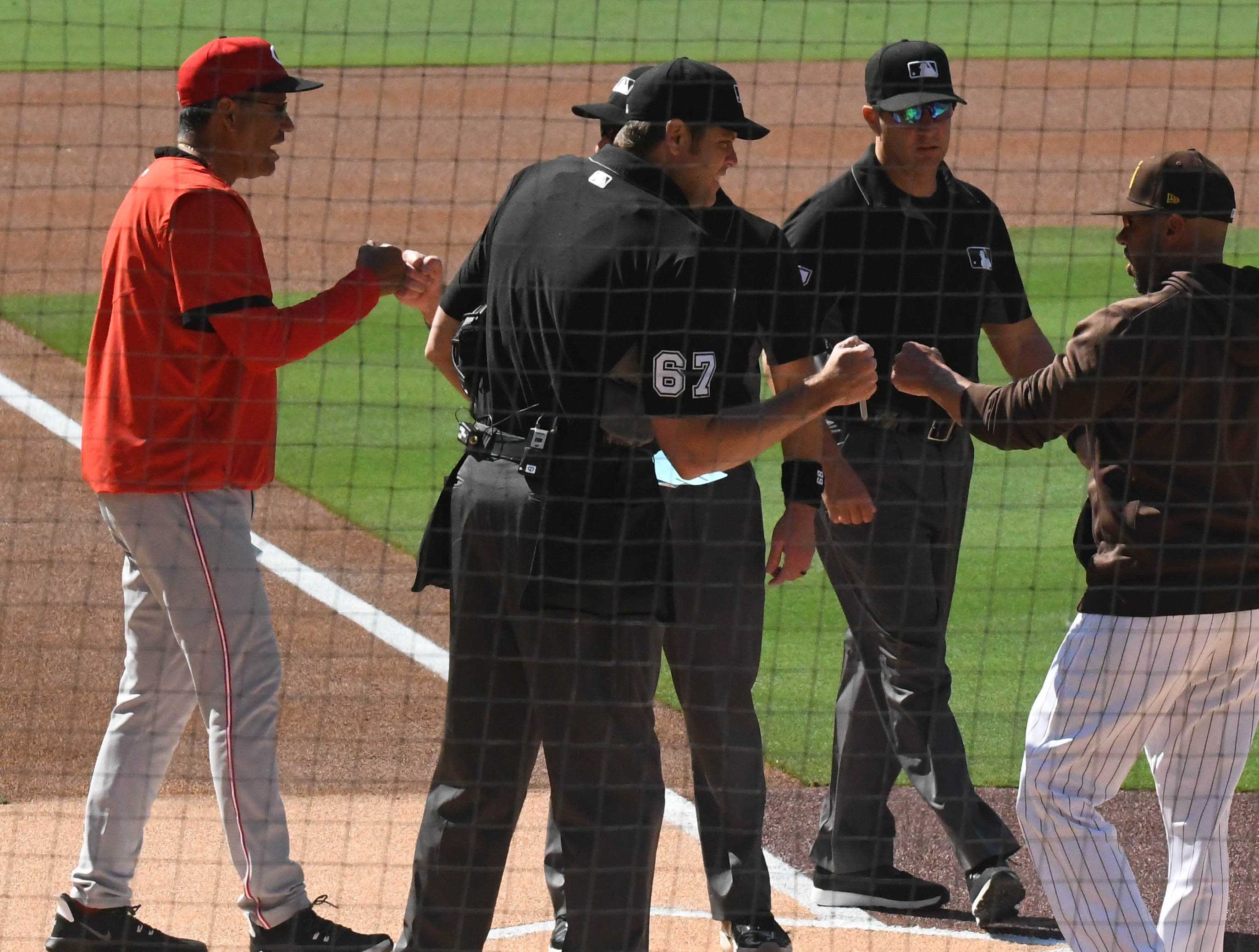
San Diego Padres manager Jayce Tingler and Cincinnati Reds bench coach Freddie Benavides greet umpires with fist bumps prior to a game in 2021.

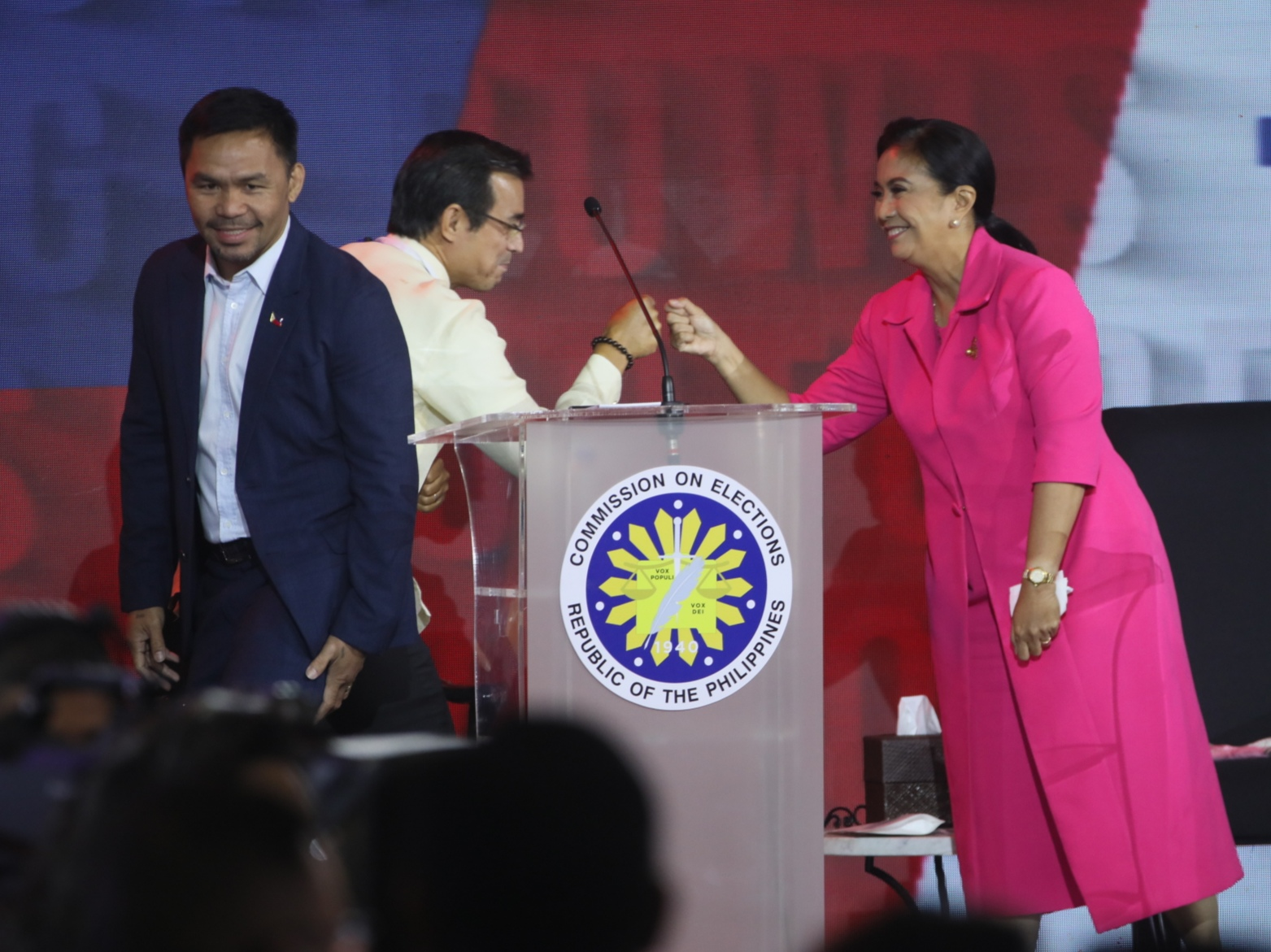
Filipino politicians Isko Moreno and Leni Robredo bump fists before participating in one of the 2022 Philippine presidential debates.

== Hygiene ==
A 2014 article in the American Journal of Infection Control documented that the fist bump and high five reduced the transfer of bacteria compared to the handshake. The study found that the size of the area of contact correlated with how much bacteria was transferred. High fives transferred around 50% as much as handshakes, and fist bumps significantly less.
