= Etiquette in Indonesia =

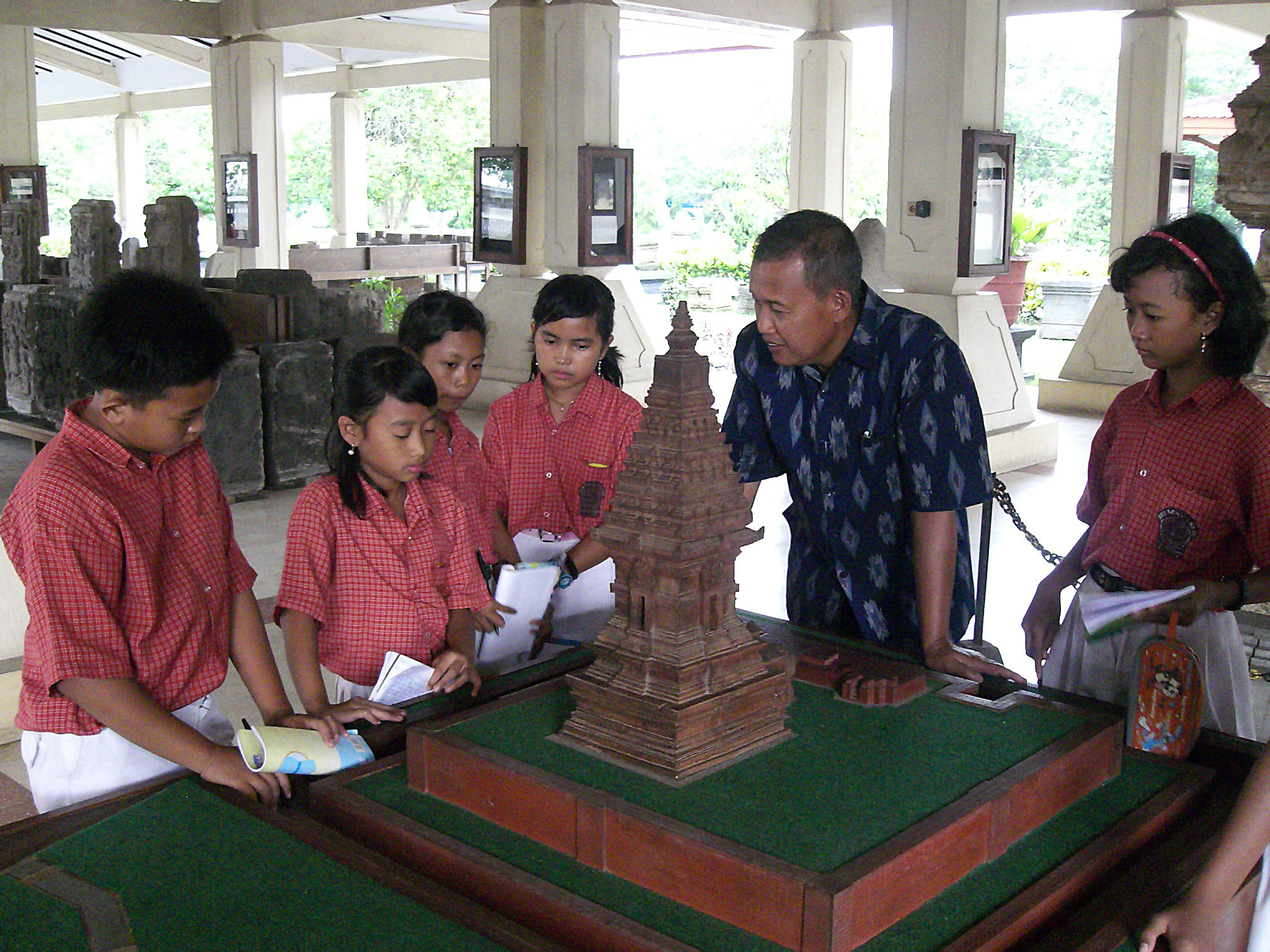
Paying respect to elders and obeying the teacher are expected among Asian youngsters, such as shown here in Indonesia. The students are quietly listening to their teacher's explanation during a school museum excursion.

Various codes of etiquette in Indonesia govern the expectations of social behavior in the country and are considered very important. Etiquette demonstrates respect and is a key factor in social interactions. Like many social cultures, etiquette varies greatly depending on one's status relative to the person in question. Some conventions may be region-specific, and thus may not exist in all regions of Indonesia. The following are generally accepted contemporary customs in Indonesia.

== Cultural overview ==
Indonesia is a vast tropical country of sprawling archipelago with extremely diverse culture and demographic make-up with over 600 ethnic groups, and speaking more than 700 living languages. Indonesia has the largest Muslim population in the world. Indonesia also has considerably significant numbers of Christian Protestant and Catholics population, also Hindu that mostly inhabit the island of Bali, and Buddhist that are mostly Chinese Indonesians. In some remote areas, tribal animism still survives.

Each of these Indonesian ethnic groups has its own culture and tradition and may speak their own mother language. Each of them may adhere to different religions that have their own rules and customs. These combinations made Indonesia a complex mixture of traditions that may differ from one place to another. Some ethnic groups such as the Javanese have a complex set of etiquette behaviors and are rather constrained in expressing their true feelings, while others, such as Batak and Betawi people, are more open and straightforward. Nevertheless, there are some similarities and common traits that can be used as a guide to interact with Indonesians. It is widely felt however, that the highly refined social behaviour of the Javanese as the majority — more or less — sets the social standards throughout the country.

== Common values and practices ==
=== Smile ===
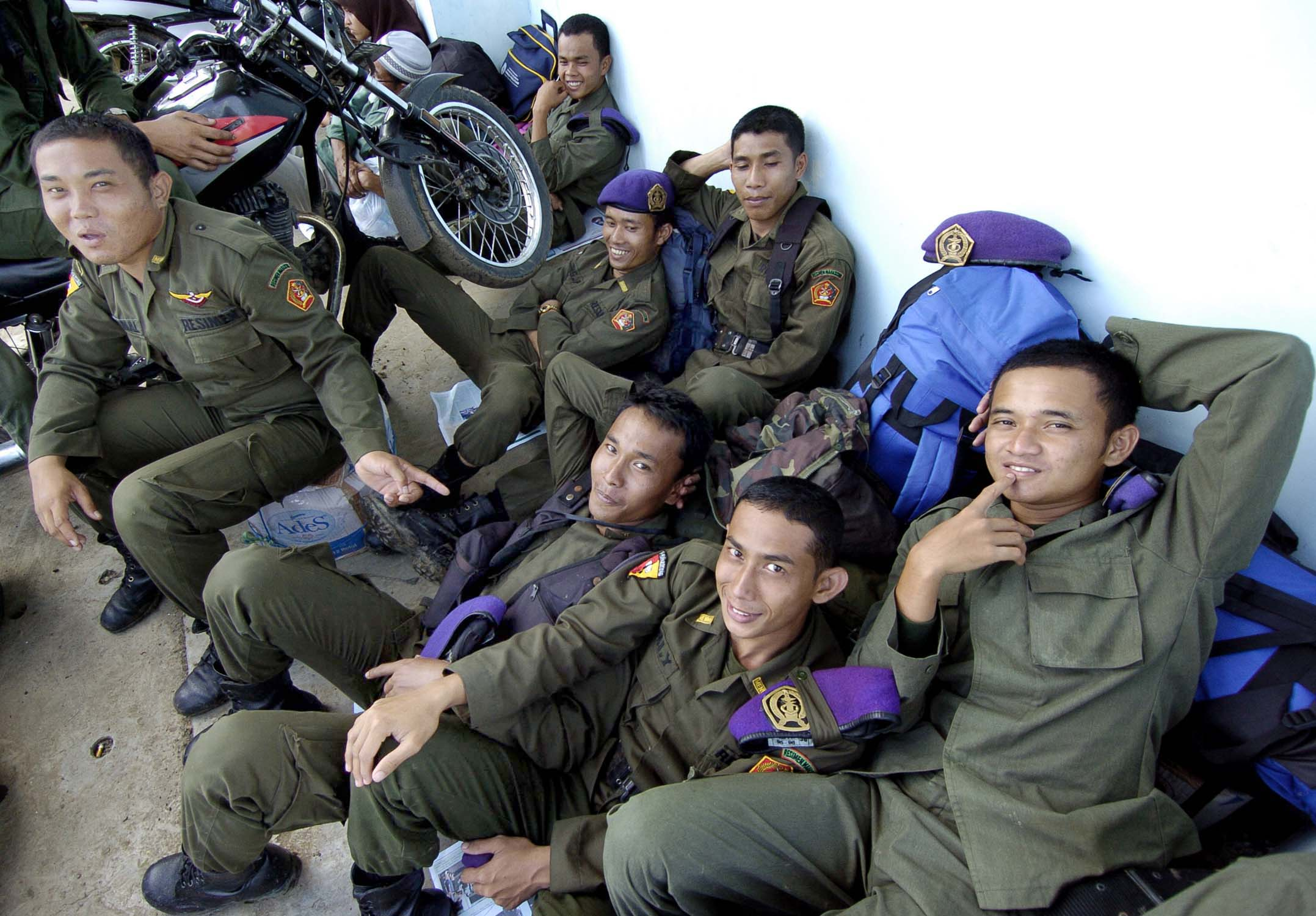
Most Indonesians initiate social contact with a smile, it is a sign that you are approachable, such as shown here by the Student Regiment personnel in Aceh.

Indonesians smile a lot to initiate contact and often smile back in return. When interacting with other people, one should avoid expressing negative air of resentment, arrogance or hostility. Smiling, even toward strangers that you are interacting with, or someone that accidentally met your eyes, is considered polite and could be a social ice-breaker and to sign that you are approachable.

=== Communality ===
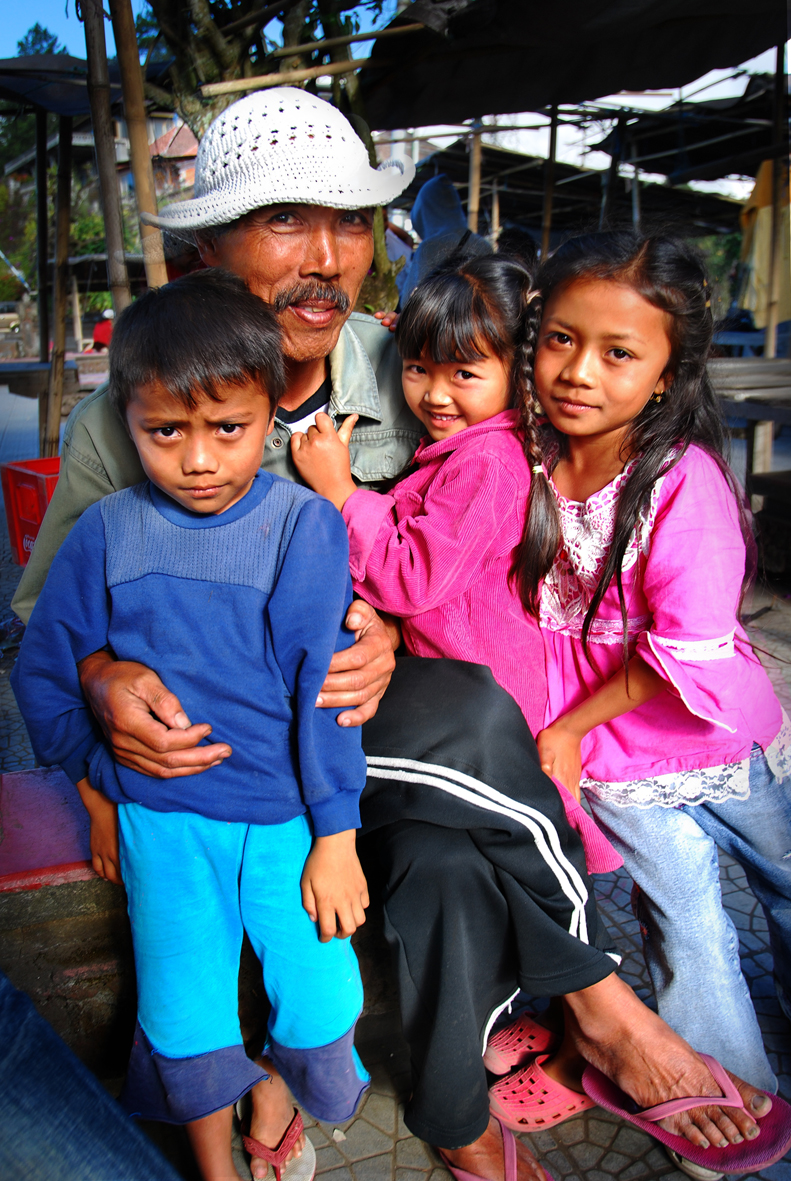
Indonesians are family and community oriented, where loving and honoring elders is a norm.

Indonesians are family and community oriented. Several ethnic groups have such tight knit relationships that its members are expected to be involved actively in many of their community events. Social harmony and the spirit of cooperation is nurtured, as embodied in the tradition of decision by consensus (musyawarah-mufakat), and the long-established pattern of mutual assistance (gotong-royong). Senior is expected to make group decisions, although Indonesians are advocates of group discussion and consensus. This ties back to the idea of maintaining strong group cohesiveness and harmonious relationships. Individualism, especially among traditional community is considered arrogance and shunned upon. Politeness as well as respect, modesty and loyalty, is prevalent in the culture.

=== Hierarchy and honoring the elder ===
As with most group-oriented cultures, hierarchy plays a very great role in Indonesian culture. It is important to observe that in Indonesia everyone has a status, no one is equal, and status is situational. This hierarchical relationships are respected, emphasized and maintained. Respect is usually shown to those with status, power, position, and age. Failure to demonstrate proper respect, would be deemed as kurang ajar (Indonesian for "lack of education or teaching") to denote the lack of good manners.

Elders are respected through performing salim, which is a revering handshake by touching the back of the hand to the forehead. For example, when shaking the hand with older persons, such as parents, grandparents and teachers, the younger people or students are expected to touch the back of the elder's palm with the tip of their nose or forehead, this reflects a special respect from the young to the old. This salim gesture is similar to hand-kissing, with exception it is only tip of nose or forehead that touch the hand, not the lips. This can be seen in both the village and families.

The ritualized gesture of asking for forgiveness, paying respect and honoring the elders is the sungkem gesture. It is the utmost gesture of respect in Javanese and Sundanese tradition, mostly performed between parents and children. The parents place their hands on their laps and the children hold their parents hands and bow deep to put their nose in their parents hands, almost placing one's head upon the elder's lap. Ritualized sungkem often performed in wedding or during Lebaran or Hari Raya Eid al Fitr.

=== Indirectness ===
Most Indonesians value social harmony dearly, so direct confrontation is generally avoided. With such eagerness to avoid confrontation, indirectness would mostly become the norm. Indonesians go to great lengths to avoid unpleasantness, bad news or direct rejection. A socially refined Indonesian would go to elegant lengths to avoid directly saying "no". with the Indonesian language containing twelve ways to says "no" and six ways to says "please", this describes the complexity of social interaction and manners in Indonesia. Today however in the relatively new atmosphere of democracy, expressing disagreement, performing demonstrations, and arguing in open debate are becoming more publicly acceptable.

=== Saving face ===
Saving one's face means considering others' dignity and avoiding situations that may cause shame or humiliation. Openly airing your displeasure at certain circumstances would be considered disrespectful. In the event that you are disgruntled or angry with a person, the matter typically discussed privately. This way you are allowing them to ‘save face’ and maintain their social standing.

== Everyday Manners ==
=== Greetings ===
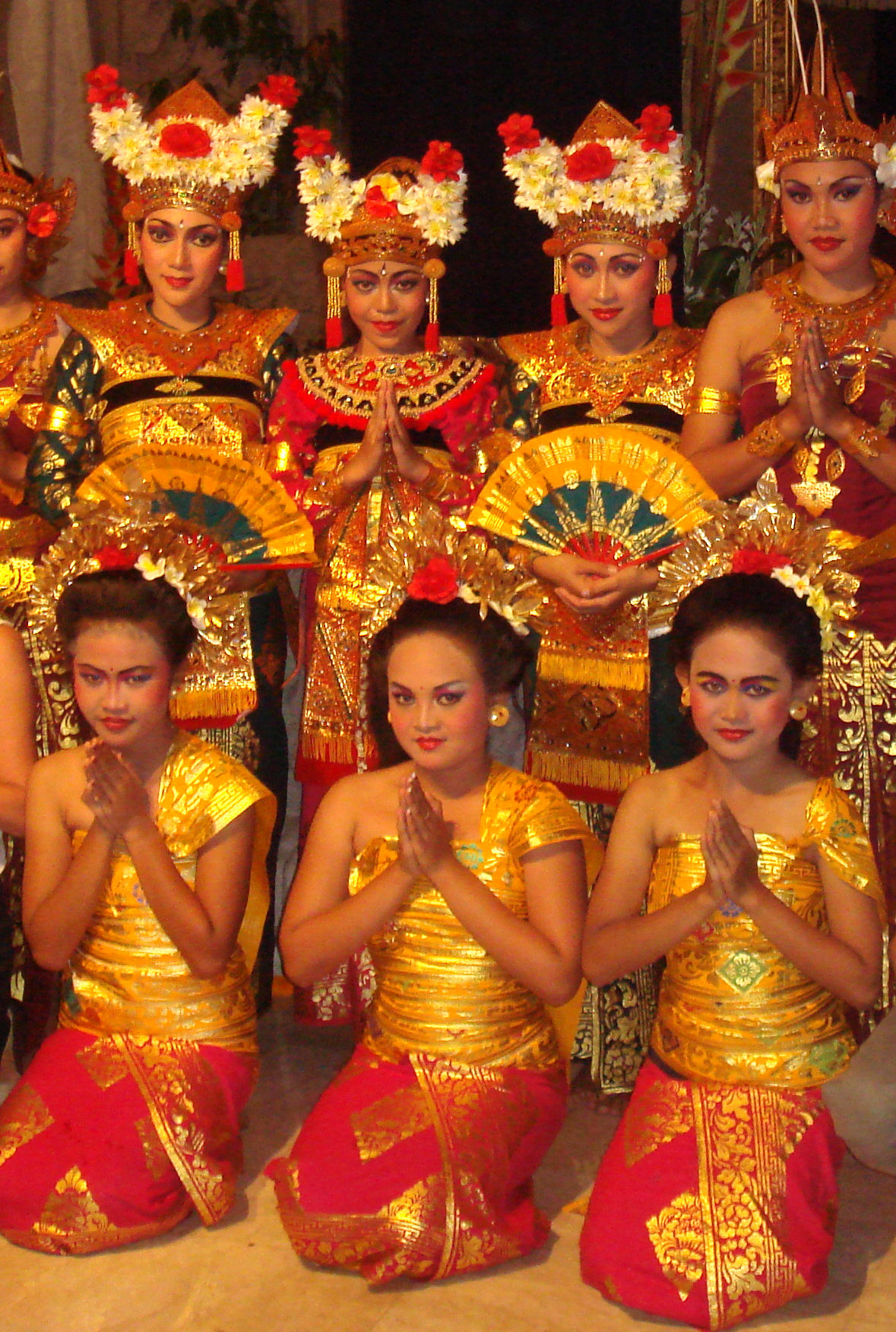
Balinese traditionally greets in Añjali Mudrā, a Hindu heritage in Indonesian culture.

Greetings in local Indonesian includes selamat pagi (good morning), selamat siang (good afternoon), or selamat malam (good evening), and apa kabar? (how are you?). Saying terima kasih (thank you) after receiving services or favours demonstrate good manner.

When greeting or introducing oneself, smiling, handshake (salam) and slightly nod is a good gesture. A medium to soft handshake grip is sufficient, since gripping too hard could be considered rude or an act of aggression. Indonesians may not shake hand as firmly as their Western counterparts. Salam is also a standard greeting between Muslims, and it would perhaps be considered polite to follow this form of salutation. Generally in salam, the equivalent of the handshake is to offer both hands and gently touch your counterpart’s extended hands, before finally bringing one’s hands back to the chest to demonstrate that you welcome from the heart.

In certain cultures with significant Hindu-Buddhist heritage such as Bali, Java and Lombok — it is common to perform sembah; to greet by clasped two hands together in front of the chest while slightly bowing. Traced to Dharmic Añjali Mudrā, it is the same as Indian namaste, Thai wai and Cambodian sampeah gesture, and preferred especially among Sundanese, Javanese, and Balinese people.

=== Using hands ===
Both the Muslim and Hindu faiths somewhat abhor the use of the left hand. It is considered 'unclean'; the left hand is traditionally perceived as the hand used to clean yourself in the toilet. So when shaking hands, offering a gift, handing or receiving something, eating, pointing or generally touching another person, it is considered proper etiquette to always use your right hand.

Pointing toward someone with forefinger is considered rude. While pointing with the whole open palm or just a thumb (with other fingers folded) are considered most polite. Pointing direction by doing smooth and graceful motion with your chin is quite acceptable, except a sharp and strong movement, which is not polite and considered as an insult.

=== Table manner ===
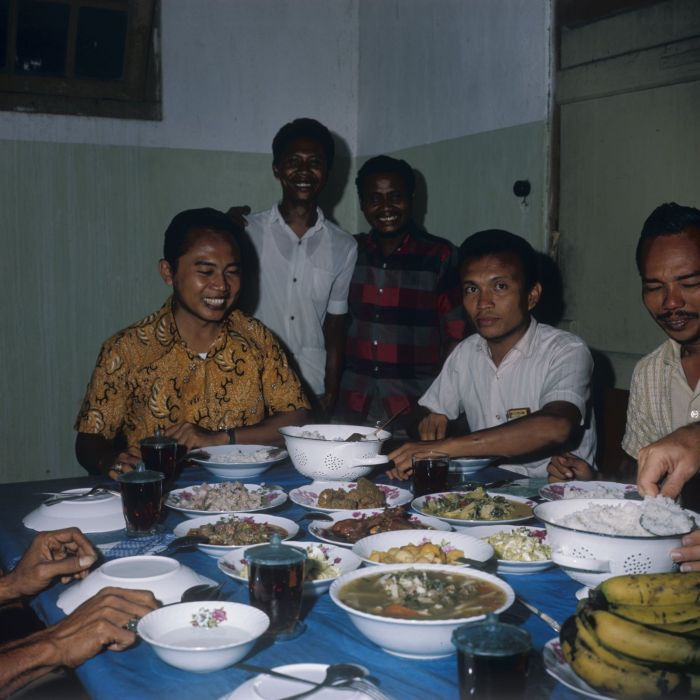
A banquet in Indonesia, the table top is filled with bowls and plates of steamed rice and various dishes.

Indonesian traditional meals usually consists of steamed rice as staple, surrounded by vegetables and soup and meat or fish side dishes. In a typical family meal, the family members gather around the table filled with steamed rice and several other dishes. Each dish is placed in a separate communal large plate or in bowls. Each of these dishes has its own serving spoons, used only to take parts of the dishes from the communal plate into one's own personal plate. Each of the family members has their own personal plate that is first filled with steamed rice.

During a dinner or luncheon invitation, the oldest man, most senior family member, or the honored host, has the right to initiate the meal, followed by the rest of the family and guests to help themselves to the dishes. Each of them take some portion of dishes from the communal plates into their own individual plates. On their personal plate, the steamed rice will soon be surrounded by two, three or more dishes; vegetables and fish or meat, and maybe some fried dishes, sambal and krupuk. Indonesian meals are commonly eaten with the combination of a spoon in the right hand and fork in the left hand to push the food onto the spoon. Knife however, is absent from dining table, thus most of the ingredients such as vegetables and meat are already cut into bite-size pieces prior to cooking.

In many parts of the country, it is quite common to eat with one's bare hands. In traditional restaurants or households that commonly use bare hands to eat, such as Sundanese and Padang restaurants, they usually serve kobokan, a bowl of tap water with a slice of lime in it to give a fresh scent. This bowl of water should not be consumed, rather it is used to wash one's hand before and after eating. In some restaurants, one may be required to share a table; yet involving in conversation with strangers that shares table is not necessary, a smile and a slight nod during initiate contact is sufficient. Usually the one who does the inviting pays the bill, while going Dutch is not common and often considered as a poor form, though younger people and teenagers often do this.

Indonesia is a Muslim majority country, so a majority of Indonesians observe halal dietary law which prohibits the consumption of pork and alcohol. During the days of Ramadhan, one should refrain from eating in front of a Muslim colleague, or avoid inviting them to join for a meal, as Muslims typically fast and refrain from drinking and smoking during the day.

== Dress sense ==
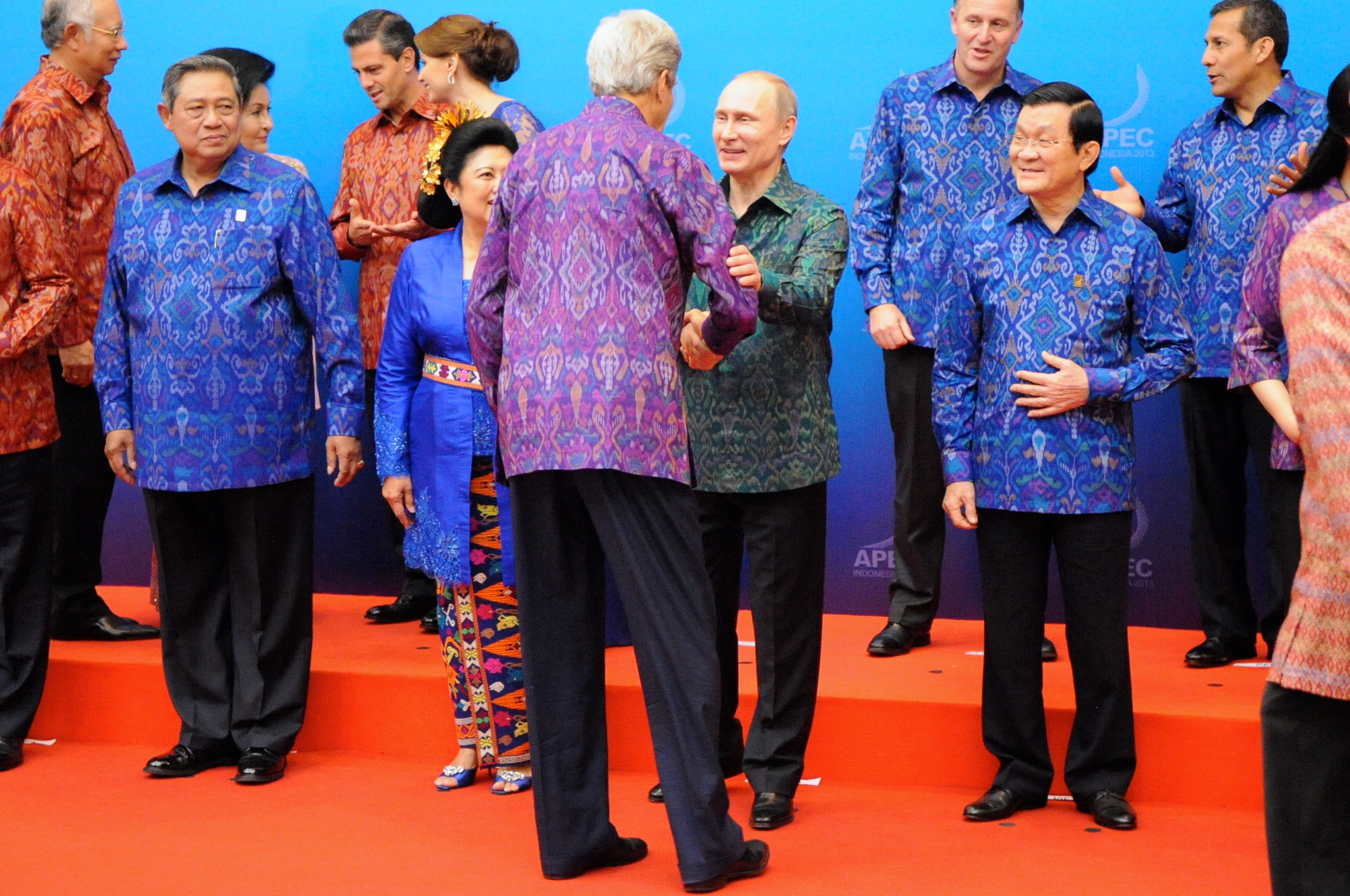
Wearing modest long-sleeved dress for women, batik shirt or other traditional Indonesian fabrics shirt for men are recommended to attend formal occasions in Indonesia.

Overall, conservative and modest dress sense are adopted in Indonesia, however it might differ from one place to another. For example, Aceh that adopt Sharia law are more strict and conservative compared to Bali. Shorts, strapless or sleeveless tops are considered only suitable for sports or worn in private, and are not usually worn in public.

=== Business ===
Business dress code are pretty much the same as international standard. Most of Indonesian offices are air conditioned, so the heat is not a problem on wearing suits indoor. When in Indonesia, by and large a conservative and modest dress sense should be adopted — especially by women. Skirt hemlines should fall below the knee and the shoulders should always be covered. Business attire is generally conservative. Women should dress conservatively ensuring that they are well covered from ankle to neck.

=== Formal events ===
Attending ceremonies, dinner parties, wedding receptions or official events wearing international standard dress-code are acceptable, such as to wear suit, shirt and trousers for men and modest dress for women. Wearing long-sleeved batik shirt for men and long-sleeved batik dress for women is acceptable for most formal occasions.

=== Visiting sacred sites ===
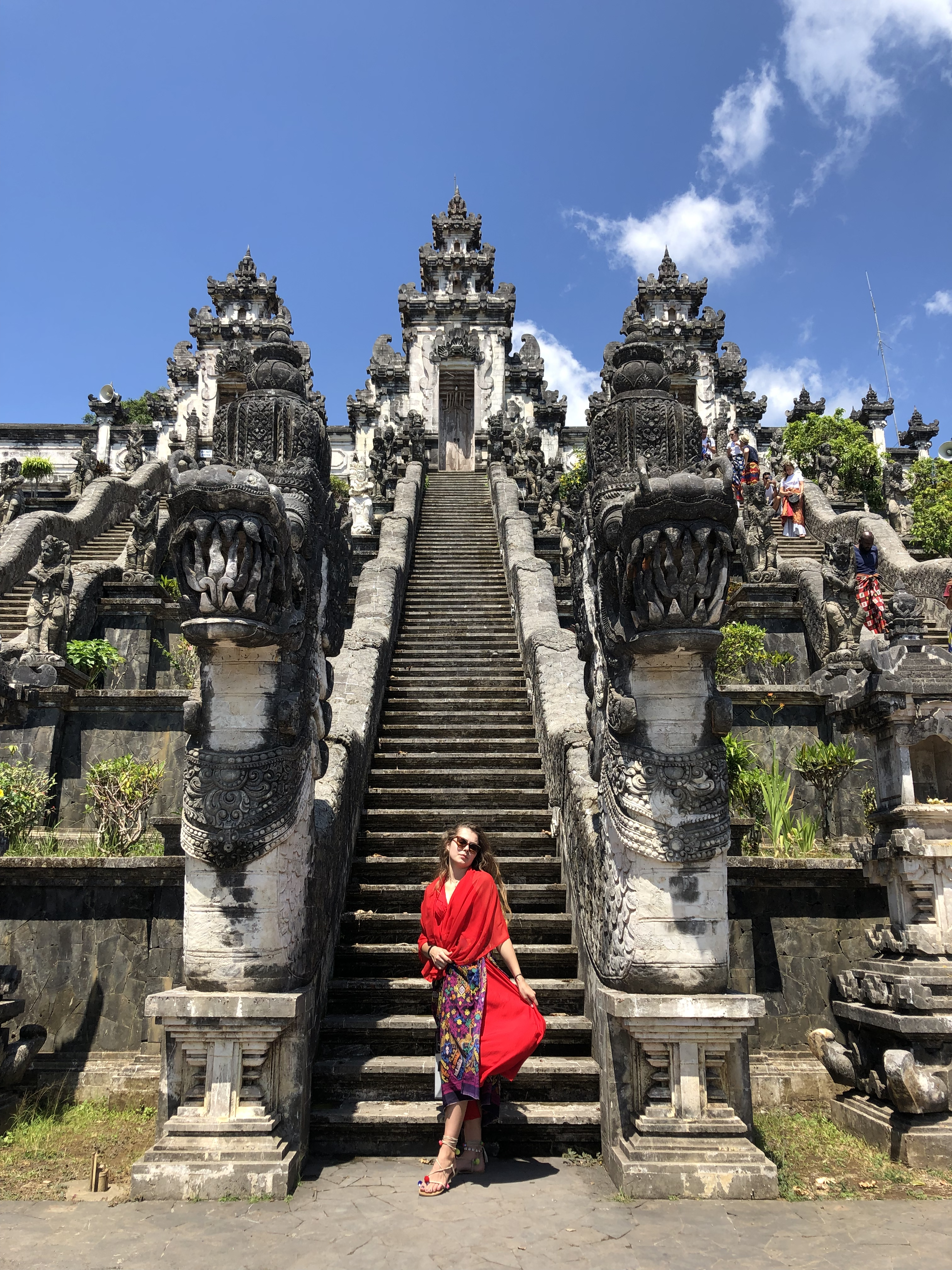
Some sacred places are open for visitors. However, proper dress etiquette is required, such as wearing sarong to visit Balinese temples.

Attending religious events or visiting religious sites requires utmost care. When visiting a place of worship, such as candi and pura (temples), mosques, and churches, the proper dress etiquette for such places is of utmost importance — modest dress is required. In temples, for example, shorts or mini skirts are not allowed, thus visitors are required to wear sarongs to cover their lower parts. Sleeveless clothes (or other attire which exposes one's shoulders) are prohibited — thus, clothes covering shoulders is required. Some non-religious sites such as keratons (palaces) and some museums may require modest dress, almost similar to religious sites.

Shoes or any form of footwear should be removed when entering a mosque. All visitors should ensure their attire covers as much skin as possible; women are also required to cover their heads. Likewise, removing shoes and dressing modestly is also expected when visiting Balinese Hindu temples. If wishing to visit a place of worship, it should be confirmed prior to entry whether the particular shrine, temple, mosque, or church is open to touristic visits or the curious.
