= Sampeah =

Cambodian greeting

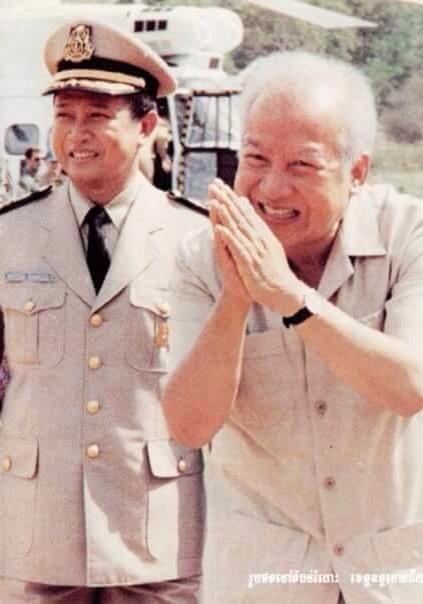
King Norodom Sihanouk (right) greeting with a sampeah

Sampeah (Khmer: សំពះ, sâmpeăh [sɑmˈpĕəh]) is a Cambodian greeting or a way of showing respect. Sampeah is based on the Indian Añjali Mudrā used in namasté. Pranāma or Namaste, the part of ancient Indian culture and rites has propagated to Southeast Asia, which was part of Indosphere of Greater India, through the spread of Hinduism and Buddhism from India.

While performing the sampeah, the person places their palms together in a prayer-like fashion while bowing slightly. The word often spoken with the sampeah when greeting somebody is ជម្រាបសួរ chumréab suŏr (pronounced [cum.riəp suə]), while ជម្រាបលា chumréab léa (pronounced [cum.riəp liə]) is spoken when saying goodbye.

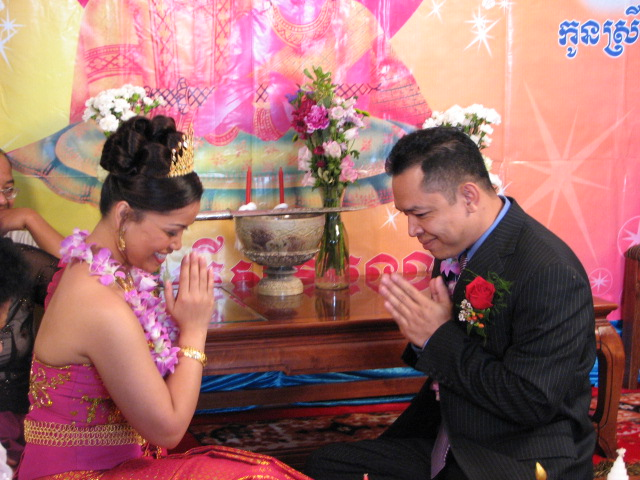
A couple doing a sampeah

Although the Sampeah is a form of greeting, it is also a common way to say thanks or apologize and is an important part of Khmer culture which is heavily influenced by Indian Hindu/Buddhist culture. There are different ways of bowing when performing the Sampeah. When praying to the Buddha (who founded Buddhism in India), the person places their palms together close to their face and brings their hands toward the ground three times. Just like Indian Añjali Mudrā namasté, it is also important when one Sampeahs to elders. The higher the hands and the lower the bow, the more respect is shown. It is a sign of respect and politeness.

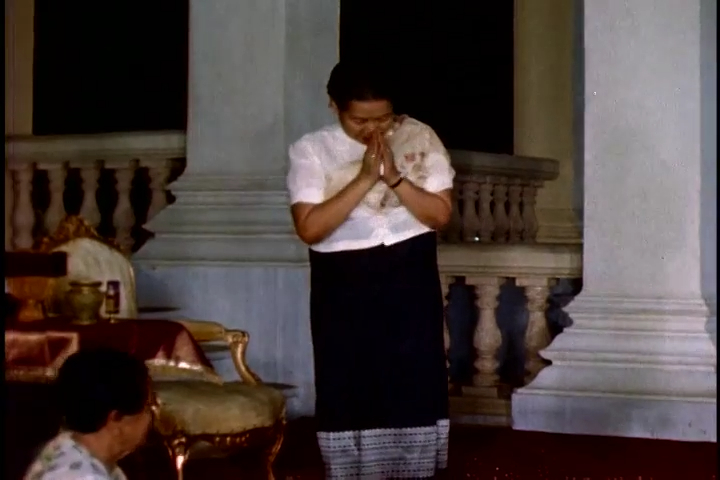
Queen Sisowath Kossamak doing a sampeah to her audience after a ceremony

== See also ==
- Anussati
- Culture of Cambodia
- Gadaw
- Mingalaba
- Namasté
- Phuang malai
- Puja
- Sembah
- Wai
