= Pādodaka =

Holy water

Pādodaka (Sanskrit: पादोदक, lit. foot-water) is holy water. Its prepared from bathing the Linga. It is one of the Ashtavarana or the 'eight protections' of Lingayatism.

This holy water is used in many sacred occasions to call upon good fortune and celestial blessing. It is sprinkled across while entering into a new house, on the newly bought vehicle etc.

== See also ==
- Añjali Mudrā
- Buddhist prayer beads
- Culture of India
- Guru-shishya tradition
- Hindu prayer beads
- Indian honorifics
- Mala
- Mudras
- Namaste
- Pranāma
- Puja (Hinduism)
