= Eight virtues =

Eight virtues may refer to:

- The eight virtues of the Four Cardinal Principles and Eight Virtues as enumerated by Chinese political philosopher Sun Yat-sen
- The eight virtues of Bushidō defined by Nitobe Inazō
- The Ashtavaranas, or eight virtues, of Lingayatism
- The eight virtues of the role-playing video game Ultima IV: Quest of the Avatar
- The eight heavenly virtues expounded by Taoist Tai Chi founder Moy Lin-shin
- The Eight Honors and Eight Shames, also known as the Eight Virtues and Shames, a set of moral concepts developed by former Chinese Communist Party General Secretary Hu Jintao
- The seven virtues of Christianity (heavenly or capital) with an added virtue
