= Wai khru =

Thai ritual formalizing student-teacher relationship

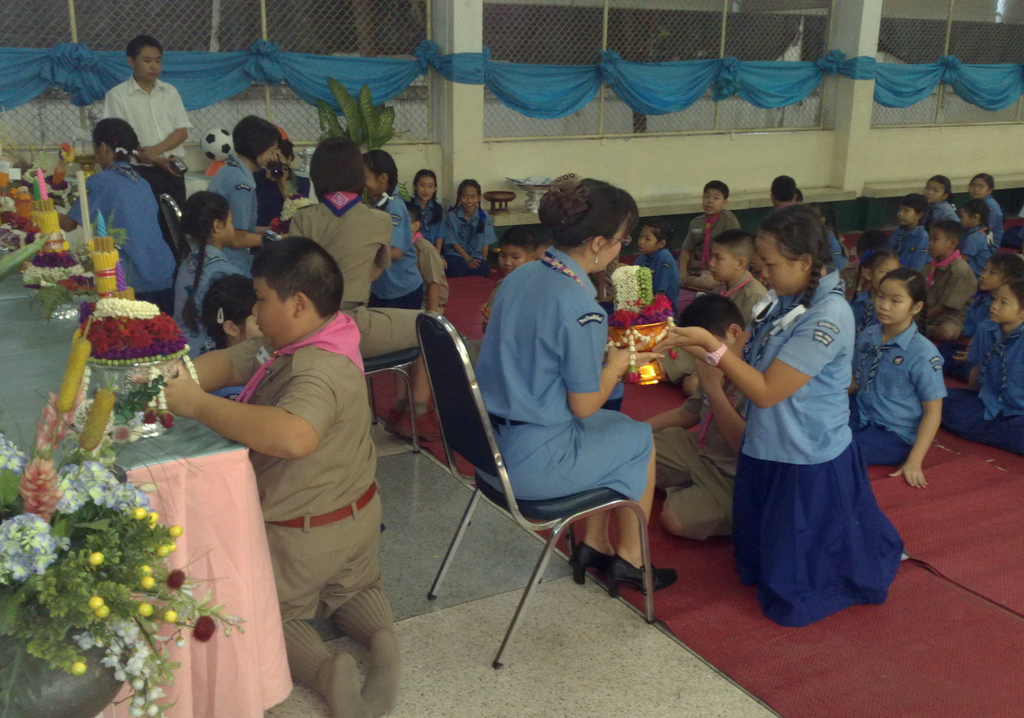
Student representatives present their teachers with offerings during the wai khru ceremony at Wachirawit School, Chiang Mai.

The wai khru ceremony (Thai: พิธีไหว้ครู, pronounced [wâːj kʰrūː]) is a Thai ritual in which students pay respects to teachers in order to express their gratitude and formalize the student–teacher relationship. It is regularly held near the beginning of the school year in most schools in Thailand. Wai khru has long been an important rite in the traditional martial and performing arts, as well as in astrology, Thai Massage and other traditional arts; students and performers of Muay Thai and Krabi Krabong, as well as Thai dance and classical music, will usually perform a wai khru ritual at their initiation as well as before performances to pay respect and homage to both their teachers and the deities who patronize their arts.

== History ==
The rituals of wai khru are believed to have derived from ancient animistic beliefs, influenced by the spread of Brahminism from India. This is evident in the wai khru ceremonies of traditional dance and music, where specific mention is made to Ishvara, and in Thai Massage, where specific mention is made to Shivaga Komarpaj and Narayana, along with other Hindu deities. Wai khru has for most of history existed as a folk tradition, passed on from generation to generation throughout the years.

The wai khru ceremony in its modern form, which is held in most schools today, originated at Triam Udom Suksa School in 1941. The sarabhañña chant was written by Thanpuying Dussadee Malakul Na Ayutthaya (the wife of ML Pin Malakul, director of the school at the time).

== Form ==
=== In educational institutions ===
The wai khru ceremonies which take place in most educational institutions in Thailand today generally follow the same form. The ceremony usually begins with a Buddhist devotion in institutions where Theravada Buddhism is observed as the official religion, followed by the students' recitation of the wai khru chant, which expresses respect for and gratitude to the teachers, and asks for the teachers' blessing of their studies. Following this, a select number of students, usually the representatives of each class, will present the teachers with offerings of flowers, candles and joss sticks arranged on phan (traditional Thai pedestalled trays). This is usually followed by a speech by the headteacher offering the students guidance in their academic career. Many institutions also present student awards and honours during the ceremony.

The traditional offerings for wai khru represent a symbolism of student qualities, namely:

- Ixora (khem, เข็ม) flowers, which while closed form pointed buds, symbolizing sharp wit,
- Cynodon dactylon (ya phraek, หญ้าแพรก or Bermuda grass), the rapid growth and resilience of which symbolize perseverance and the ability to learn,
- Popped rice (khao tok, ข้าวตอก), which symbolizes discipline, and
- Eggplant flowers, which bow low when nearing fruiting, symbolizing respect and humility.

The ceremony is usually held shortly after the beginning of the first term, on a Thursday, as Thursday is traditionally the day of Brihaspati, Vedic god of wisdom and teachers.

=== Thai classical music ===
Wai khru ceremonies for Thai classical music may be held by professional pi phat ensembles or amateur ensembles attached to institutions such as schools and universities. These also take place on Thursday, and are usually held annually, as well as on a smaller scale for the initiation of those beginning to learn the arts.

These ceremonies usually begin with Buddhist rites on the evening before and/or the morning of the ceremony day. Buddhist monks may be invited to perform a merit-making ceremony, and almsgiving made to monks in the morning before the ceremony. The setting of the ceremony is usually arranged with a Buddhist altar on one side and a set of musical instruments on the other, with the taphon, which represents Phra Prakhonthap (Pragondharba), god of the drums and grand-teacher of music, placed in a higher position.

Khon masks representing the gods and teachers of music, Bharata Muni, Pragondharba, Vishvakarman, Pancasikha and Biraba are usually displayed. Representations of Shiva, Vishnu, Brahma and Ganesha may also be included. A table of offerings to the gods and spirits to be invited during the ceremony is arranged, and khan kamnon (ขันกำนล), a bowl of flowers, joss sticks, candles, white cloth and money amounting to six baht, is prepared for worship of the gods.

The ceremony is conducted by a presiding teacher, traditionally dressed in white, who leads the assembly in lighting candles and joss sticks, and saying invocations to pay homage to the Triple Gems and venerating the deities, seeking for their blessing. The musical ensemble will play the na phat, a formal piece of music symbolizing the invitation of the gods and spirits, and the presiding teacher will perform the offering of the prepared foods. Afterwards, the presiding teacher will sprinkle lustral water (prepared earlier during the ceremony) and perform choem, application of a white paste, to the musical instruments, teachers and participants in the ceremony, for good fortune.

The wai khru ceremony is thus concluded, and is usually followed by the khrop khru ceremony, or rite of initiation.

=== Muay Thai ===
Wai khru ram muay is a form of wai khru ritual performed by Muay Thai practitioners before a match.

=== Thai Massage and Traditional Medicine ===
Wai khru is an important part of the culture of traditional massage and medicine in Thailand today. Wai khru ceremonies typically give thanks to a medicine practitioner's lineage of teachers, beginning with the most recent living teachers and culminating with Jīvaka Komārabhacca, the legendary doctor of the Buddha in the Pāli Canon. Various other divine figures, such as deities, rishi, and other spirits are often also recognized. Wai khru ceremonies typically involve chanting incantations in Pāli, Sanskrit, and Thai, which frequently include passages of scripture honoring the Buddha. Wai khru ceremonies are conducted privately by individual healers, and also can be large community events hosted by traditional medicine schools or other institutions.

== Criticism ==
Some observers, particularly left-wing historians Nidhi Eoseewong and Sujit Wongthes, have noted that the modern annual wai khru ceremonies have drifted far from their spirit-worship origins and been transformed into rituals emphasizing the hierarchical status of teachers over students. Whereas older traditions would have teachers and students paying respects together to spirit teachers, the modern tradition instead prominently features the act of students prostrating before their living, personal teachers, a symbolism Sujit claims was invented to promote the government's ideals of authoritarianism during the mid-twentieth century.

== See also ==
- Thai greeting
- Refuge in Buddhism
- Gadaw
- Mingalaba
- Guru–shishya tradition
