= Khrop khru =

The Khrop khru ceremony (Thai: ครอบครู) is an initiation rite practised in the traditional performing arts of Thailand. It is closely related to the wai khru ceremony. Reverence is paid to the Ruesi ("sages") who represent each profession. Khrop khru is most widely known in Thai magical practices (Thai: ไสยศาสตร์) and Buddhism, where the mask of the Ruesi Por Gae Dta Fai is laid upon the heads of devotees, who then sometimes enter into trance or spirit possession when the master of the Samnak (temple/office) chants his magical incantations.
