= Pranāma =

Indian gesture of respect

Pranāma (Sanskrit: प्रणाम; IAST: praṇāma; meaning: "obeisance, prostration or bowing forward") is a form of respectful or reverential salutation (or reverential bowing) before something or another person – usually one's elders, spouse or teachers – as well as anyone deeply respected such as a deity, found in Indian culture and Hindu, Buddhist, Jain and Sikh traditions.

It is also known as the apology hand gesture and used as an apology in certain situations.

== Etymology ==
Pranama is derived from pra (Sanskrit: प्र) and ānama (Sanskrit: आनम); pra as prefix means "forward, in front, before, very, or very much", while ānama means "bending or stretching". Combined pranama means "bending, bowing in front" or "bending much" or "prostration". In cultural terms, it means "respectful salutation" or "reverential bowing" before another, usually elders or teachers or someone deeply respected such as a deity.

== Types ==
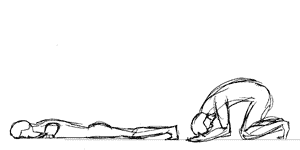
Ashtanga and Dandavat Pranāma.

It is found in Indian culture and Hindu traditions. There are following six types of Pranama:

- Ashtanga (Sanskrit: अष्टाङ्ग, lit. eight parts), also called "Ashtanga Dandavat": following eight parts of body touching the ground simultaneously, Uras (Chest), Shiras (Head), Drishti (Eyes), Manas (Attention), Vachana (Speech), Pada (Feet), Kara (Hand), Jahnu (Knee).
- Shashthanga (Sanskrit: षष्ठाङ्ग, lit. six parts), also called "Shashthanga Dandavat": following six parts of body touching the ground simultaneously, toes, knees, hands, chin, nose and temple.
- Panchanga (Sanskrit: पञ्चाङ्ग, lit. five parts), also called "Panchanga Dandavat": following five parts of body touching the ground simultaneously, knees, chest, chin, temple and forehead.
- Dandavat (Sanskrit: दण्डवत्, lit. stick): following four parts of body touching the ground simultaneously, bowing forehead down to ground while being on knees with knees, feet, forehead & hands touching the ground.
- Namaskara (Sanskrit: नमस्कार, lit. adoration) folded hands touching the forehead while standing or sitting. This is a more common form of salutation and greeting expressed between people. Also see Balinese Hinduism' sembah and Thai greeting based on the Indian Namaskara.
- Abhinandana (Sanskrit: अभिनन्दन, lit. congratulations) – bending forward with folded hands touching the chest.

== As an apology ==
It is a Hindu custom to apologize in the form of a hand gesture with the right hand when a person's foot accidentally touches a book or any written material (which are considered as a manifestation of the goddess of knowledge Saraswati), money (which is considered as a manifestation of the goddess of wealth Lakshmi) or another person's leg. The offending person first touches the object with the fingertips and then the forehead and/or chest.

== Related forms of salutations ==
A form of pranama is Charanasparsha (Sanskrit: चरणस्पर्श, lit. touching the feet) a bowing combined with the touching of the feet, as a mark of respect. It may be seen in temples during darshan (viewing of the deity to pay obeisance). This related type of pranama is most common in Indian culture. It is done in order to show respect towards elderly people like parents, grandparents, elderly relatives, guru (teachers), sadhu (saints) and sanyasis (monks).

== See also ==
- Añjali Mudrā
- Culture of India
- Guru-shishya tradition
- Indian honorifics
- Mudras
- Namaste
- Puja (Buddhism)
- Puja (Hinduism)
- Pādodaka
- Sembah
