= Sembah =

Indonesian greeting and gesture as a way of demonstrating respect and reverence

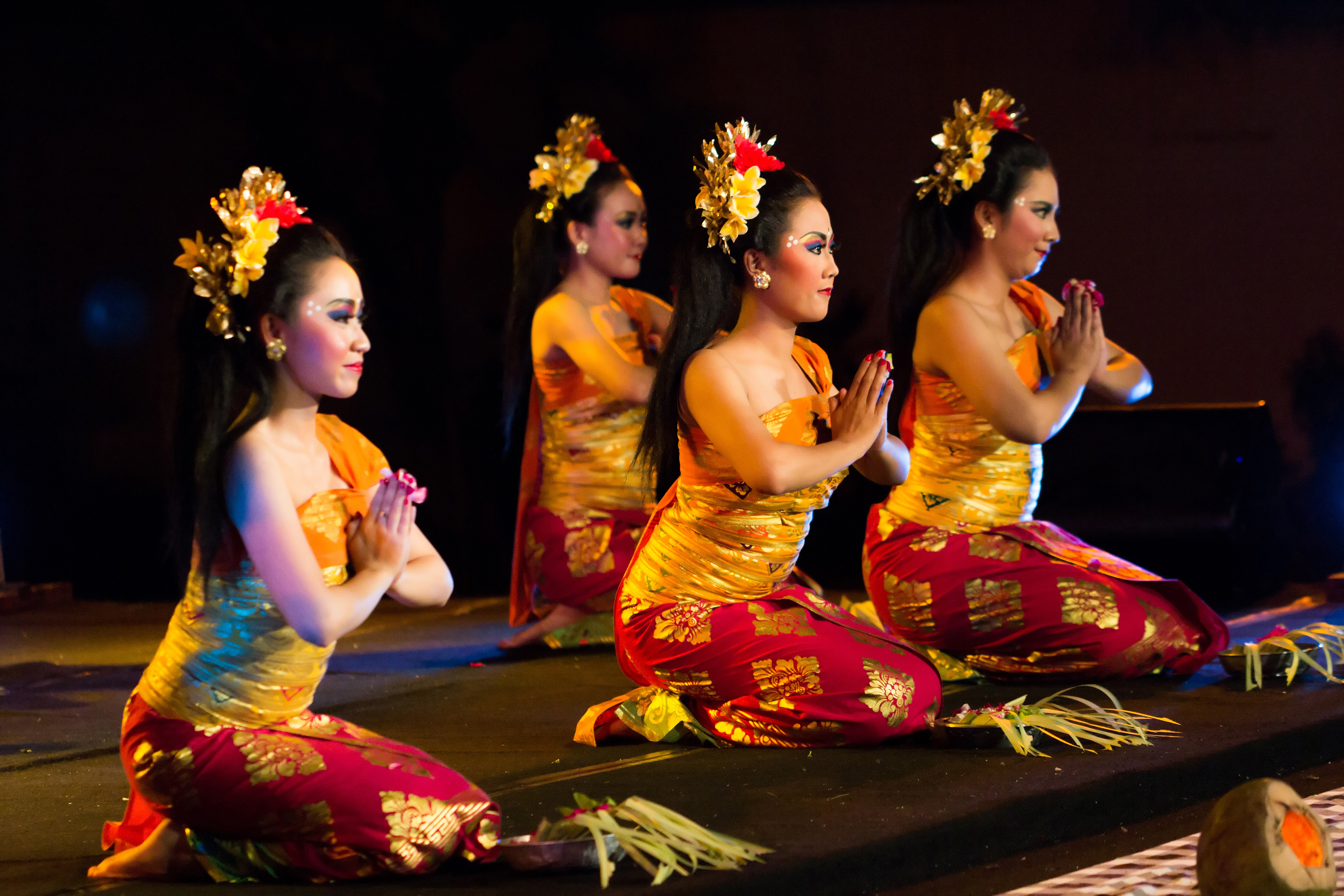
- Sembah as part of pendet dance movement
- Types: Traditional greeting
- Ancestor arts: Indonesian
- Originating culture: Indonesia
- Originating era: Hindu - Buddhist civilisations

Sembah (Javanese: ꦱꦼꦩ꧀ꦧꦃ, Sundanese: ᮞᮨᮙᮘᮃᮠ, Balinese: ᬲᭂᬫ᭄ᬩᬄ) is an Indonesian greeting and gesture of respect and reverence performed by clasping the palms together solemnly in a prayer-like fashion, placing them in front of the chest and, while bowing slightly, moving the pressed palms up to either the chin, or until the thumbs touch the tip of their nose, depending on the status of the person greeted.

Sembah is endemic and prevalent in Nusantara regional cultures sharing dharmic heritage—such as Balinese, Javanese, and Sundanese. It is cognate to the Cambodian sampeah and Thai wai. All of these greetings are based on the Indian Añjali Mudrā used in namasté.

== Etymology ==
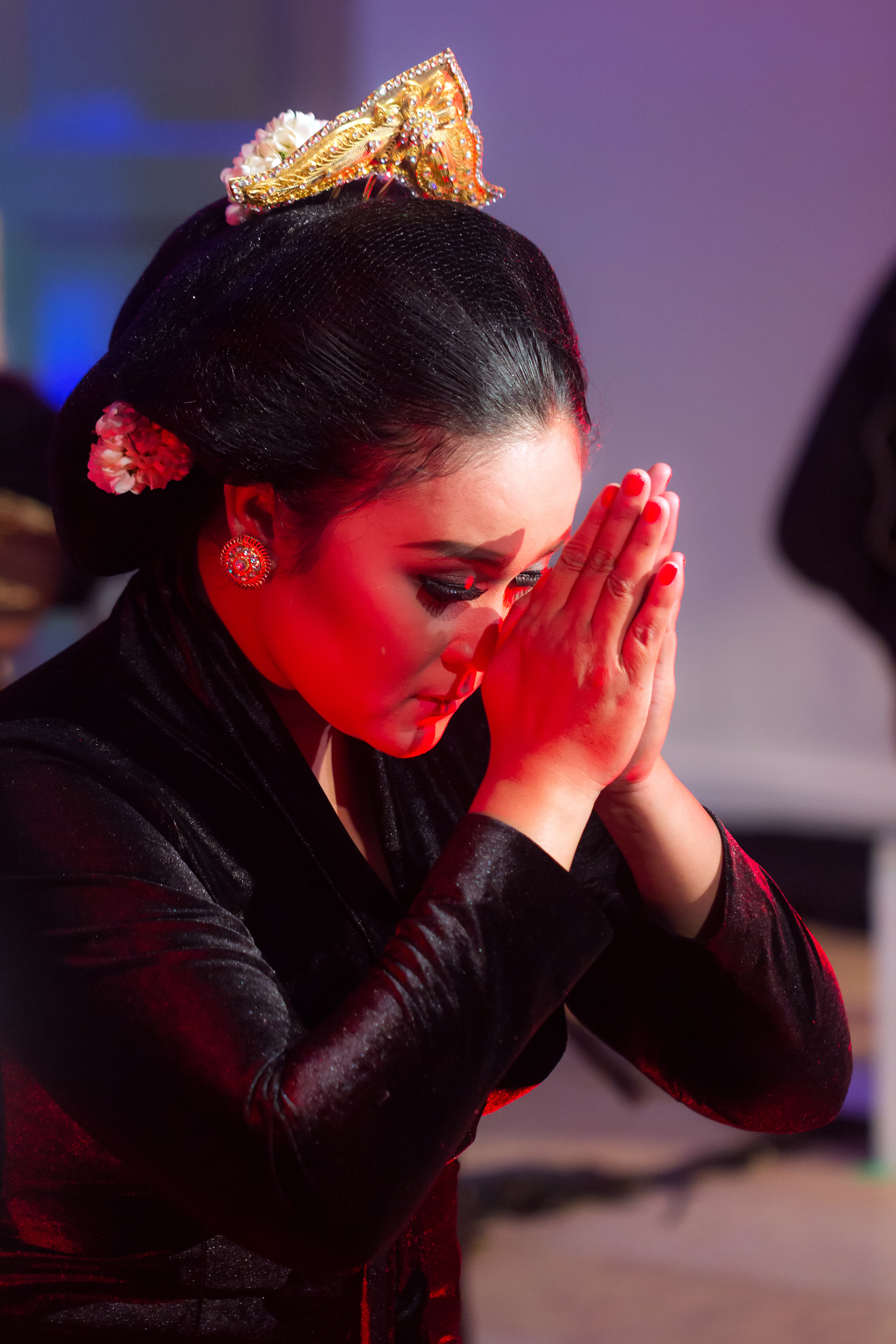
Javanese susuhunan, a gesture to convey respect

In Indonesian and Malay, the term sembah means to pay the honour, obeisance, or homage, or to worship. According to Indonesian writer Hamka in his book Dari Perbendaharaan Lama, the word derives from a Javanese word susunan, with the receiver of the susunan or sembath being referred to as the susuhunan or sesembahan.

== Origin ==
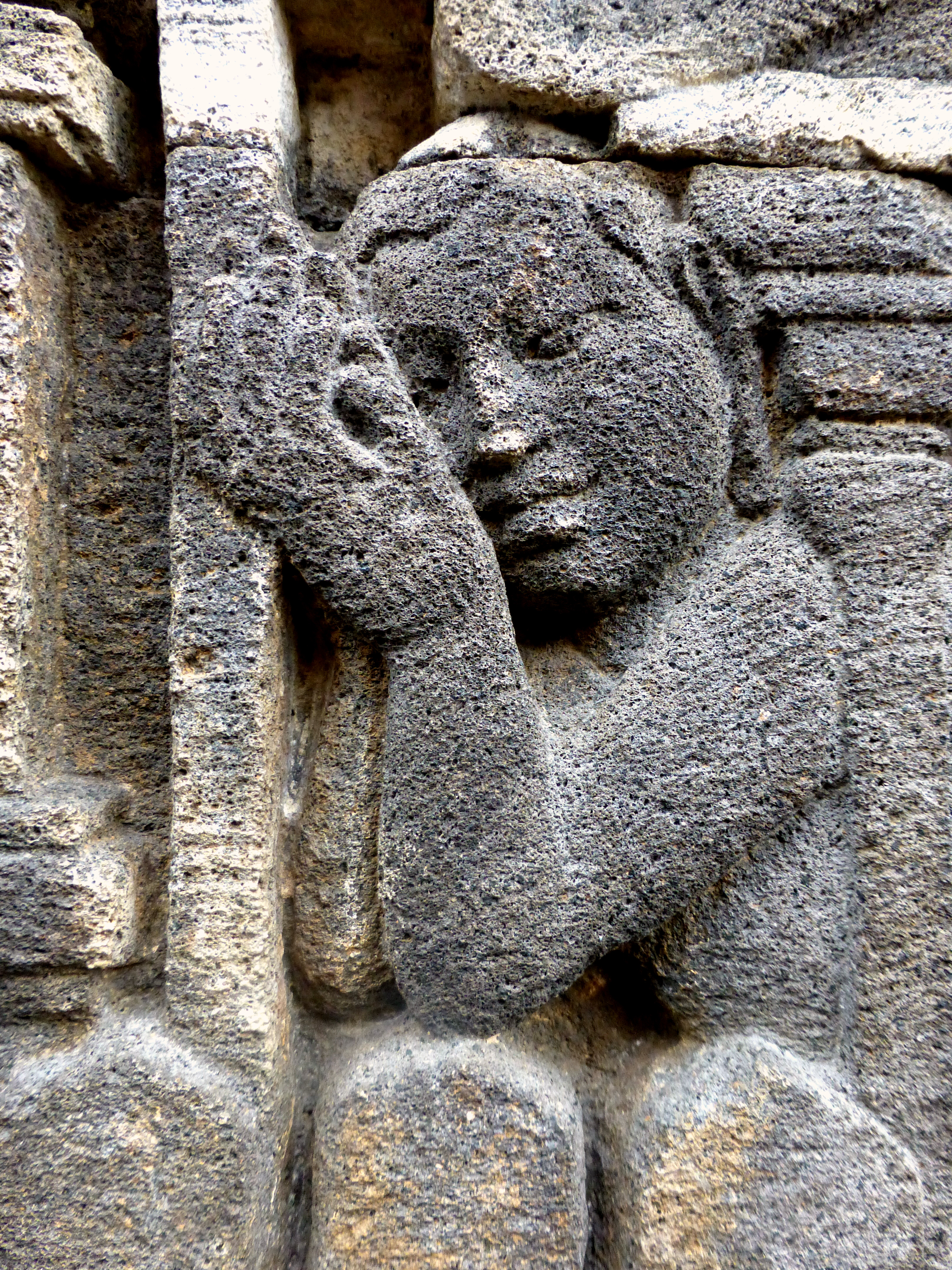
Sembah depicted in a Borobudur bas-relief

Sembah first appeared c. 4000 years ago on clay seals from the Indus Valley Civilisation. Images of sembah later appear in bas-reliefs of Javanese Candi, such as the 9th-century temples of Borobudur and Prambanan. From then, the sembah gesture was endemic in the region, especially in Java and Bali.

== Social and cultural significance ==
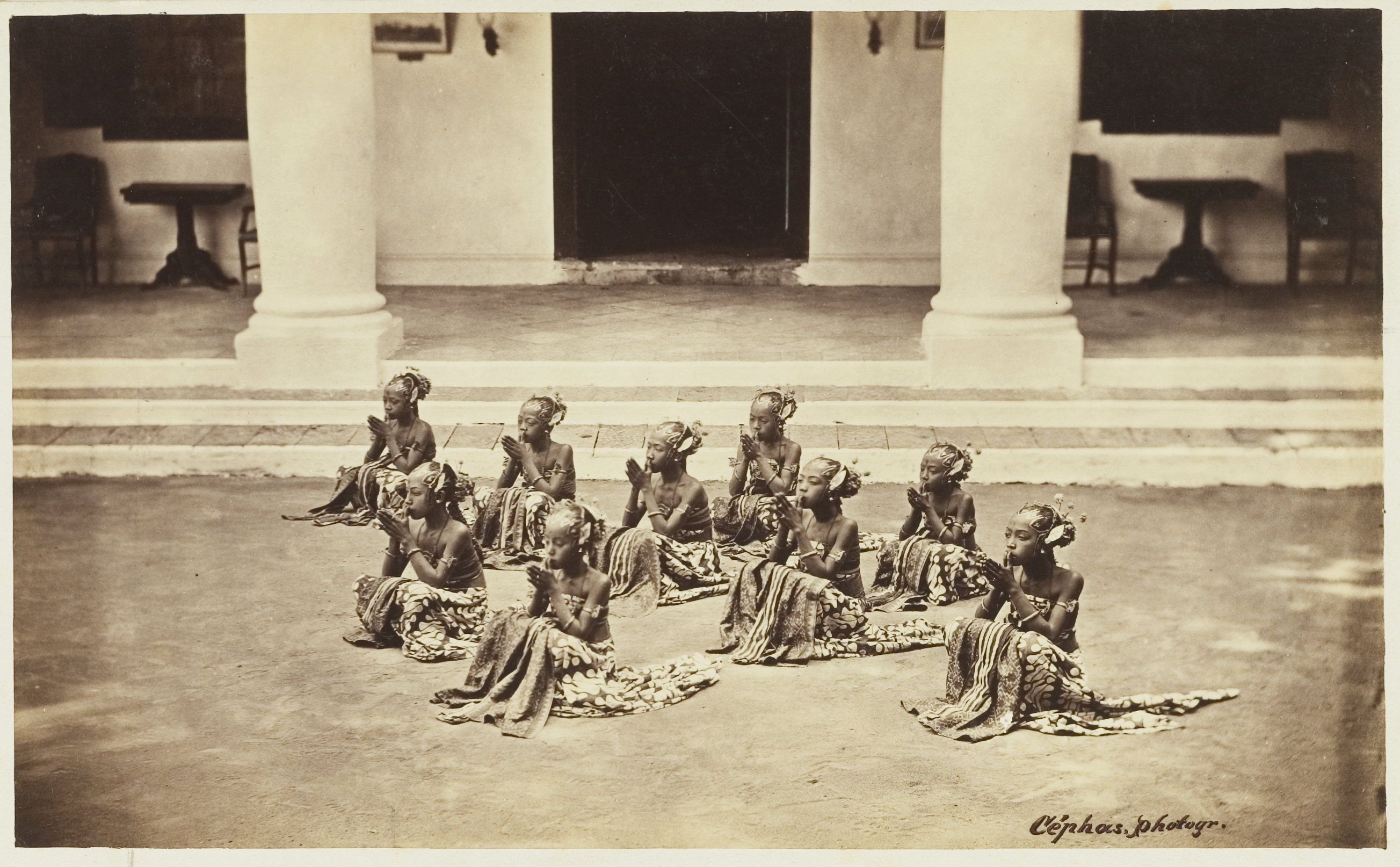
A late 19th-century photograph of Bedhaya dancers performing sembah in keraton Yogyakarta by Kassian Cephas. Sembah is prescribed etiquette in Javanese courts.

Sembah is a prescribed etiquette and much-preferred in keratons or the Javanese courts of Yogyakarta and Surakarta, where it is important to greet kings, princes, and nobles in this gesture. Sembah is expected among the Javanese aristocratic circle of ningrat and priyayi, where the height of raised clasped-hand corresponds to the social stature of the person in question. The higher sembah hands are raised, and the lower the body is bowed, the higher the social stature of the person revered. In Javanese court tradition, the pisowanan ngabektèn ("visit to offer homage") ceremony is annually held during Lebaran (Eid al-Fitr), when Javanese kings receive from their subjects the sembah sungkem from their subjects, a kind of sembah performed by bowing the body low, then clasping the hands at the lap or knee of the revered person.

Sembah also has become incorporated in standard protocol towards Malay royalty, and it is still continued in Malaysia and Brunei.

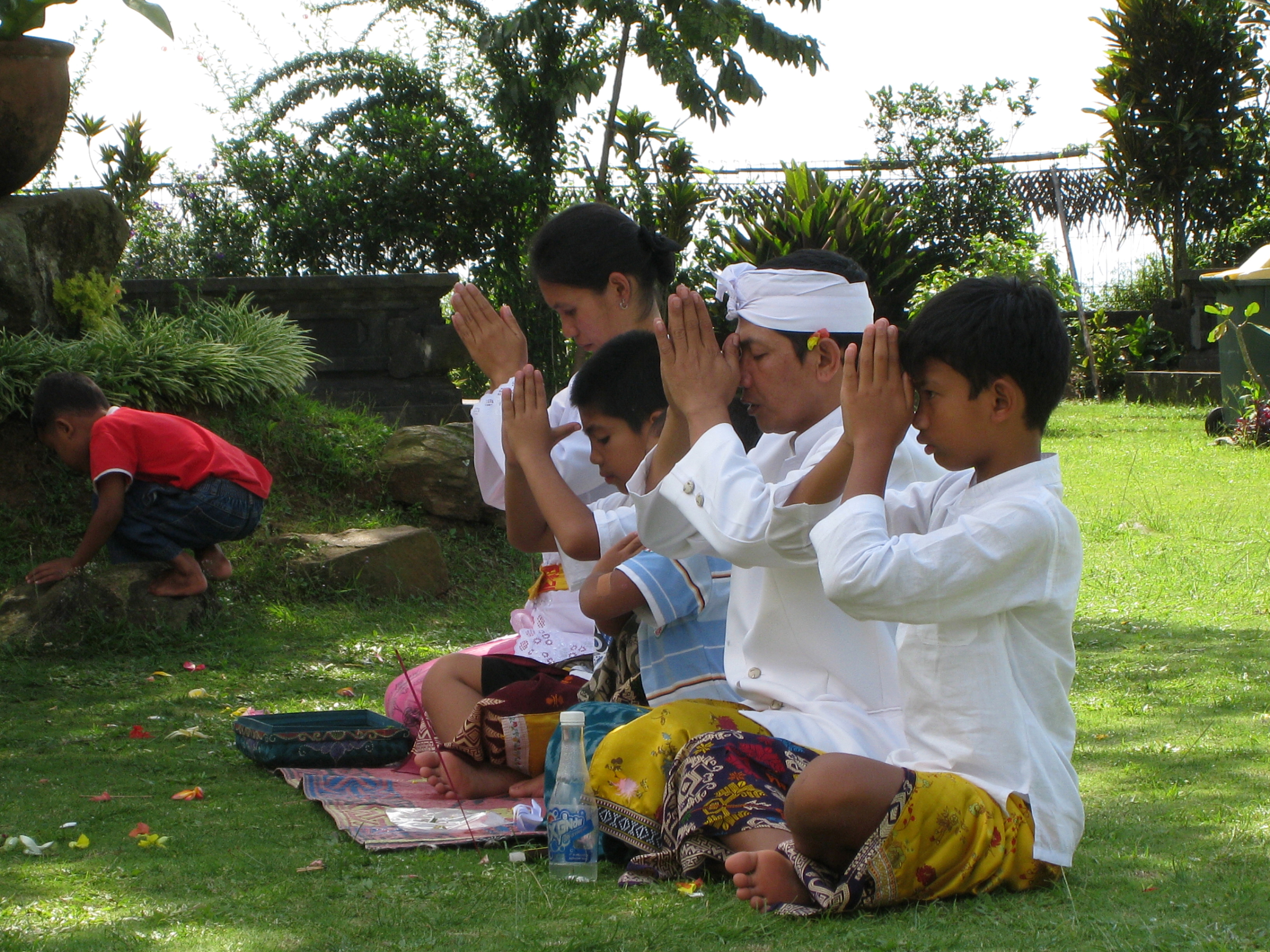
Kramaning sembah worship gesture during Hindu Balinese sembahyang

Sembah is also a common social practice in Bali, where the legacies of Hindu etiquette and customs, are still alive and well. In Balinese tradition, in the sembah for greeting the joined palms are placed lower than the chin, while in the high sembah, usually reserved only for religious worship, the clasped palms are risen to over the forehead.

In Sundanese tradition of West Java, sembah often replaces the modern handshake.

Within the Minangkabau culture of West Sumatra, sembah is also known as salam sembah. In Jambi, Sumatra, the gesture is called seloko, or seloko salam sembah.

In Javanese and Sundanese, usually no words are spoken during sembah. However, in the Balinese version, the words om swastiastu, meaning "oh God, I hope all goodness (safety, happiness and prosperity) comes from all directions," are often spoken with the sembah. In ancient Indonesia, the word "swasti" is said during sembah, as shown by stone inscriptions, such as the Kedukan Bukit Inscription, found in Java and Sumatra.

== Contemporary practice ==
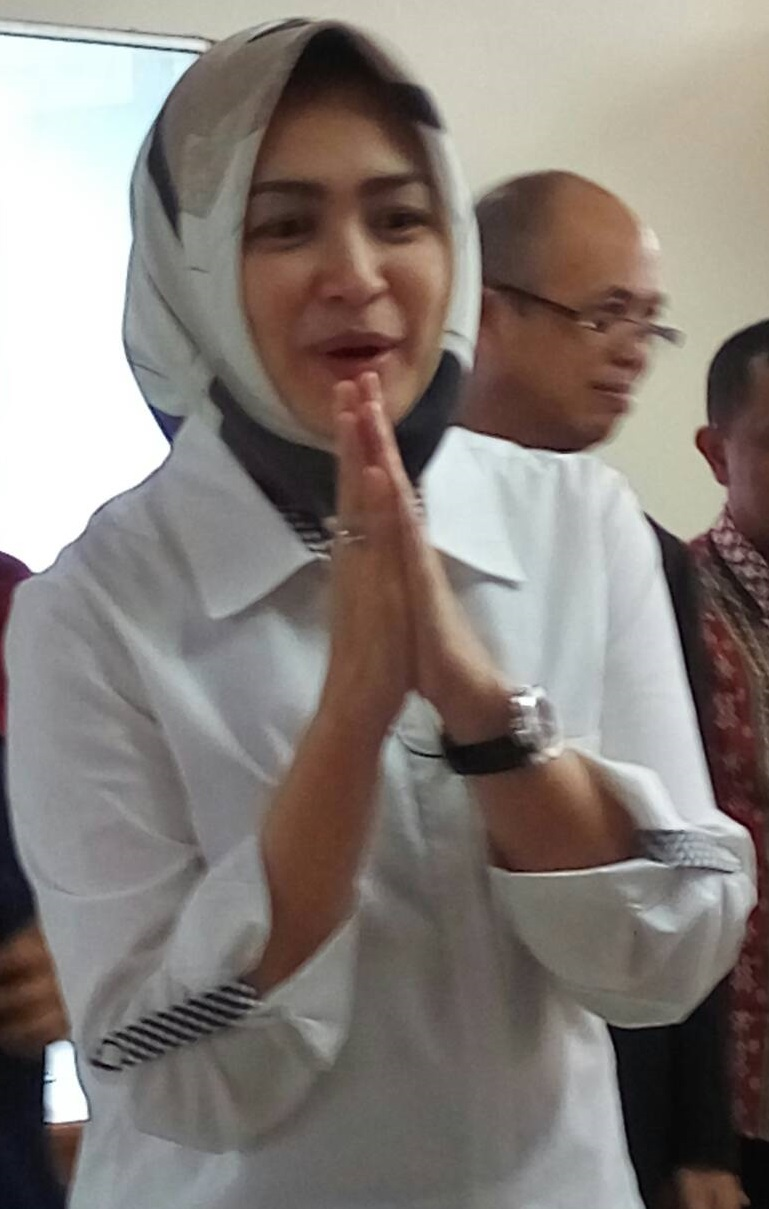
Indonesian politician greeting attending crowds by performing the salam sembah

Today, sembah is used in many ways, including in the hospitality industry in Indonesia. It is performed by Garuda Indonesia flight attendants to greet passengers prior to and after flights, and also commonly used as welcome greetings by staff in Indonesian hotels, resorts and spas.

Sembah is often performed by prominent figures, politicians, state officials, president, VIPs, or important persons during public visits to greet crowds. This is usually done when approaching and personally greeting each individual is not possible. During the COVID-19 pandemic, this non-contact social greeting was promoted to replace the common handshake to prevent direct contact and uphold social distancing.

== In dances ==
Sembah is often performed in ritualized Indonesian traditional dances, such as Lampung's tari persembahan and Palembang's tanggai dance, as well as its Malay variants. In Sundanese, Javanese, and Balinese dances, sembah is often incorporated into dance movements, such as bedhaya, serimpi, topeng, wayang orang, panyembrama and pendet.

== See also ==
- Sampeah
- Wai
- Namasté
- Sunan
- Culture of Indonesia
