= Ashtavarana =

In Lingayat theology, the Ashtavarana (ಅಷ್ಟಾವರಣ, ಎಂಬಗೆ, ಎಂಟು ಬಗೆ) refer to the eight virtues that act as shields or coverings protecting the devotee from extraneous distractions and influences of Maya. Ashta means 'eight' and Avarana means 'covering'. They also protect against attachment to worldly desires.

The Ashtavaranas are described as,

- Guru
- Linga Ishta-Linga
- Jangama
- Vibhuti or Bhasma
- Rudraksha
- Padodaka
- Prasada
- Mantra

Among the ashtavarnas, Guru, Linga and Jangama are the human beings to be worshiped. Guru means religious teacher at some stage his own conscious (arivu) can also become guru. Linga is considered to be the self (inner atma). and Lastly the Jangama is the human who wonders and propagates the teachings of dharma. Vibhuti, Mantra and Rudraksha are the things, by which one has to worship Guru, Linga and Jangama. Vibhuti is the indication of purity. It also means that it is to burnt the Desires of Lust and Greed of materliastic possessions and comfort. Mantra is the holy chanting words. Normally Lingayats chant " OM LINGAYA NAMAH" and some chant " OM NAMAH SHIVAYA" . Rudraksha is the thing one has to wear on the body. Rudraksha are available in punchamukhi and Ekmukhi Rudrakshas. In spiritually it is the symbol of third eye of "MAHADEVA" or "SHIVA". Here it can be interpreted as inner conscious, which plays as third eye. Lastly Padaodaka and Prasada are the outcomes of this worship. Padodaka is the liquid, and Prasad is food. Here spiritually one can interpret Padodaka as the knowledge outcome from Guru, Linga and Jangama's when they discuss daily concerns with their Anubhava (experience). Prasad is the daily food accepted after the worship.

== Sources ==
- Patil, S H, 2002: Community Dominance and Political Modernisation - The Lingayats (p 24 ff). Mittal Publications: New Delhi
