= Gadaw =

Gadaw (Burmese: ကန်တော့, IPA: [ɡədɔ̰]; also spelt kadaw) is a Burmese verb referring to a Burmese tradition in which a person, always of lower social standing, pays respect or homage to a person of higher standing (including Buddhist monks, elders, teachers and Buddha), by kneeling before them and paying obeisance with joined hands, and bowing. This is usually done by students to their teachers or children or grandchildren to their elders (parents, aunts, uncles and grandparents), in order to show gratitude and reverence and an opportunity to ask for forgiveness, often involving gift-giving.

It is traditionally done on New Year's Day of Thingyan and during the month of Thadingyut (roughly October), which marks the end of Vassa, the Buddhist lent.

The tradition is widely believed to have Buddhist roots, as teachers and parents (မိဘ၊ ဆရာသမား) are honored as part of the Five Infinite Venerables (အနန္တငါးပါး), along with the Three Jewels, namely the Buddha, the Dhamma and the Sangha. Moreover, the Mangala Sutta, the source of the 38 Buddhist Beatitudes, describes the importance of "honoring those worthy of honor" (ပူဇာ စ ပူဇနေယျနာနံ၊, pujā ca pujāneyyanānam) and lists respect, humbleness, gratitude and as among the highest blessings. Obeisance ceremonies are also held for neighborhood elders, and professional mentors, such as writers and actors.

The collective gadaw of teachers is called a hsaya gadaw pwe (ဆရာကန်တော့ပွဲ) or more formally acariya puja pwe or asariya puzaw pwe (အာစရိယပူဇော်ပွဲ), usually done formally during the month of Thadingyut (or World Teachers' Day on 5 October) by students or alumni at schools and universities throughout the country.

During the time of the Burmese monarchy, a ritualized gadaw ceremony called the gadaw pwedaw (ကန်တော့ပွဲတော်) was practised at least three times a year at the royal palace, by tributary chieftains and rulers as well as subjects to the king, as a symbolic form of allegiance. Gadaw nay (ကန်တော့နေ့) was one such time, occurring at the end of the Buddhist lent, and when tributes and gifts are formally offered to the king.

The traditional Burmese request of the Three Jewels (Triple Gem), a formulaic prayer (termed Okāsa or the "Buddhist common prayer" by Pe Maung Tin) that precedes most Buddhist ceremonies, explicitly references the gadaw of the Five Infinite Venerables (Buddha, Dhamma, Sangha, parents and teachers):

ဩကာသ ၊ ဩကာသ ၊ ဩကာသ။

ကာယကံ ဝစီကံ မနောကံ၊ သဗ္ဗဒေါသ ခပ်သိမ်းသော အပြစ်တို့ကိုပျောက်ပါစေခြင်း အကျိုးငှာ ပထမ ဒုတိယ တတိယ၊ တစ်ကြိမ် နှစ်ကြိမ် သုံးကြိမ်မြောက်အောင် ဘုရားရတနာ၊ တရားရတနာ၊ သံဃာရတနာ ရတနာ မြတ်သုံးပါး (မိဘ၊ ဆရာသမား) တို့အား အရိုအသေ အလေးအမြတ် လက်အုပ်မိုး၍ ရှိခိုးပူဇော်ဖူးမြော်မာန်လျှော့ ကန်တော့ပါ၏ အရှင်ဘုရား။

ကန်တော့ရသော ကုသိုလ်ကံစေတနာတို့ကြောင့် အပါယ်လေးပါး၊ ကပ်သုံးပါး၊ ရပ်ပြစ်ရှစ်ပါး၊ ရန်သူမျိုးငါးပါး၊ ဝိပတ္တိတရားလေးပါး၊ ဗျသနတရားငါးပါး၊ အနာမျိုးကိုးဆယ့်ခြောက်ပါး၊ မိစ္ဆာဒိဋ္ဌိတရား ခြောက်ဆယ့်နှစ်ပါး တို့မှ အခါခပ်သိမ်းကင်းလွတ် ငြိမ်းသည်ဖြစ်၍ မဂ်တရား ဖိုလ်တရား နိဗ္ဗာန် တရားတော်မြတ်ကိုလျင်မြန်စွာရပါလို၏ အရှင်ဘုရား။

I request! I request! I request!

In order that any action I may have committed against the Three Jewels (with my parents and teachers) either physically, verbally and mentally may be effaced, and in order that I may acquire merit which will bestow upon me longevity, health, freedom from dangers and others; I raise my joined hands in reverence to the forehead and worship, honor, look at, and humbly pay homage to the Three Jewels: the Buddha, the Dhamma, and the Samgha (with my parents and teachers) once, twice, and three times.

As a result of this meritorious act of prostration may I be freed at all times from the woeful realms, the three kinds of catastrophes, the eight kinds of wrong circumstances, the five kinds of enemies, the four kinds of misfortunes, the five kinds of loss, the ninety six or ninety eight kinds of diseases, and the sixty two kinds of wrong views; and quickly attain the Path, the Fruition, and the Noble Dhamma of Nibbāna.

A more ritualized form called the wai khru is found in neighboring Thailand. A similar tradition, called dam hua is practiced in the Lanna region of Northern Thailand, especially during Songkran, the Thai new year.

== See also ==
- Awgatha
- Cetiya
- Refuge in Buddhism
- Buddhist devotion
- Mingalaba

== See also ==
- Wai khru
- Kowtow
