= Añjali Mudrā =

Hand gesture, associated with Dharmic religions, practiced throughout Asia and beyond

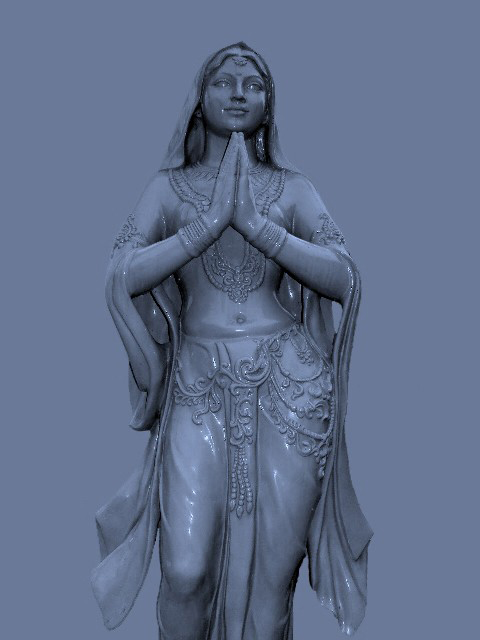
Statue with hands in the Añjali mudrā position.

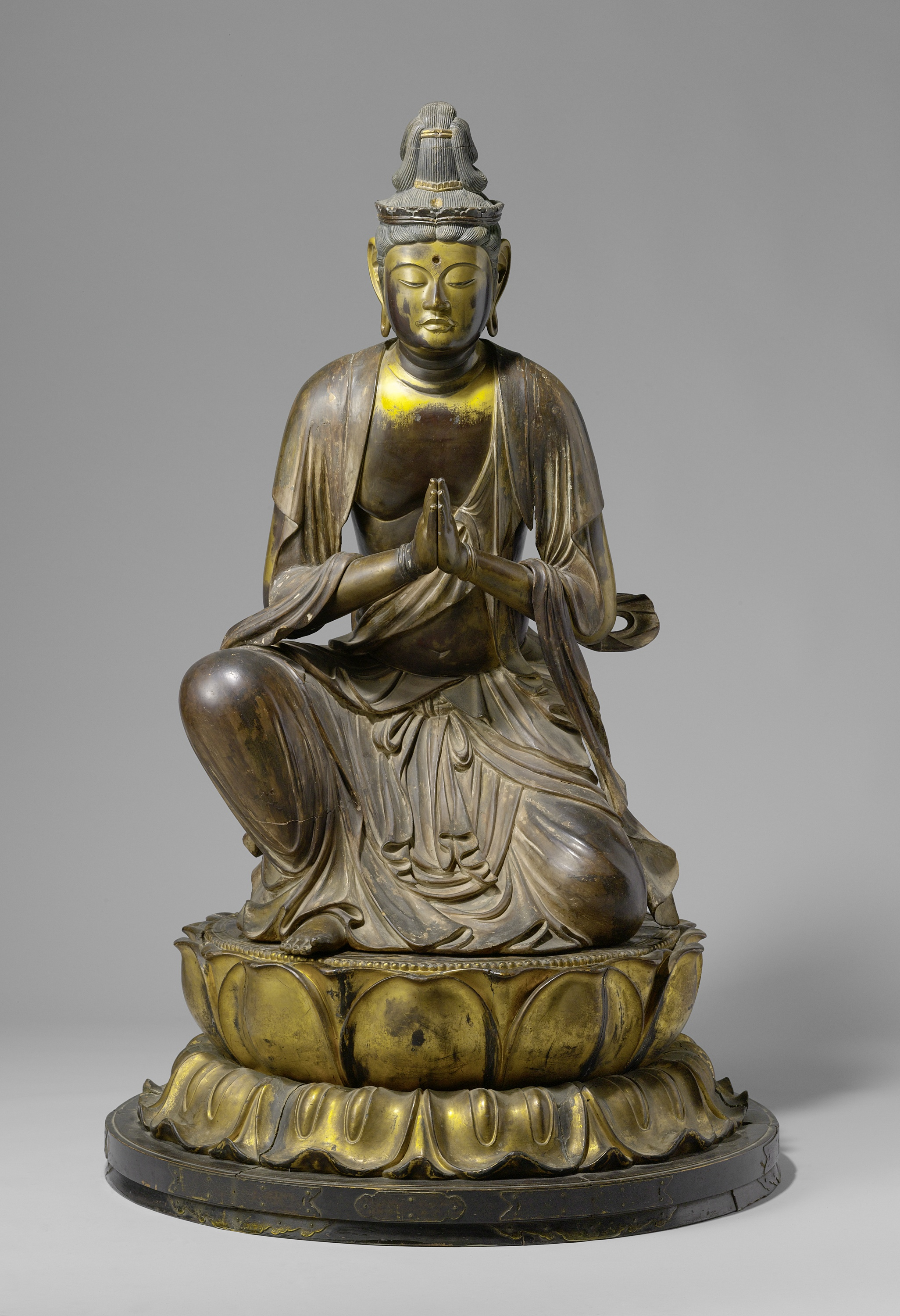
A Japanese statue of the Bodhisattva Mahāsthāmaprāpta, performing Añjali mudrā.

Añjali Mudrā (Sanskrit: अञ्जलि मुद्रा) is a hand gesture mainly associated with Indian religions and arts, encountered throughout Asia. It features in Indian classical dance such as Bharatanatyam, yoga practice, and forms part of the greeting namaste. Among the performing arts, Añjali mudrā is a form of non-verbal, visual communication to the audience. It is one of 24 saṃyukta mudrās of the Indian classical arts. There are several forms of the Añjali mudrā such as the brahmāñjali.

The gesture is incorporated into many yoga asanas. The modern yoga pose praṇāmāsana (Sanskrit: प्रणामासन) involves standing upright, with the hands in Añjali mudrā.

As a gesture, it is widely used as a sign of respect or a silent greeting in India and other parts of Asia. It is also used among East Asian Buddhists, Chinese religionists, Shintoists, and adherents of similar Asian traditions. The gesture is used as a part of prayer or for worship in many Indian religions and other Eastern religions.

In sculpture, the Añjali mudrā is common at entrances and in relief works of historic temples, such as the Lingobhavamurti of Shaivism. It differs from namaste by being a non-verbal gesture, for namaste can be said with or without any gesture. According to Bhaumik and Govil, the Añjali mudrā and Namaskara mudrā are very similar but have subtle differences. The backs of the thumbs in Añjali mudrā face the chest and are perpendicular to the other fingers, while the thumbs in Namaskara mudrā are aligned with the other fingers.

== Etymology ==
Añjali (अञ्जलि) is a Sanskrit word that refers to the cavity formed between the palms by folding the hands together to hold and offer flowers or water, or to give or to receive something. When the hands are pressed together and raised, the gesture connotes "respect", "reverence", "benediction", "salutation" or a form of "supplication". The word is derived from añj, meaning "to honour or celebrate". Añjali connotes a "divine offering" or "a gesture of reverence".

Mudrā means "seal" or "sign". The meaning of the phrase is thus "salutation seal".

Añjali mudrā is described in ancient Indian texts such as in verses 9.127–128 of the Nāṭya Śāstra (200 BCE – 200 CE), in texts on temple architecture dated after the 6th century CE such as in verse 5.67 of the Devatāmūrtiprakaraṇa, and in the Citrasūtras, which are texts on painting. The Nāṭya Śāstra, a classical Indian dance text, describes it as a posture in which the two hands are folded together in a reverential state, used to pray before a deity, receive any person one reveres, and also to greet friends. The Nāṭya Śāstra further states that for prayers inside a temple, the Añjali mudrā should be placed near or above one's head; while meeting someone venerable, it is placed in front of one's face or chin; and for friends, near one's chest.

The gesture is also known as hṛdayāñjali mudrā meaning "reverence to the heart seal" (from hṛd, Sanskrit: ह्रद्, meaning "heart") and ātmānjali mudrā meaning "reverence to the self seal" (from ātman, Sanskrit: आत्मन, meaning "self").

== Description ==
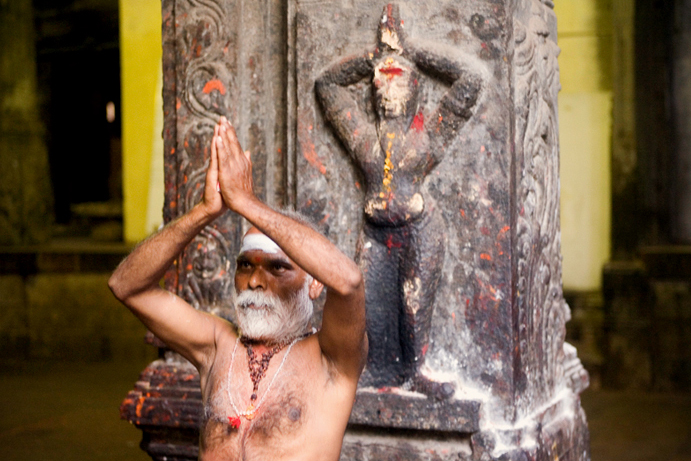
A sadhu performing Anjali mudrā at his crown chakra in front of a sculpted figure in the same posture

Añjali mudrā is performed by pressing the palms of the hands together firmly and evenly, with the fingers together and fingertips pointing up. In the most common form of Añjali mudrā, the hands are held at the heart chakra, with the thumbs resting lightly against the sternum. The gesture may also be performed at the Ājñā or brow chakra, with thumbtips resting against the "third eye", or at the crown chakra (above the head). In some yoga postures, the hands are placed in the Añjali mudrā position to one side of the body or behind the back. The gesture normally accompanied by a slight bowing of the head.

== Symbolic meaning ==
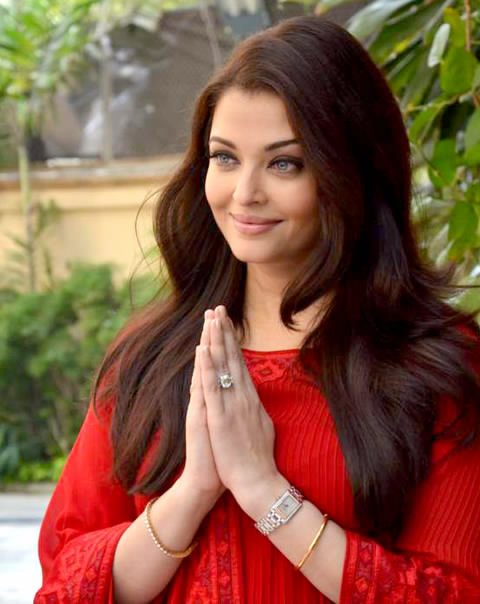
Aishwarya Rai making a namaste gesture

Añjali mudrā has the same meaning as the Sanskrit greeting namaste and can be performed while saying namaste or praṇāma, or in place of vocalizing the word. The gesture is used for both greetings and farewells, but carries a deeper significance than a simple "hello" or "goodbye". The joining together of the palms is said to provide a connection between the right and left hemispheres of the brain and to represent unification. This yoking is symbolic of the practitioner's connection with the divine in all things. The word namaste is sometimes translated as "I bow to the divinity within you, from the divinity within me."

In Sri Lanka the Sinhalese gesture of welcome incorporates the word "ayubowan" (may you live long) with both hands placed together on the sternum along with a slight bow.

== Physical benefits ==
Añjali mudrā is performed as part of a physical yoga practice to achieve several benefits. It is a "centering pose" that, according to practitioners, helps alleviate mental stress and anxiety, assisting the practitioner in achieving focus and entering a meditative state. The pose helps promote flexibility in the hands, wrists, fingers, and arms.

== Use in asanas ==
While Añjali mudrā can be performed by itself from any seated or standing posture, the gesture is incorporated into yoga as exercise practice as part of asanas including:

- Anjaneyasana (lunge) – with arms overhead
- Hanumanasana (monkey pose)
- Malasana (garland pose)
- Matsyasana (fish pose) – an advanced variant
- Prasarita Padottanasana (wide-legged forward bend) – an advanced variant with hands behind the back
- Rajakapotasana (Pigeon Pose/King Pigeon Pose) – Añjali mudrā in Pigeon pose
- Tadasana/samasthiti (mountain pose) – a variant of the pose used during Sun Salutation sequences
- Urdhva Hastasana (upward salute/extended mountain pose) – arms overhead
- Virabhadrasana I (warrior I) – arms overhead
- Vrikshasana (tree pose)

== See also ==
- List of mudras (dance)
- List of mudras (yoga)
- Mingalaba
- Pranāma
- Praying Hands (Dürer)
- Sampeah
- Sembah
- Wai (gesture)
