= Namaste =

Customary Hindu greeting

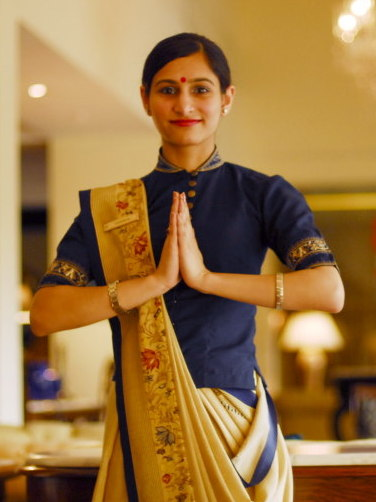
Pressing hands together with a smile to greet namastē – a common cultural gesture in India

Namastē (Sanskrit pronunciation: [nɐmɐsteː], Devanagari: नमस्ते), sometimes called namaskāra and namaskāram, is a customary Hindu manner of respectfully greeting and honouring a person or group, used at any time of day. It is used by people of the Hindu, Buddhist and Jain traditions. Namastē is usually spoken with a slight bow and hands pressed together, palms touching and fingers pointing upwards, thumbs close to the chest. This gesture is Añjali Mudrā; the standing posture in modern yoga that incorporates it is praṇāmāsana.

== Etymology, meaning and origins ==
Namastē (Namas + tē) is derived from Sanskrit and is a combination of the word namas and the second person dative pronoun in its enclitic form, te. The word namaḥ takes the form namas before the sound tē.

It is found in the Vedic literature. Namas-kṛta and related terms appear in the Hindu scripture Rigveda such as in the Vivāha Sūkta, verse 10.85.22 in the sense of "worship, adore", while Namaskāra appears in the sense of "exclamatory adoration, homage, salutation and worship" in the Atharvaveda, the Taittiriya Samhita, and the Aitareya Brahmana. It is an expression of veneration, worship, reverence, an "offering of homage" and "adoration" in the Vedic literature and post-Vedic texts such as the Mahabharata. The phrase Namas-te appears with this meaning in Rigveda 8.75.10, Atharvaveda verse 6.13.2, Taittirya Samhita 2.6.11.2 and in numerous other instances in many early Hindu texts. It is also found in numerous ancient and medieval era sculpture and maṇḍapa relief artwork in Hindu temples.

According to the Indologist Stephen Phillips, the terms "tē and tvam" are an informal, familiar form of "you" in Sanskrit, and it is typically not used for unfamiliar adults. It is reserved for someone familiar, intimate, divine or a child. By using the dative form of tvam in the greeting Namas-tē, there is an embedded secondary, metaphorical sense in the word. This is the basis of the pragmatic meaning of Namas-tē, that is "salutations to the (divine) child (in your heart)", states Phillips.

In the contemporary era, namaḥ means 'bow', 'obeisance', 'reverential salutation' or 'adoration' and te means 'to you' (singular dative case of 'tvam'). Therefore, namastē literally means "bowing to you". In Hinduism, it also has a spiritual import reflecting the belief that "the divine and self (ātman, Self) is same in you and me", and connotes "I bow to the divine in you". According to the sociologist Holly Oxhandler, it is a Hindu term which means "the sacred in me recognizes the sacred in you."

A less common variant is used in the case of three or more people being addressed namely Namo vaḥ which is a combination of namaḥ and the enclitic second person plural pronoun vaḥ. The word namaḥ takes the sandhi form namō before the sound v. An even less common variant is used in the case of two people being addressed, namely, Namō vām, which is a combination of namaḥ and the enclitic second person dual pronoun vām.

Excavations at Indus Valley Civilisation sites have found male and female terracotta figures in a posture like Añjali Mudrā. These archaeological findings are dated to the Mature Harappan.

Añjali Mudrā in historic Hindu temple reliefs

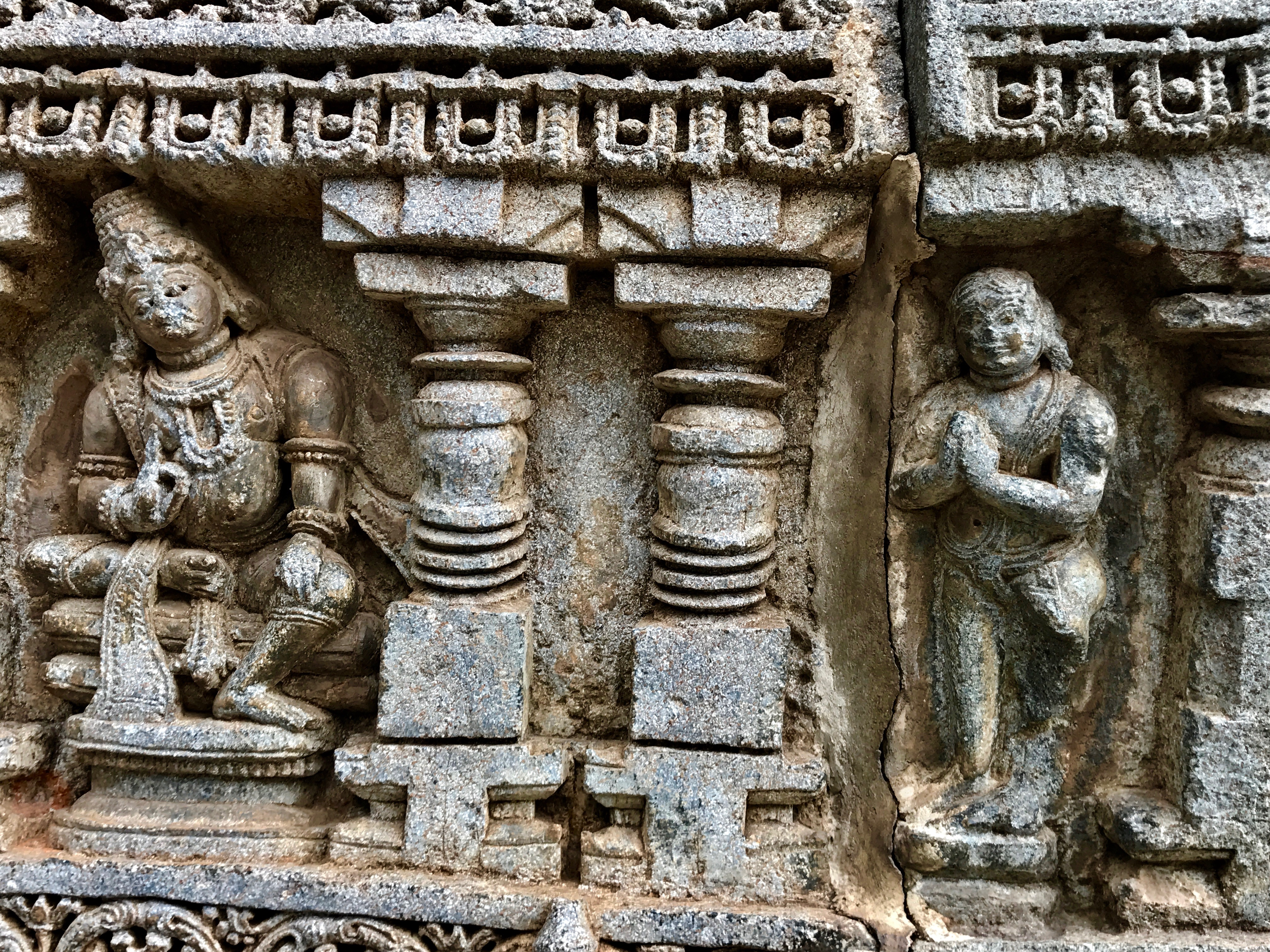
Hindu god Kubēra on the left with a person in Añjali Mudrā (13th century Chennakeshava Temple, Somanathapura, Mysuru, Karnataka).

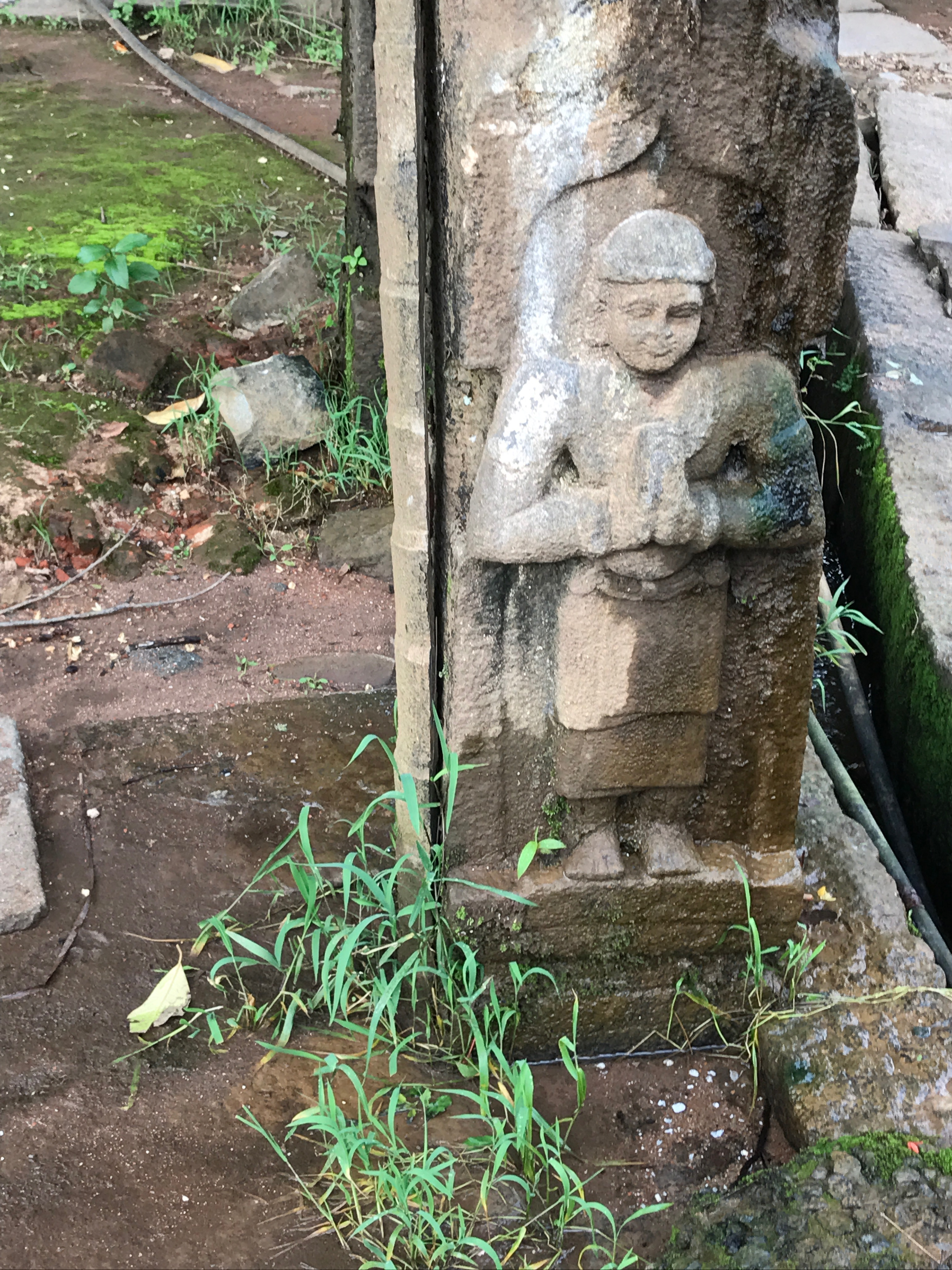
Entrance pillar relief (Thrichittatt Maha Vishnu Temple, Chengannur, Kerala).

== Anjali mudra ==
The gesture of folding hands during a namaste is called the Añjali Mudrā. In addition to namaste, this mudra is one of the postures found in Indian classical dance such as Bharatanatyam, and in yoga practice. It is widely found in Indian temple reliefs and sculpture in mandapam, at entrances and iconography such as the Lingobhavamurti of Shaivism. The Anjali mudra differs from namaste by being a non-verbal gesture, while namaste can be said with or without any gesture. According to Bhaumik and Govil, the Anjali mudra and Namaskara mudra are very similar but have a subtle difference. The back of the thumbs in Anjali mudra face the chest and are perpendicular to other fingers, while the thumbs in Namaskara mudra are aligned with the other fingers.

Anjali mudra is described in Sanskrit texts such as in verse 9.127–128 of the Natya Shastra (200 BCE – 200 CE), in temple architecture texts dated after the sixth-century CE such as in verse 5.67 of the Devata murti prakarana and those on painting called the Citrasutras. The Natya Shastra, a classical Indian dance text, describes it to be a posture where the two hands are folded together in a reverential state and that this is used to pray before a deity, receive any person one reveres and also to greet friends. The Natya Shastra further states that for prayers inside a temple, the Anjali mudra should be placed near one's head or above, while meeting someone venerable it is placed in front of one's face or chin, and for friends near one's chest.

== Uses ==
=== Greeting ===
Añjali Mudrā is widely used throughout the Indian subcontinent, parts of Asia and beyond where people of South and Southeast Asian origins have migrated. Namaste is a respectful form of greeting, acknowledging and welcoming a relative, guest or stranger. In some contexts, namaste is used by one person to express gratitude for assistance offered or given, and to thank the other person for their generous kindness.

Since namaste is a non-contact form of greeting, some world leaders adopted the gesture as an alternative to hand shaking during the 2020 Coronavirus pandemic as a means to prevent the spread of the virus.

World leaders adopting Namaste during COVID-19

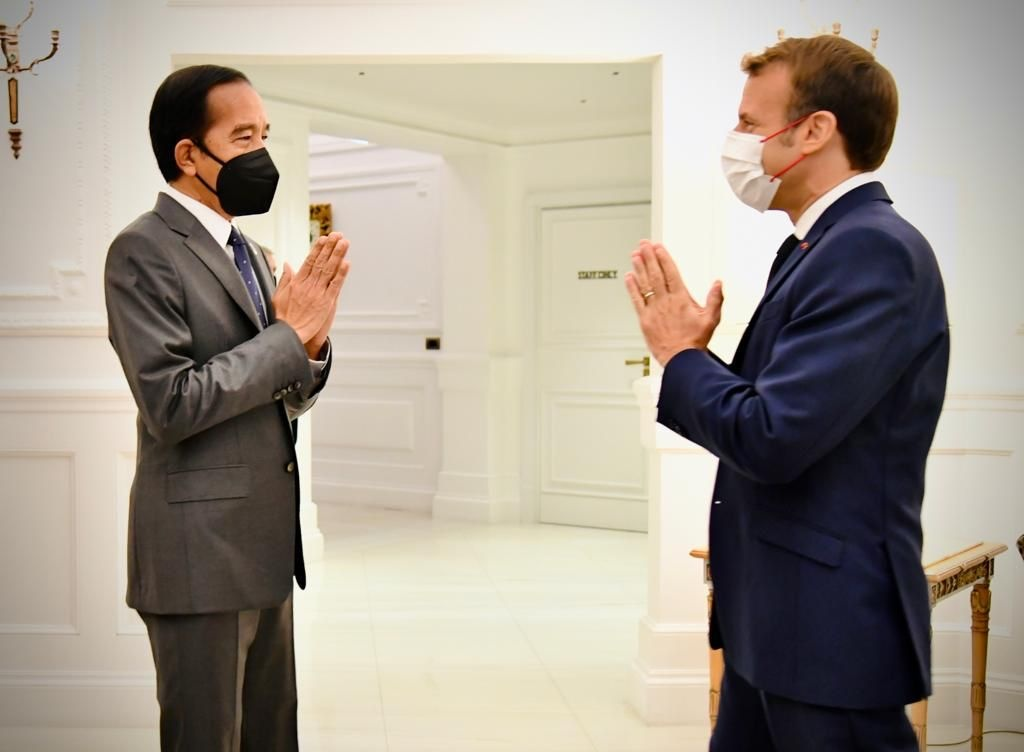

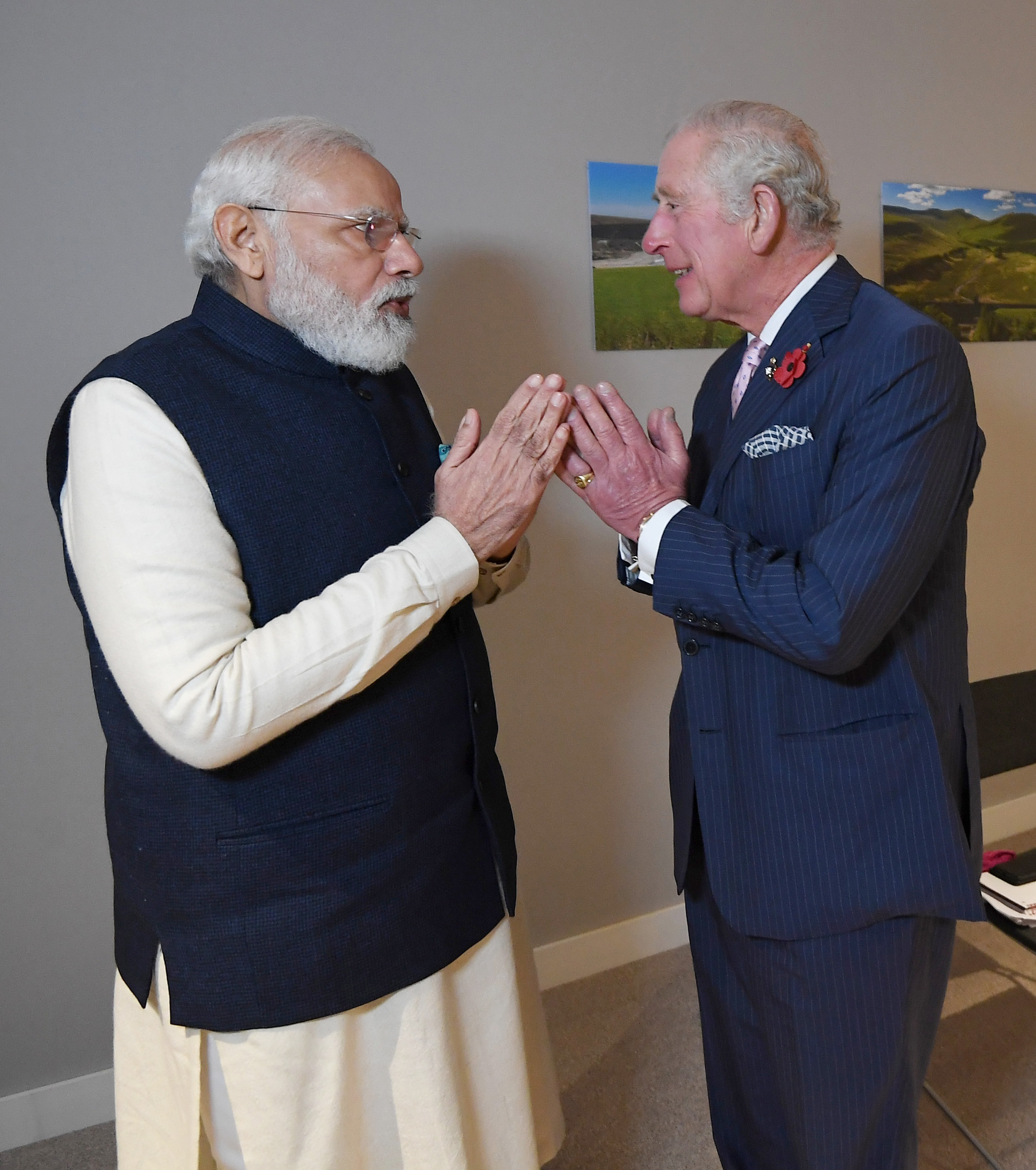

=== Hindu veneration practice ===
Namaskara is one of the 16 upacharas (veneration practices) used in temples and places of formal puja (worship). Namaste in the context of deity worship, scholars conclude, has the same function as in greeting a guest or anyone else. It expresses politeness, courtesy, honor, and hospitality from one person to the other. It is used in goodbyes as well. This is sometimes expressed, in ancient Hindu scriptures such as Taittiriya Upanishad, as Atithi Devo Bhava (literally, treat the guest like a god). Namaskara is one of the six forms of pranāma, and in parts of India these terms are used synonymously.

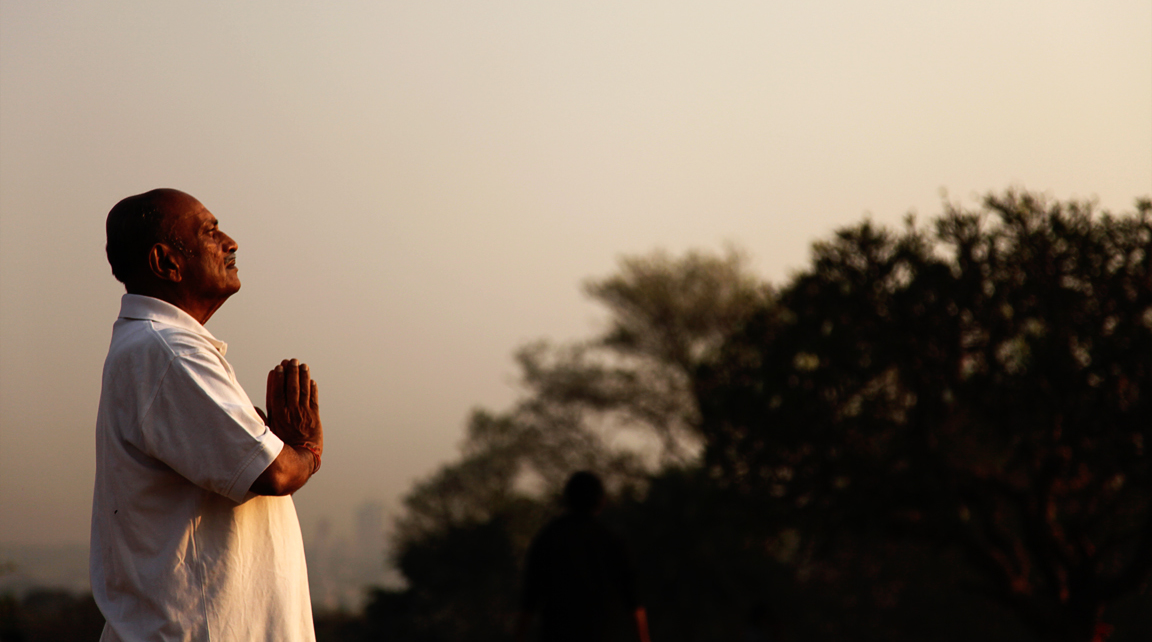
A Hindu man making the Añjali Mudrā

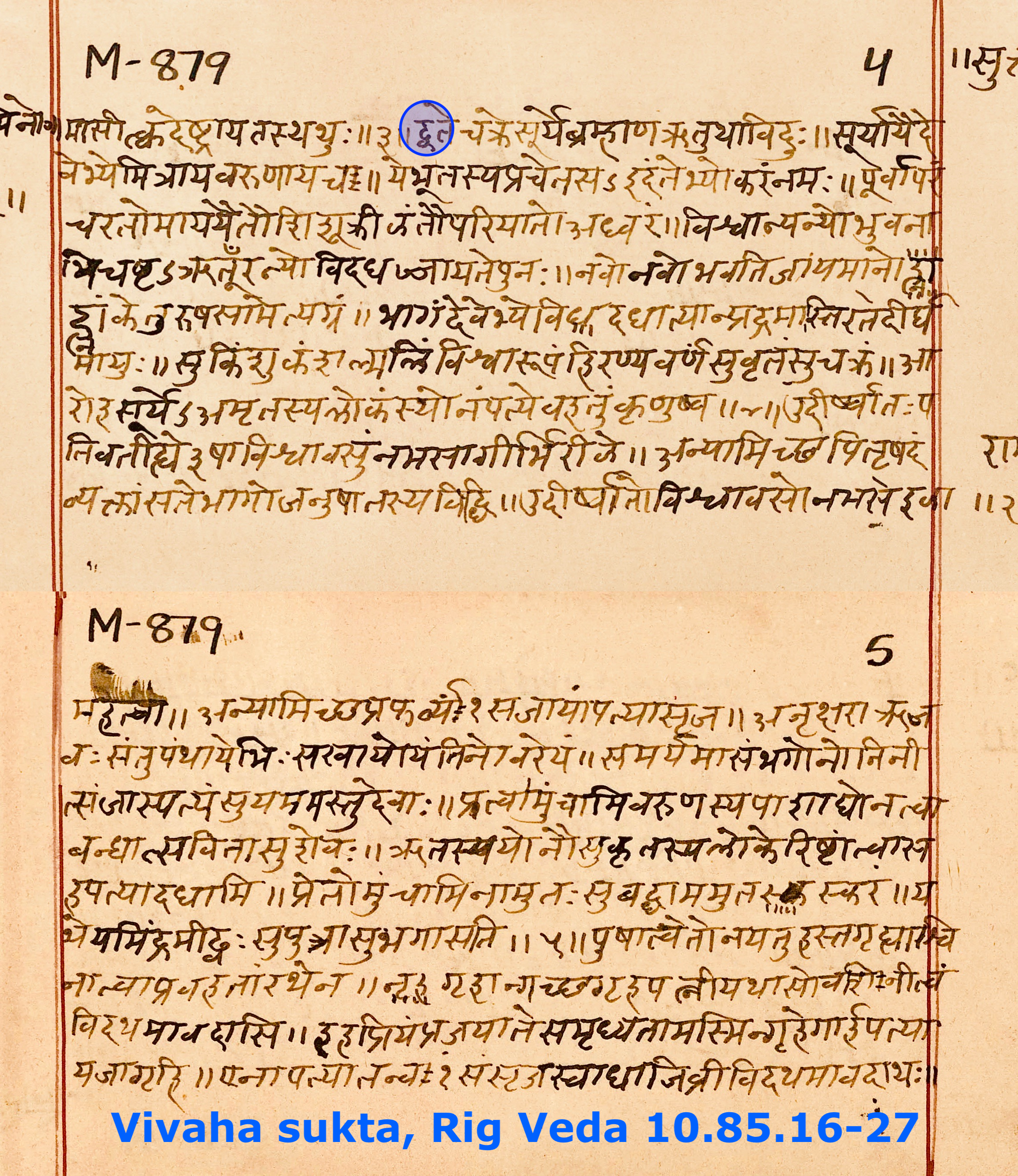
The ninth line from the top, last word in the Rigveda manuscript above is namas in the sense of "reverential worship"

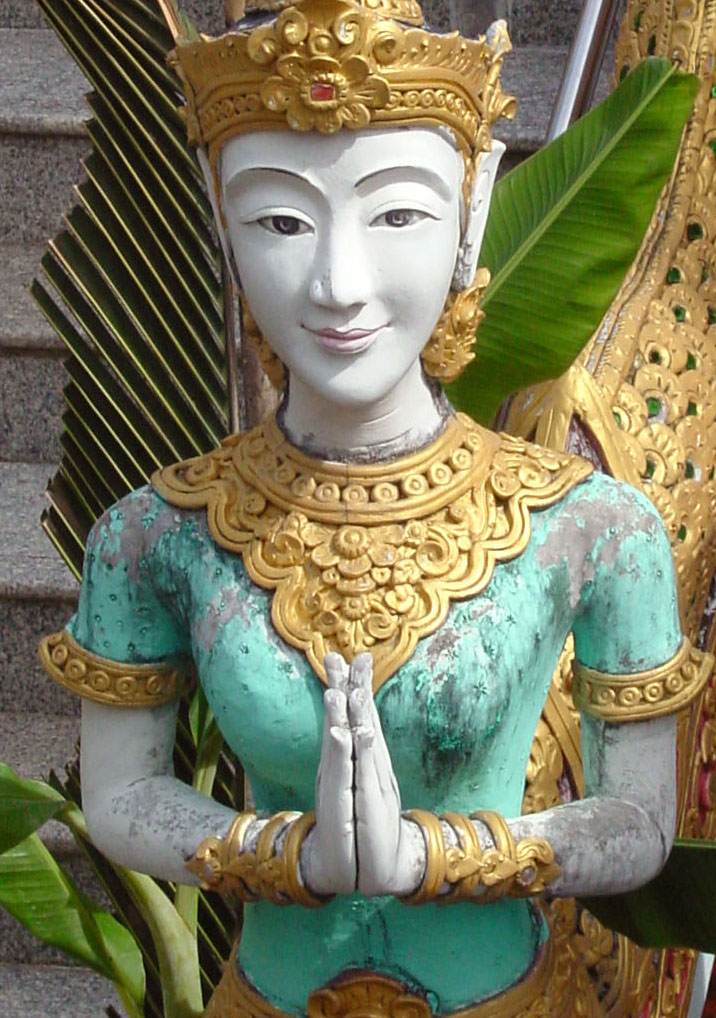
Wai gesture in a Thai temple

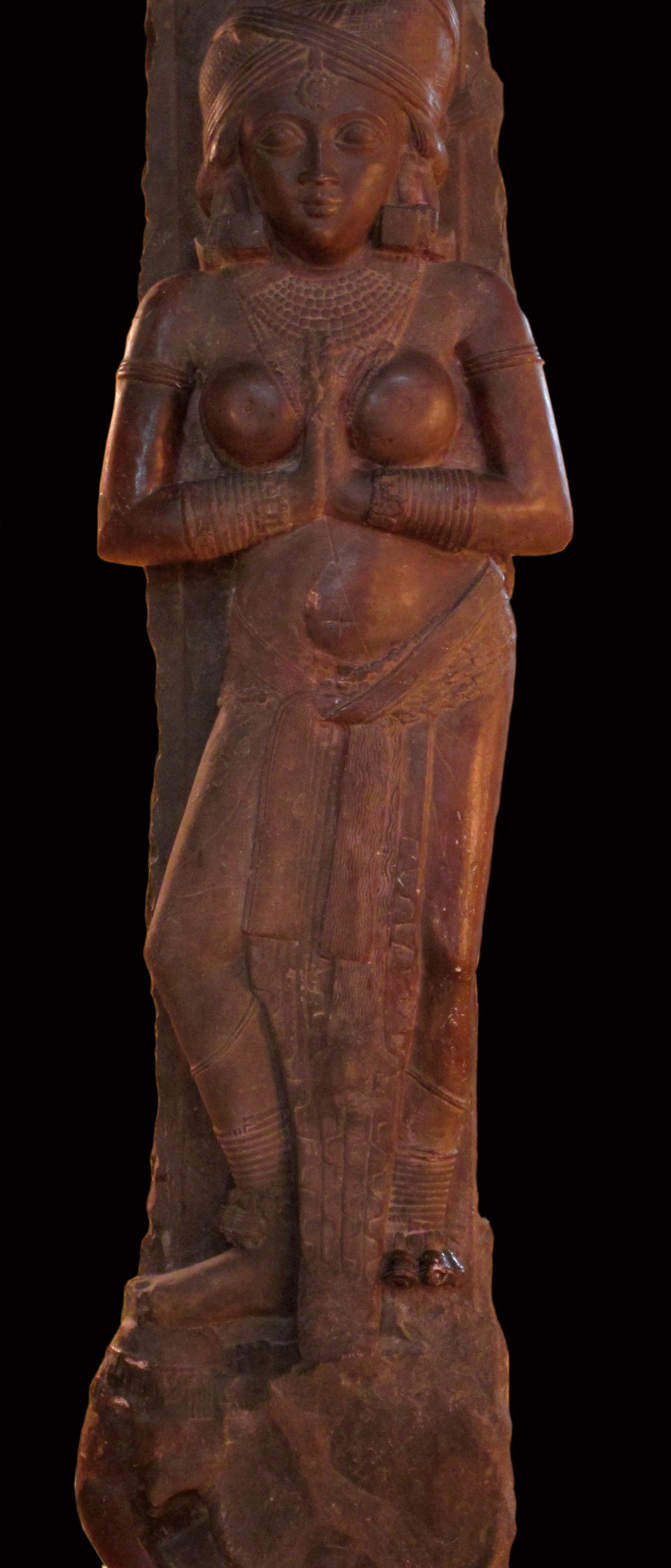
Yakshi salabhanjika, c. 100 BCE, Satna, Madhya Pradesh

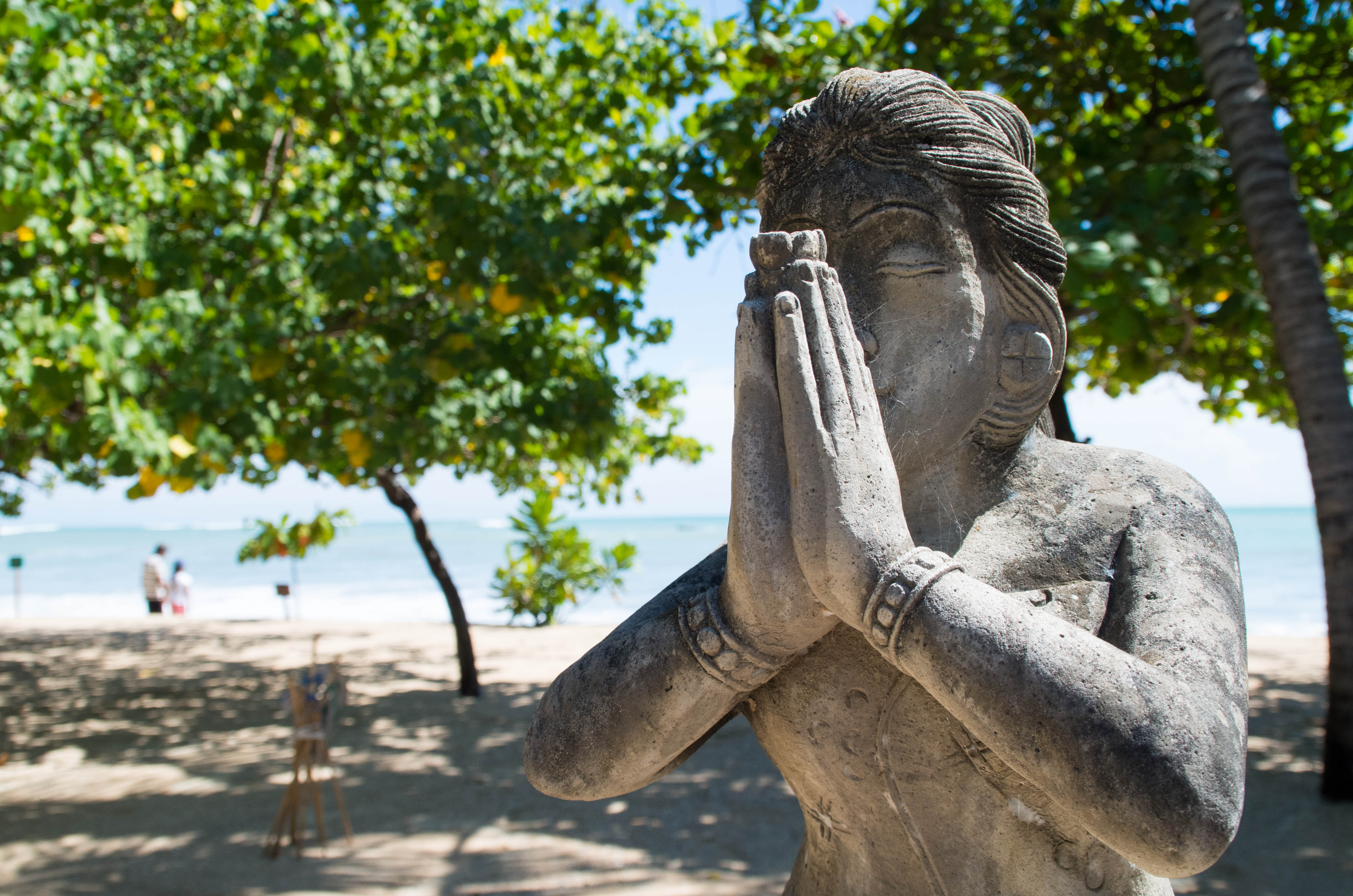
Statue in Bali, Indonesia

=== In modern yoga ===
It's the end of a typical yoga class. The teacher sits cross-legged, takes their hands in a prayer position, and reverently intones namaste. Dutiful students whisper namaste in unison in return without understanding the meaning of namaste.

'Namaste' has been adopted in modern yoga as exercise as a respectful word, spoken in unison at the end of a class, or by a solitary practitioner as a personal meditation; from there, it has become a T-shirt slogan. The Indian-born journalist Neha Tandon writes that nobody "buys a 'Namaste in bed' shirt with ill intentions", though in her view that does not excuse what she considers to be the evident cultural appropriation. The British Pakistani yoga teacher Nadia Gilani writes that the western pronunciation "nama-stay" is incorrect; South Asians pronounce it "num us teh", while the association of 'namaste' with yoga is a modern western invention. Rita Geno, writing in Yoga Journal, calls the usage "at the very least, puzzling"; it quotes the Indian yoga therapist Susanna Barkataki as saying it's a "rather formal" greeting, reserved for teachers and elders; it is not used to at a parting. Geno suggests that usage may be changing, quoting the author Deepak Singh as saying that the greeting was given to "every tourist" when he visited Rajasthan. On the other hand, T-shirt puns like "Nama'stay in bed" or "Namaslay" are, Geno writes, straightforwardly offensive, misusing a "respectful and spiritually resonant" term. As for use in a yoga class, the Indian American yoga teacher Aadil Palkhivala suggests that Namaste and Añjali Mudrā could be used both at the start, as a respectful greeting, and at the end, in gratitude and connection.

In modern yoga as exercise

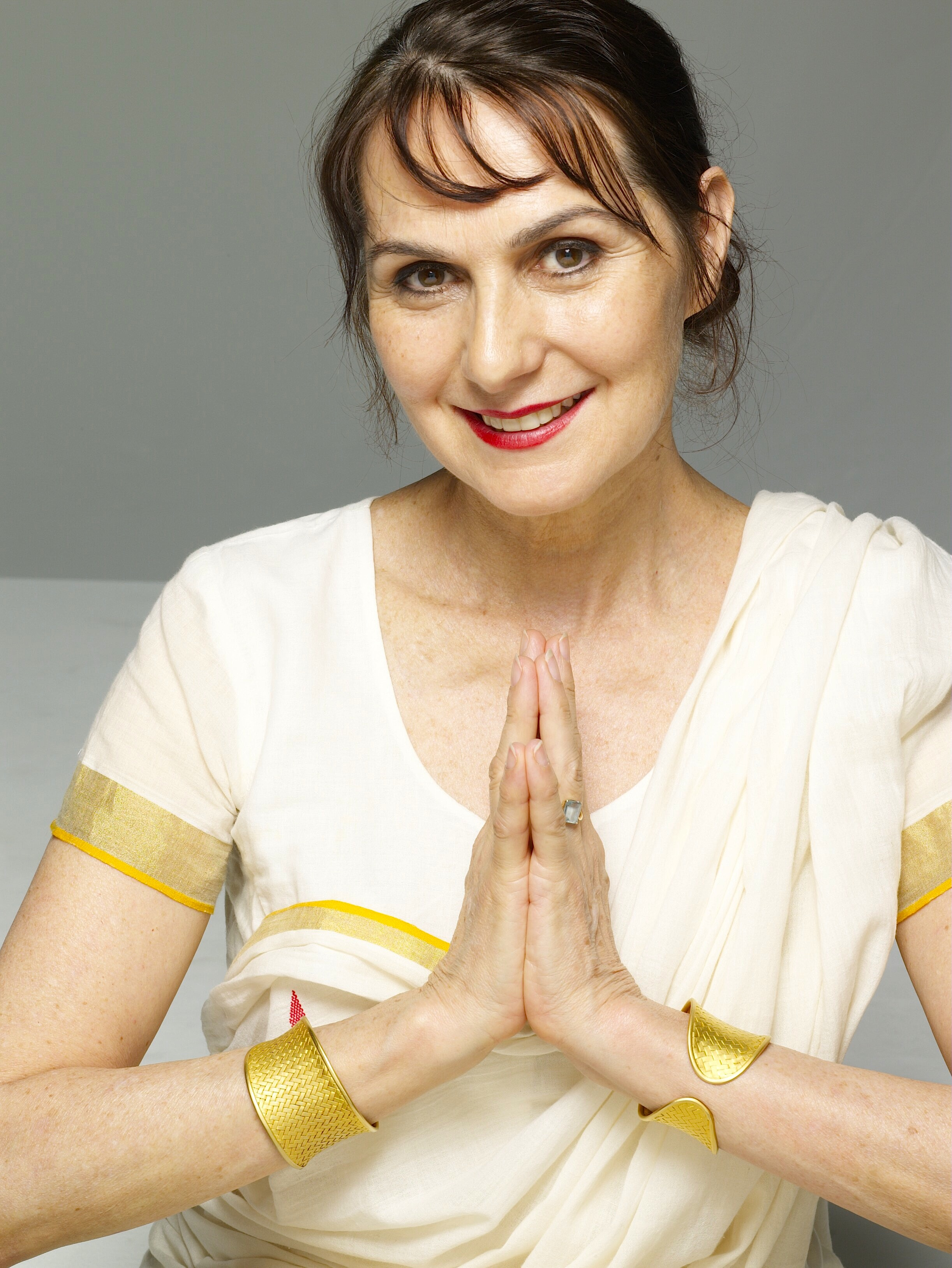
The modern yoga guru Sharon Gannon, co-founder of Jivamukti Yoga, making the Añjali Mudrā

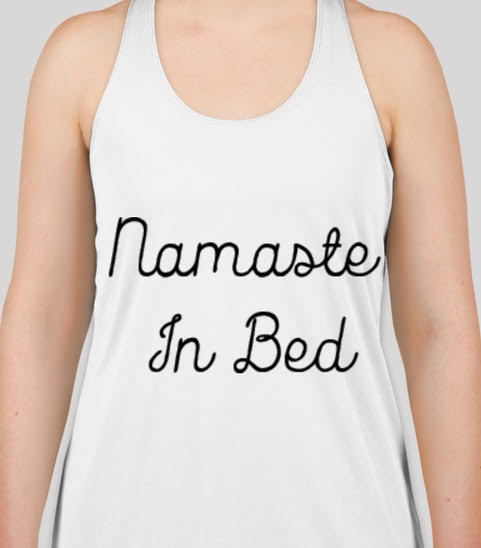
'Namaste' has been adopted in modern yoga as exercise as a respectful word, and less appropriately as a T-shirt slogan.

== See also ==
- Culture of India
- Gassho
- Sampeah
- Sat Sri Akal
- Sembah
- Wai
