= Mingalaba =

Salutation or greeting

Mingalaba (Burmese: မင်္ဂလာပါ, MLCTS: mangga.lapa IPA: [miɰ̃ɡəlàbà]; variously romanised as mingalarpar, mingalabar, or mingalar par) is the formal Burmese greeting. It is typically accompanied by a slight bow, or more formally, an Añjali Mudrā gesture, wherein the palms are folded together. The phrase "mingalaba" is typically rendered in English as "may you be blessed" or "auspiciousness to you."

== Origins ==
The greeting mingalaba is a relatively modern creation. The phrase first emerged during British rule in Burma in the 19th to 20th centuries, coined as a Burmese language equivalent to 'hello' or 'how are you.' In the late 1960s, the Burmese government institutionalized the phrase in the country's educational system. Burmese pupils now greet their teachers with mingalaba at the beginning of each school day.

Mingalaba itself is a phrase, decomposed into mingala + ba. The first word "mingala" (မင်္ဂလာ) originates from the Pāli term maṅgala, which means auspicious, lucky, prosperous, or festive. The word also appears in a well-known Buddhist scripture called the Maṅgala Sutta. Burmese culture recognizes Twelve Auspicious Rites or "Mingala." In Burmese, "mingala" is affixed to several Burmese terms, including "to wed" (မင်္ဂလာဆောင်) and "housewarming" (အိမ်တက်မင်္ဂလာ). The second word, "ba" (ပါ), is a grammatical particle suffixed to Burmese verbs to denote politeness.

== See also ==
- Mangala Sutta
- Awgatha
- Burmese culture
- Gadaw
- Thai greeting
- Añjali Mudrā
- Twelve Auspicious Rites
