= Greeting =

Expression to acknowledge another person

Translations of the word welcome shown in many places frequented by foreigners or tourists to welcome people of all different nationalities

Greeting is an act of communication in which human beings intentionally make their presence known to each other, to show attention to, and to suggest a type of relationship (usually cordial) or social status (formal or informal) between individuals or groups of people coming in contact with each other. Greetings are sometimes used just prior to a conversation or to greet in passing, such as on a sidewalk or trail. Greetings exist in all known human cultures.

Greeting customs are highly culture- and situation-specific. Greetings may change within a culture depending on social status, relationship, and etiquette. They can be expressed both audibly and physically, often involving a combination of the two. Greetings expressed in written communications, such as letters and emails, are known as salutations. Some languages and cultures have words and gestures that may be used for both greetings and farewells.

Some epochs and cultures have had very elaborate greeting rituals, e.g. greeting a sovereign. Conversely, secret societies have often furtive or arcane greeting gestures and rituals, such as a secret handshake, which allows members to recognize each other. This topic excludes military and ceremonial salutes, but includes rituals other than gestures.

== Greeting gestures ==
=== Greeting gestures in Western cultures ===
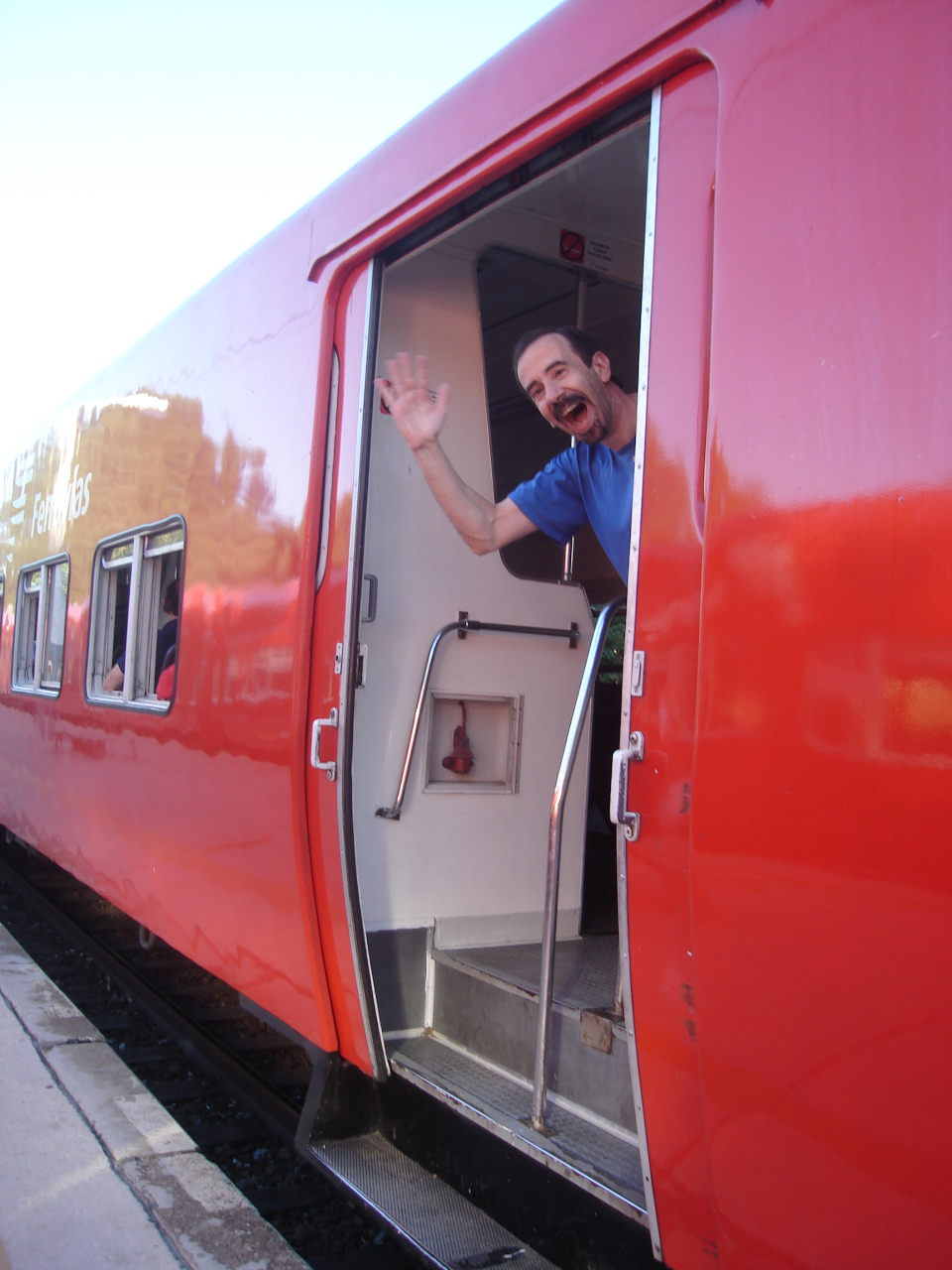
Waving

Many different gestures are used throughout the world as simple greetings. In Western cultures, the handshake is very common, though it has numerous subtle variations in the strength of grip, the vigour of the shake, the dominant position of one hand over the other, and whether or not the left hand is used.

The formal greeting may involve a verbal acknowledgment and sometimes a handshake, but beyond that, facial expression, gestures, body language, and eye contact can all signal what type of greeting is expected. Gestures are the most obvious signal, for instance, greeting someone with open arms is generally a sign that a hug is expected. However, crossing arms can be interpreted as a sign of hostility. The facial expression, body language, and eye contact reflect emotions and interest level. A frown, slouching and lowered eye contact suggests disinterest, while smiling and an exuberant attitude is a sign of welcome.

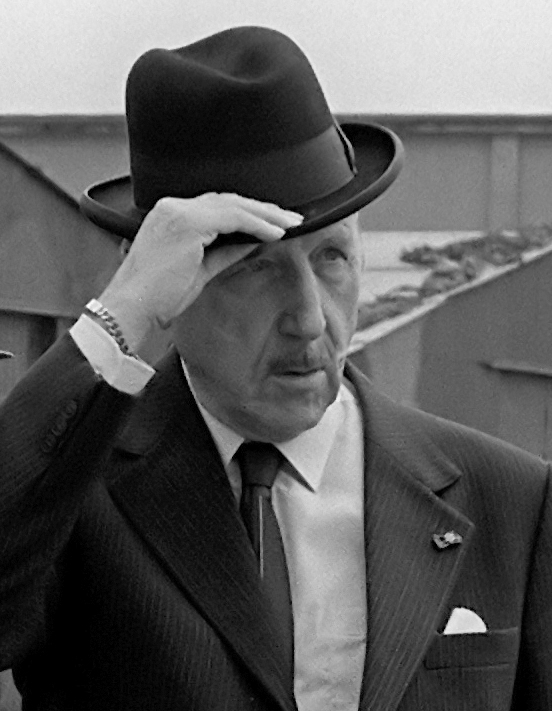
The civilian Secretary General of NATO Joseph Luns from the Netherlands tips his hat at a troop review in 1983, in lieu of a military salute. This (the full gesture is shown here) was by then becoming old-fashioned as a general social greeting, but had once been normal.

Historically, when men normally wore hats out of doors, male greetings to people they knew, and sometimes those they did not, involved touching, raising slightly ("hat tipping"), or removing their hat in a variety of gestures. This basic gesture remained normal in very many situations from the Middle Ages until men typically ceased wearing hats in the mid-20th century. Hat-raising began with an element of recognition of superiority, where only the socially inferior party might perform it, but gradually lost this element; King Louis XIV of France made a point of at least touching his hat to all women he encountered. However, the gesture was never used by women, for whom their head-covering included considerations of modesty. When a man was not wearing a hat he might touch his hair to the side of the front of his head to replicate a hat-tipping gesture. This was typically performed by lower classmen to social superiors, such as peasants to the land-owner, and is known as "tugging the forelock", which still sometimes occurs as a metaphor for submissive behaviour.

Among Christians in certain parts of the world such as Poland, the greeting phrase "Praise the Lord" has had common usage, especially in the pre-World War II era.

=== Kisses ===
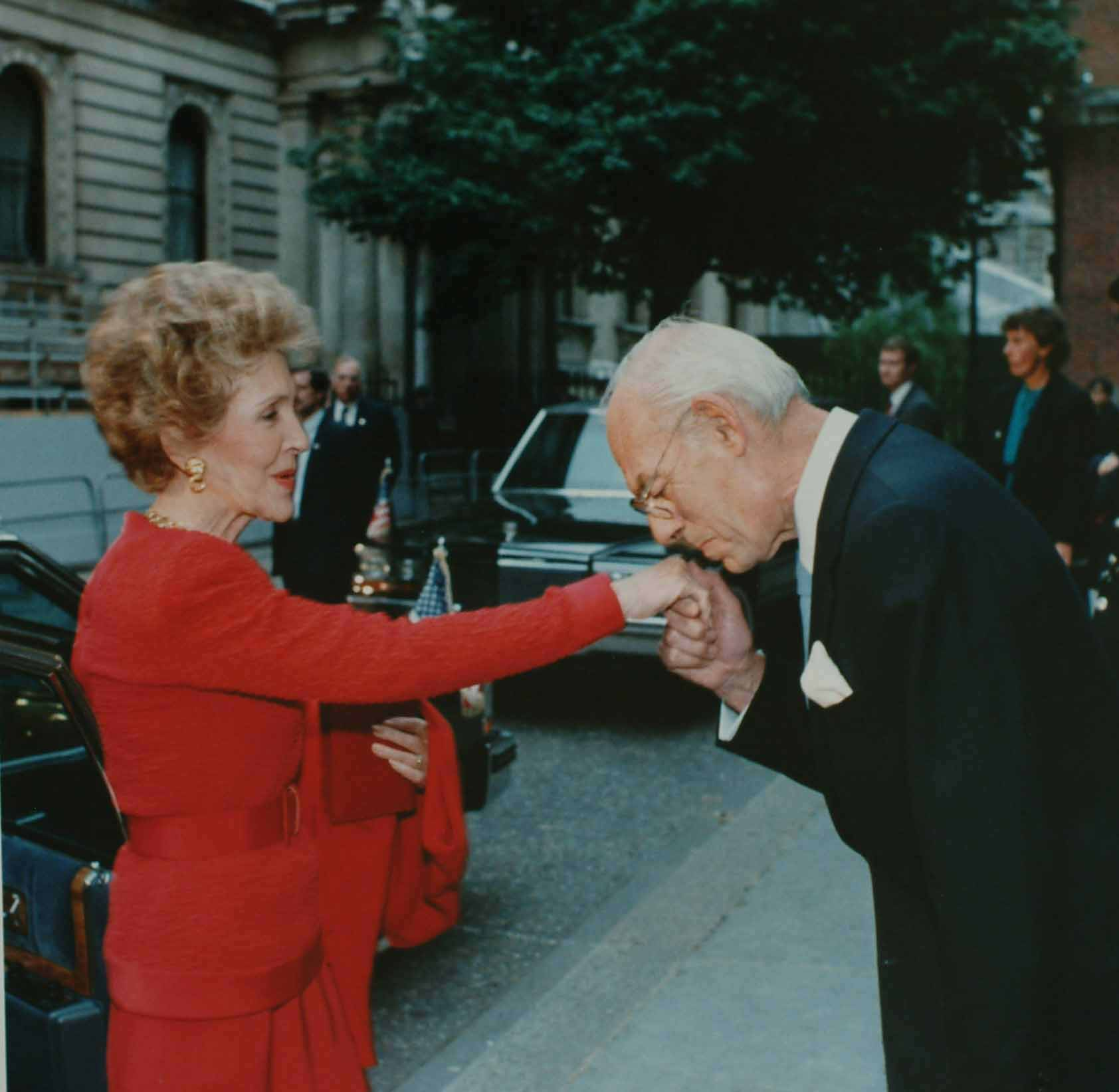
Denis Thatcher, husband of former Prime Minister of the United Kingdom Margaret Thatcher, greets former American First Lady Nancy Reagan by kissing her hand, 1988.

In Europe, the formal style of upper-class greeting used by a man to a woman in the Early Modern Period was to hold the woman's presented hand (usually the right) with his right hand and kiss it while bowing. In cases of a low degree of intimacy, the hand is held but not kissed. The ultra-formal style, with the man's right knee on the floor, is now only used in marriage proposals, as a romantic gesture.

Cheek kissing is common in Europe, parts of Canada (Quebec) and Latin America and has become a standard greeting mainly in Southern Europe but also in some Central European countries.

While cheek kissing is a common greeting in many cultures, each country has a unique way of kissing. In Russia, Poland, Slovenia, Serbia, Macedonia, Montenegro, the Netherlands, Iran and Egypt it is customary to "kiss three times, on alternate cheeks". Italians, Spanish, Hungarian, Romanians, Bosnia-and-Herzegovinans usually kiss twice in a greeting and in Mexico and Belgium only one kiss is necessary. In the Galapagos women kiss on the right cheek only and in Oman, it is not unusual for men to kiss one another on the nose after a handshake. French culture accepts a number of ways to greet depending on the region. Two kisses are most common throughout all of France but in Provence three kisses are given and in Nantes four are exchanged. However, in Finistère at the western tip of Brittany and Deux-Sèvres in the Poitou-Charentes region, one kiss is preferred.

=== Greeting gestures in Asian cultures ===
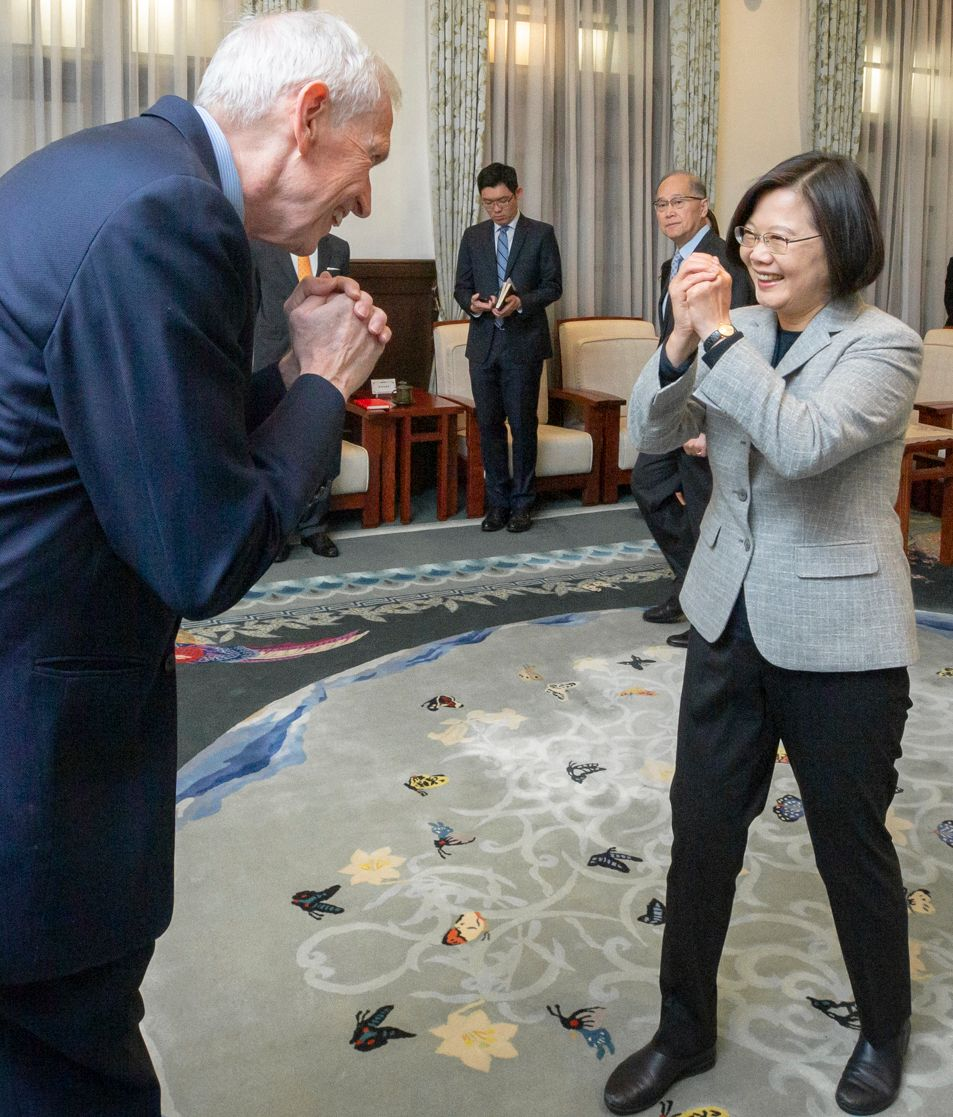
Chinese greeting (Fist-and-palm) practised by Tsai Ing-wen, President of the Republic of China (Taiwan)

The most common Chinese greeting, Gongshou, features the right fist placed in the palm of the left hand and both shaken back and forth two or three times, it may be accompanied by a head nod or bowing. The gesture may be used on meeting and parting, and when congratulating, thanking, or apologizing.

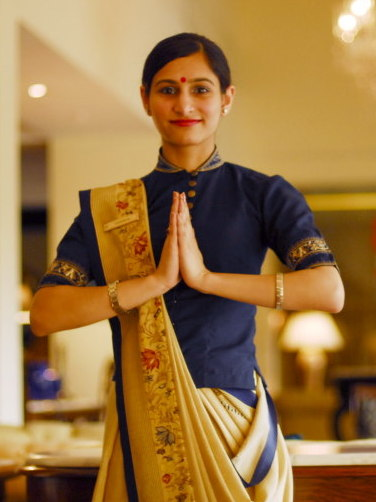
Namaste greeting – a common cultural practice in India

In India, it is common to see the Namaste greeting (or "Sat Sri Akal" for Sikhs) where the palms of the hands are pressed together and held near the heart with the head gently bowed.

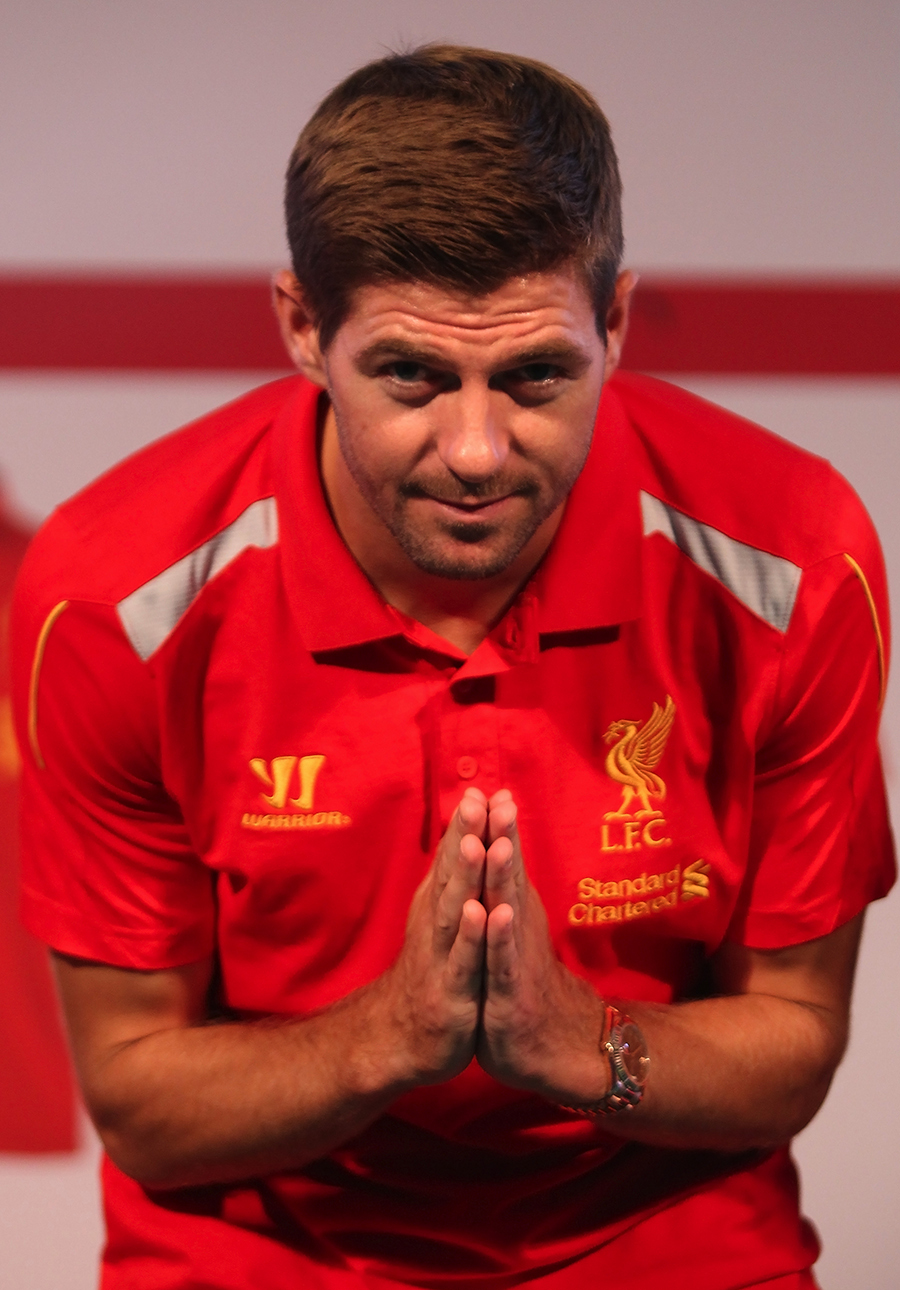
Steven Gerrard performing a Wai

In Thailand, a wai is a gesture where the hands are placed together palm to palm, approximately at nose level, while bowing. The wai is similar in form to the gesture referred to by the Japanese term gassho by Buddhists. In Thailand, the men and women would usually press two palms together and bow a little while saying "Sawadee ka" (female speaker) or "Sawadee krap" (male speaker).

=== Greeting gestures in Muslim cultures ===
The Arabic term salaam (literally "peace", from the spoken greeting that accompanies the gesture), refers to the practice of placing the right palm on the heart, before and after a handshake.

In Moroccan society, same-sex people do not greet each other the same as do opposite sex. While same-sex people (men or women) will shake hands, kiss on the cheek and even hug multiple times, a man and woman greeting each other in public will not go further than a handshake. This is due to Moroccan culture being conservative. Verbal greetings in Morocco can go from a basic salaam, to asking about life details to make sure the other person is doing well. In the kingdom of Morocco, the greeting should always be made with the right hand, as the left hand is traditionally considered unclean.

Adab, meaning respect and politeness, is a hand gesture used as a secular greeting in South Asia, especially of Urdu-speaking communities of Uttar Pradesh, Hyderabad, and Bengal in India, as well as among the Muhajir people of Pakistan. The gesture involves raising the right hand towards the face with palm inwards such that it is in front of the eyes and the fingertips are almost touching the forehead, as the upper torso is bent forward. It is typical for the person to say "adab arz hai", or just "adab". It is often answered with the same or the word "Tasleem" is said as an answer or sometimes it is answered with a facial gesture of acceptance.

=== Greeting gestures in Indonesia ===
In Indonesia, a nation with a huge variety of cultures and religions, many greetings are expressed, from the formalized greeting of the highly stratified and hierarchical Javanese to the more egalitarian and practical greetings of outer islands.

Javanese, Batak and other ethnicities currently or formerly involved in the armed forces will salute a government-employed superior, and follow with a deep bow from the waist or short nod of the head and a passing, loose handshake. Hand position is highly important; the superior's hand must be higher than the inferior's. Muslim men will clasp both hands, palms together at the chest and utter the correct Islamic slametan (greeting) phrase, which may be followed by cheek-to-cheek contact, a quick hug or loose handshake. Pious Muslim women rotate their hands from a vertical to the perpendicular prayer-like position to barely touch the fingertips of the male greeter and may opt-out of the cheek-to-cheek contact.

If the male is an Abdi Dalem royal servant, courtier or particularly "peko-peko" (taken directly from Japanese to mean obsequious) or even a highly formal individual, he will retreat backward with head downcast, the left arm crossed against the chest and the right arm hanging down, never showing his side or back to his superior. His head must always be lower than that of his superior. Younger Muslim males and females will clasp their elder's or superior's outstretched hand to the forehead as a sign of respect and obeisance.

If a manual worker or a person with obviously dirty hands salute or greets an elder or superior, he will show deference to his superior and avoid contact by bowing, touching the right forehead in a very quick salute or a distant "slamet" gesture.

The traditional Javanese Sungkem involves clasping the palms of both hands together, aligning the thumbs with the nose, turning the head downward and bowing deeply, bending from the knees. In a royal presence, the one performing sungkem would kneel at the base of the throne.

=== Other greeting gestures ===
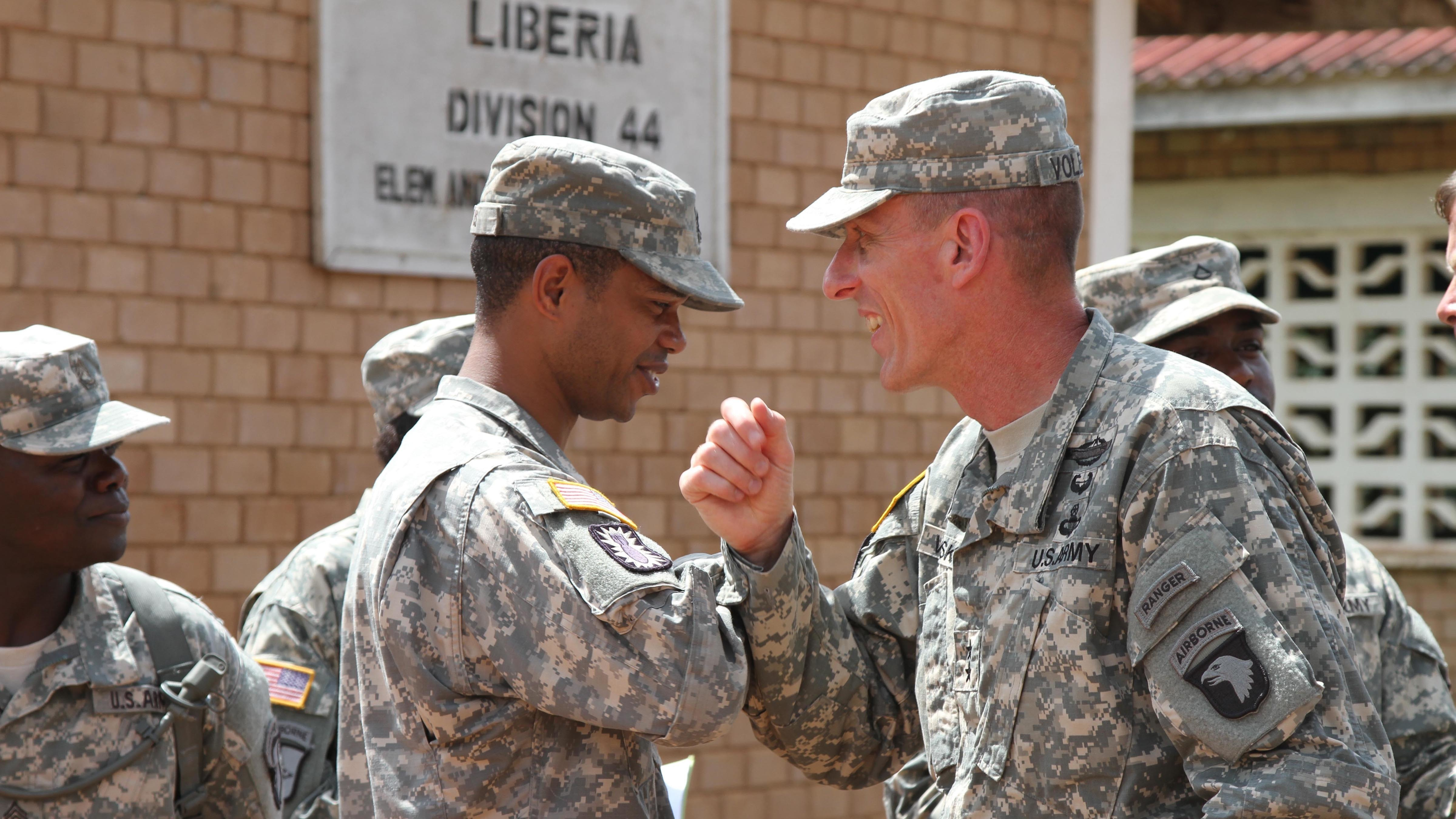
The commander of Operation United Assistance using an elbow bump greeting while combating Ebola in Liberia in 2014

- Eskimo kissing
- Fist bump, in which two individuals touch fists
- High-five
- Kowtow
- Mano (gesture)
- Pranāma
- Pressing noses
- Salute
- Sampeah
- Tehniyat
- Vanakkam
- Giving dap

== Spoken greetings ==
A spoken greeting or verbal greeting is a customary or ritualised word or phrase used to introduce oneself or to greet someone. Greeting habits are highly culture- and situation-specific and may change within a culture depending on social status.

Some examples of colexified greetings which can also be used as valedictions include "Good day" in English, "Drud" in Persian, "Sat Shri Akaal" in Punjabi, "As-salamu alaykum" in Arabic, "Aloha" in Hawaiian, "Shalom" in Hebrew, "Namaste" in Hindi, "Ayubowan" in Sri Lanka, "Sawatdi" in Thai and "Ciao" in Italian.

=== Spoken greetings in English ===
In English, some common verbal greetings are:

- "Hello", "hi", and "hey" — General verbal greetings. The latter two are less formal. According to the Oxford English Dictionary, the first citation of "hey" is found as early as 1225, and is defined as "a call to attract attention . . . an exclamation to express exultation . . . or surprise." The English language's other monosyllabic greeting, "Hi", is actually much newer, having become popular in the 1920s. Many languages use the word as a greeting, though a variety of spellings exist, including "hei" and "hej".
- "Good morning", "good afternoon", "good evening" — More formal verbal greetings used at the appropriate time of day, often made informal through the omission of the word "good". The similar "good night" and the now extremely formal "good day" are more commonly used as phrases of parting rather than greeting, although in Australian English "G'day" is a very common greeting.
- "What's up?", "How's it going?" and "What's happening?" — informal greetings used frequently.
- "How do you do?" Has two usages, depending on the country. For example in Ireland it should be treated as a salutation, whereas in England it should be treated as a question that requires an answer.
- "Howdy" — Informal greeting. Derived from "how do you do," it is common in the rural regions of the United States.
- "All right?" or "You all right?", the consonants often elided to give "a'ight?" — a relatively new and very informal greeting.

=== Voicemail greetings ===
Voicemail greetings are pre-recorded messages that are automatically played to callers when the answering machine or voicemail system answers the call. Some systems allow for different greetings to be played to different callers.

=== Musical greetings ===
In rural Burundi, familiar women greet each other in a complex interlocking vocal rhythm called akazehe, regardless of the meeting's contextual occasion or time.

=== Other spoken greetings ===
- Grüß Gott
- Hare Krishna
- Mahalo
- Paschal greeting
- Tashi Delek

== Written greetings ==
A salutation is a greeting used in a letter or other communication. Salutations can be formal or informal. The most common form of salutation in an English letter includes the recipient's given name or title. For each style of salutation, there is an accompanying style of complimentary close, known as valediction. Examples of non-written salutations include bowing (common in Japan), waving, or addressing someone by their name. A salutation can be interpreted as a signal in which the receiver of the salutation is being acknowledged, respected, or thanked. Another simple but typical example of a salutation is a military salute. By saluting another rank, that person is signalling or showing their acknowledgement of the importance or significance of that person and their rank. Some greetings are considered vulgar, others "rude", and others "polite".
