= Sandro J. Stadelmann =

Austrian real estate entrepreneur

- Occupation: Real estate entrepreneur
- Known for: Founder of Stadelmann Real Estate; Privé App

Sandro Julian Stadelmann (born 2 November 1989 in Bregenz, Austria) is an Austrian entrepreneur from Vorarlberg. He is the founder of Stadelmann Real Estate and Privé App, a digital platform for listing holiday and off-market properties.

== Early life and career ==
Stadelman was born on 2 November 1989 in Bregenz, Austria.

Stadelmann trained as an electrician and served in the Austrian Armed Forces.

Stadelmann participated in the Mister Austria 2015 and was placed third. He appeared in the show Die Wüstenköniginnen on SAT1 as Mister Immo.

Stadelmann began his real estate career in 2011. He founded Stadelmann Exclusive S.L. which operates in Mallorca.

Stadelmann appeared in ORF documentary Arm und Reich. He has also appeared on SAT1 reality series. He has been featured on ServusTV.

In 2025, he founded Privé App.
