= Khuda Hafiz =

Persian parting phrase

Khuda Hafiz (Persian: خدا حافظ, romanized: Xudā Ḥāfiẓ, lit. 'may God be your Guardian'), also known as Khudafiz, is a common parting phrase originating from the Persian language.

It is most commonly used in Iran, Afghanistan, Tajikistan, and in the Indian subcontinent (mostly by Muslims), where it is also sometimes used by non-Muslims including some Christians and Zoroastrians (including Parsis). Additionally it is also used by some Azeris, Kurds, and Jews of Iranian heritage.

== Meaning ==
The meaning is translated as: "may God be your Guardian". Khuda, which is Persian for God, and hafiz which is the Arabic word for "protector" or "guardian". The vernacular translation is, "goodbye". The phrase is used widely in Indo-Iranian and other nearby languages. It also can be defined as: "may God be your protector".

Other transliterations also include Khudā Hāfiz, Khodâ Hâfez, Khudā Hāfez and Khodā Hāfiz. The English term "goodbye" (which is a contraction of God be with ye) has similar meanings.

== Variations ==
A variation of this Khuda Hafiz includes Allah Hafiz which became prevalent in Pakistan after Pakistani Prime Minister Zia-ul-Haq's Islamization and in Bangladesh; in a way to counter Persianate influence and focus more on Arabic-oriented Islamic influence.

In Pakistan, this variation was used as a counter to the original Khuda Hafiz. Despite the word Allah being Arabic, it is not used as a parting phrase in the Arab world, where Ma'a Salamah (مع ٱسلامة) is said.

== See also ==
- Valedictions
  - Aloha
  - As-salamu alaykum
  - Ciao
  - Namaste
  - Sat Sri Akaal
  - Shalom
- God
  - Khuda (خدا)
  - Allah (الله)
