= Grüß Gott =

Greeting in Southern Germany and Austria

The expression grüß Gott (German pronunciation: [ɡʁyːs ɡɔt]; from grüß dich Gott, originally '(may) God bless (you)') is a greeting, less often a farewell, in Southern Germany and Austria (more specifically the Upper German Sprachraum, especially in Bavaria, Franconia, Swabia, Austria, and South Tyrol).

== German-language use ==
The greeting, along with its variants, has long been the most common greeting in Southern Germany and Austria, centered in Schwaben more than Baden or Bavaria.

It is sometimes misunderstood by speakers from other regions to mean the imperative greet God(!) and therefore sometimes receives a sarcastic response from Northern (and thus mainly Protestant) Germans, such as "If I see Him" (Wenn ich Ihn sehe) or "Hopefully not too soon" (Hoffentlich nicht so bald). Grüß Gott is, however, the shortened form of both (es) grüße dich Gott and its plural (es) grüße euch Gott "may God greet you". In addition, in Middle High German, the verb grüßen (grüezen) is used to mean not only "to greet" but also "to bless", so that the original meaning of the phrase is in fact "God bless you". Speakers in Southern Germany and Austria are often unaware of this and take it to mean "may God greet you". It is not equivalent to the English usage of "God bless you".

Like many other greetings, grüß Gott can range in meaning from deeply emotional to casual or perfunctory. The greeting's pronunciation varies with the region, with, for example, grüß dich sometimes shortened to grüß di (the variation grüß di Gott may be heard in some places). In Bavaria and Austria griaß di and griaß eich are commonly heard, although their Standard German equivalents are not uncommon either. In Switzerland, grüezi is a common greeting also descended from this phrase. A common farewell analogous to grüß Gott is pfiat di Gott, a contraction of "behüte dich Gott" ('God protect you'), which itself is not common at all. This is likewise shortened this to pfiat di/eich or, if the person is addressed formally pfiat Gott in Altbayern, Austria, and South Tyrol (Italy).

In its standard German form, grüß Gott is mostly stressed on the second word. In many places it is used not only in everyday life, but also in official state communications. Use of the greeting guten Tag ('good day') is less prevalent, but there are those who dislike grüß Gott on account of its religious nature. In Bavaria, guten Tag is considered prim and distant and sometimes leads to misunderstandings.

== Comparison with greetings of religious origin in other languages ==
Other languages also include greetings based on Christian religious terms:

- In Irish, the popular greeting is Dia dhuit (singular) or Dia dhaoibh (plural, meaning "God with you" in both cases), similar to the English "goodbye", a contraction of God be with ye; today, "goodbye" has a less obviously religious meaning.
- Catalan formal expression adéu-siau ("be with God", in archaic Catalan)
- A religious origin is still obvious in French adieu, Spanish adiós, Italian addio, Portuguese adeus, and Catalan adéu ("to God", probably a contraction of "I entrust you to God")
- In Finland, a religious group named Laestadians uses the form Jumalan terve ("God's greeting").
- In Portuguese-speaking world the very direct forms fique com Deus ("stay with God") and vai com Deus ("go with God") are very common today.
- In Croatian, there is an informal greeting of simply Bog! ("God!"). This is probably a shortened form of the expression Bog daj "[let] God give", which has become less common.
- In Croatian and Bulgarian, there is a more formal parting greeting of Zbogom or Сбогом! ([idi] s Bogom, "[go] with God").
- In Czech, zdař Bůh (literal Czech translation of grüß Gott), sometimes simplified as zdařbůh or zdařbů, acts as a historical greeting; its contemporary use is limited to miners.
- In Slovak, zdar Boh! (the literal Slovak translation of grüß Gott) is used as the traditional greeting of miners. An inscription of Zdar Boh! can be seen on many mine entrances, monuments or logos.
- In Romania, the greeting Doamne ajută, which means "God helps" or "God bless", is often used.
- In Turkish, traditional religious greetings and farewells include Selamünaleyküm (“Peace be upon you”), Allah’a ısmarladık (“I entrust you to God”), and Allaha emanet ol (“May God protect you”).
- In Arabic, the term حياك الله (Ḥayyāk Allāh "May God greet you") is a common greeting. In Levantine Arabic, a common way to say farewell is الله معك (Allāh maʿak "Godspeed").

== See also ==
- Greetings
- Moin
- Servus
