= Khuda =

Persian word for God

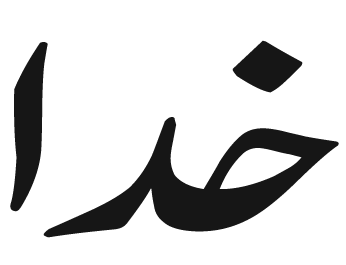
The word Khuda in Nastaliq script

Khuda (Persian: خدا, romanized: xudā, Early New Persian, Classical Persian and Dari pronunciation [xu.ˈdaː]) or Khoda, (xodâ, Iranian Persian pronunciation [xo.ˈdɒː]), is the Persian word for God.

Originally, it was used as a noun in reference to Ahura Mazda (the name of the God in Zoroastrianism). Iranian languages, Turkic languages, and many Indo-Aryan languages employ the word. Today, it is a word used to refer to God in general.

It has wide usage from its native country of Iran, along with Afghanistan, Tajikistan, Uzbekistan, Turkmenistan, Kyrgyzstan, Kazakhstan, Turkey, Azerbaijan, Bangladesh, and Pakistan; and many Muslim-majority areas of India, parts of Europe under the Ottoman Empire (especially the Balkans, such as Bosnia and Herzegovina, Albania, and Kosovo), as well as Armenia, Georgia, southern Ukraine and southern Russia.

== Etymology ==
The term derives from Middle Iranian terms xvatay, xwadag meaning "lord", "ruler", "master", appearing in written form in Parthian hwdʾy, in Middle Persian hwtʾy (𐭤𐭥𐭲𐭠𐭩), and in Sogdian hwdʾy. It is the Middle Persian reflex of older Iranian forms such as Avestan xᵛaδata (𐬓𐬀𐬜𐬀𐬙𐬀) "self-determined (in the sense "not dependent on anything/anyone"), self-defined; autocrat, despot, dictator" (cognate with Sanskrit svadhā́ (स्वधा) "custom, habit, natural state, inherent power" and svátavas (स्वतवस्) "valiant, inherently powerful"), an epithet of Ahura Mazda. Menog-i Khrad also has zaman-i derang xvatay "epithet of time", i.e., Zurvan. The Kurdish term Xwedê (خودێ) and the Pashto term Xdāi (خدائ) are both variants of this.

Prosaic usage is found for example in the Sassanid title katak-xvatay to denote the head of a clan or extended household or in the title of the 6th century Khwaday-Namag "Book of Lords", from which the tales of Kayanian dynasty as found in the Shahnameh derive.

It is a false cognate of the English word "God".

== Usage by religion ==
=== Zoroastrianism ===
Semi-religious usage appears, for example, in the epithet zaman-i derang xvatay (lit. 'time of the long dominion'), as found in the Menog-i Khrad. The fourth and eighty-sixth entries of the Pazend prayer titled 101 Names of God, Harvesp-Khoda (lit. 'Lord of All') and Khudawand (lit. 'Lord of the Universe'), respectively, are compounds involving Khuda. Application of Khuda as "the Lord" (Ahura Mazda) is represented in the first entry in the medieval Frahang-i Pahlavig.

=== Islam ===
In Islamic times, the term came to be used for God in Islam, paralleling the Arabic name of God al-Malik (lit. 'Owner, King, Lord, Master').

The phrase Khuda Hafiz (lit. 'may God be your Guardian') is a parting phrase commonly used in across the Greater Iran region, in languages including Persian, Balochi, Pashto, Azeri, and Kurdish. Furthermore, the term is also employed as a parting phrase in many languages across the Indian subcontinent including Hindi-Urdu, Punjabi, Saraiki, Deccani, Sindhi, Bengali, and Kashmiri.

It also exists as a popular loanword, used for God in Turkish (Hüdâ), Bengali (খোদা), Hindi-Urdu (ख़ुदा/خدا), Punjabi (ਖ਼ੁਦਾ/خدا), Kashmiri (خۄداے/خۄدا), Kazakh (Xuda/Quda/Qudaı), Uzbek (Xudo), Tatar (Ходай), Chinese (Chinese: 胡达 or 胡達; pinyin: húdá along with Chinese: 胡大; pinyin: húdà), and other Indo-Aryan and Turkic languages.

=== Christianity ===
The word Khuda is used by Iranian Christians. In the Indian subcontinent, Christians who speak Hindi-Urdu translate the word "God" as Khuda (ख़ुदा/خدا), though his personal name is rendered as "Yahovah" (यहोवा/یہوّاہ) or "Yahvah" (यहवा/یہواہ). Bible translations into Hindi and Urdu use these terms.

== See also ==
- Names of God
- The Lord
