= Servas =

Servas may refer to:

- Servas International, also called Servas Open Doors, a global non-profit organization which allows travelers to be hosted by families and individuals in many countries of the world
- Servas, Ain, a commune of the Ain département in France
- Servas, Gard, a commune of the Gard département in France

== See also ==
- Servus (disambiguation)
