= Parting tradition =

Farewell customs

Parting traditions or parting customs are various traditions, customs, and habits used by people to acknowledge the parting of individuals or groups of people from each other.

In Klezmer music tradition, parting melodies are played at a Jewish wedding day, such as the Zay gezunt (be healthy), Gas-nign, Dobriden (good day), Dobranotsh or A gute nakht (good night) etc. These types of pieces were sometimes in 3/4 which may have given an air of dignity and seriousness.

== See also ==
- Greeting
- Salutation
- Parting phrase
