= Good trip =

Good trip may refer to:

- A valediction
- A highly pleasurable psychedelic experience
