= Block letters (disambiguation) =

Block letters are a form of handwriting. It can also refer to:

- A style of business letter format.
- The letters at the start and finish of the serial number on a piece of U.S. currency, most commonly Federal Reserve Notes. Originally these letters were not actually letters, but rather a collection of elaborate symbols.
- A typeface or hand lettering having discrete sans-serif glyphs.
- The Hebrew alphabet, called block script.
