= Servus (disambiguation) =

Servus is a salutation in Central and Eastern Europe.

Servus may also refer to:

- Servus Credit Union, a Canadian financial institution
- ServusTV, an Austrian TV channel
- Servus, Latin for slave; see Slavery in ancient Rome
- servus.at, a community-based network initiative from Linz, Austria.
