= Hand-kissing =

Form of respectful gesture

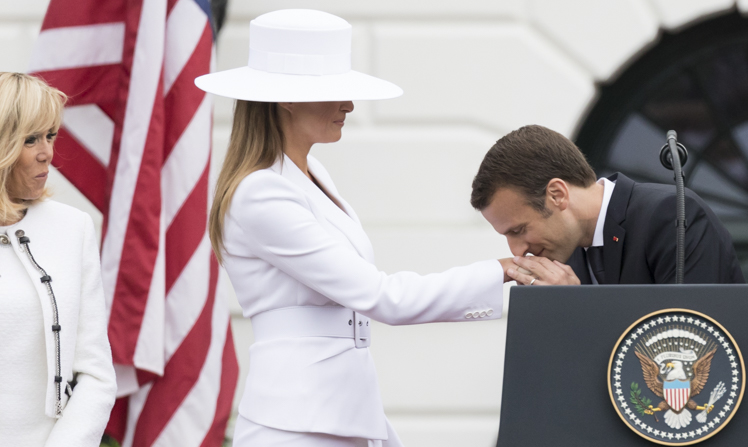
French President Emmanuel Macron greets U.S. First Lady Melania Trump by kissing her hand (24 April 2018).

Hand-kissing is a greeting gesture that indicates courtesy, politeness, respect, admiration, affection or even devotion by one person toward another. A hand-kiss is considered a respectful way for a gentleman to greet a lady. Today, non-ritual hand-kissing is rare and takes place mostly within conservative class or diplomatic contexts. Today, the hand kiss has largely been replaced by a kiss on the cheek or a handshake.

A non-ritual hand-kiss can be initiated by the lady, who would hold out her right hand with the back of the hand facing upward; or by the gentleman extending his right hand with the palm facing upward to invite the lady to put her right hand lightly on it facing downward. The gentleman may bow towards the offered hand and—often symbolically—would touch her knuckles with his lips, while lightly holding the offered hand. However, the lips do not actually touch the hand in modern tradition, especially in a formal environment where any intimate or romantic undertones could be considered inappropriate. The gesture is short, lasting less than a second.

== Around the world ==
In the Arab world, Ethiopia, Turkey, Malaysia, Indonesia, and Brunei, hand-kissing is a common way to greet elder people of all genders, primarily the closest relatives (both parents, grandparents, and uncles or aunts) and teachers. Occasionally, after kissing the hand, the greeter will draw the hand to his own forehead. In the Philippines, the gesture evolved into just touching the hand to the forehead; hand-kissing itself has become a separate kind of gesture that has merged with the European custom concerning when it may be used.

In Southern Italy, especially Sicily, the verbal greeting "I kiss the hands." (Italian: "Bacio le mani.") derives from this usage. Similarly, in Hungary the verbal greeting "I kiss your hand." (Hungarian: "Kezét csókolom.") is sometimes used, especially when greeting elders and in rural communities. The shortened version "I kiss it." (Hungarian: "Csókolom.") is more wide spread. A similar expression exists also in Poland (Polish: "Całuję rączki", meaning "I kiss [your] little hands"), although nowadays it's considered obsolete.

In Romania the gesture is reserved for priests and women and it is common greeting when first introduced to a woman in parts of the country. The verbal expression towards women is "I kiss your hand" (Romanian: "sărut mâna" and sometimes shortened to "săru-mâna") Towards priests it is sometimes changed into "I kiss your right" due to the belief that the right hand of the priest is holy and blessed regardless of the priest himself and any eventual shortcomings. In the past both parents used to get their hand kissed and seen as a type of blessing, however the expression is now almost exclusively towards women.

== Chivalrous gesture ==
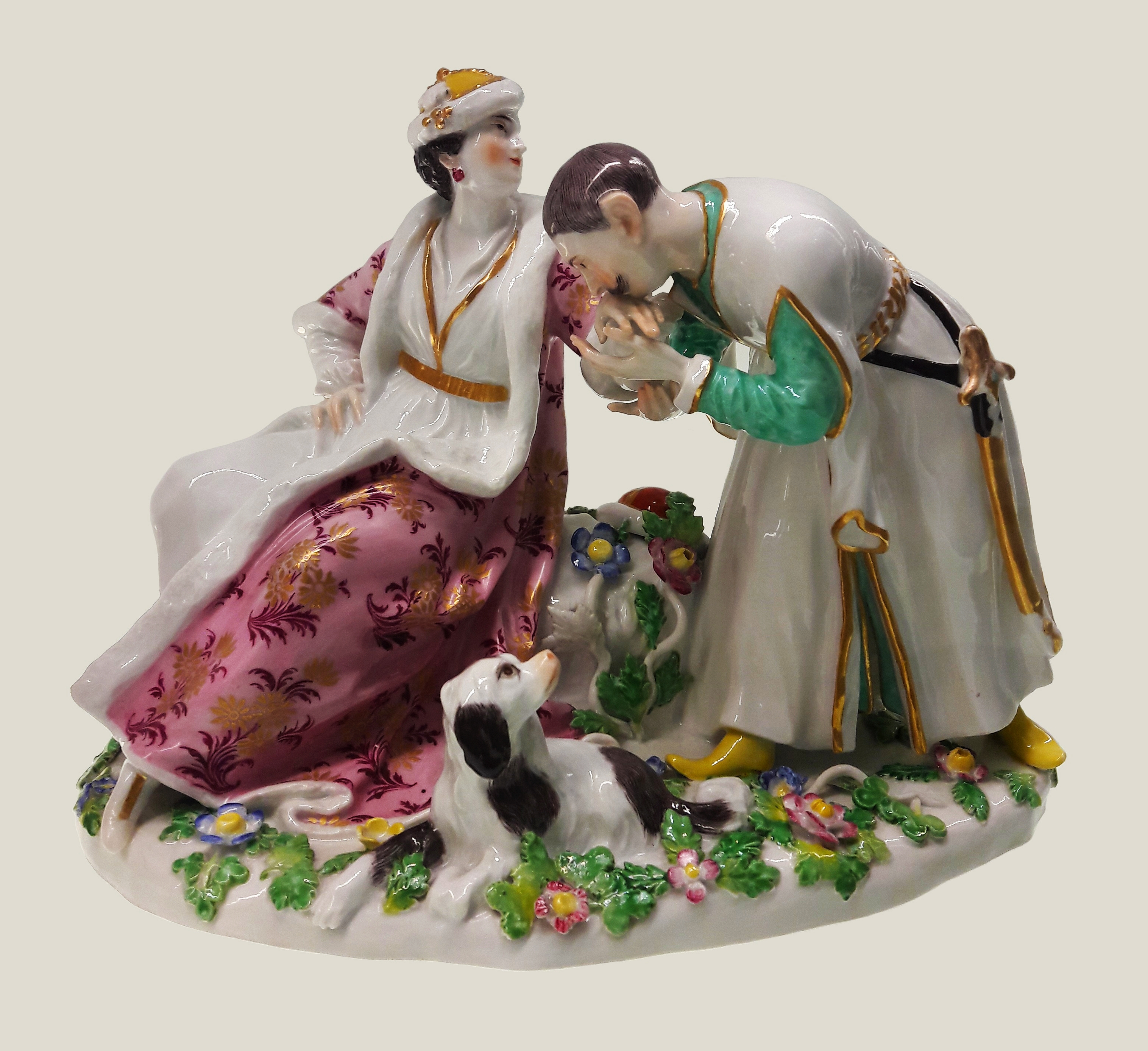
Polish hand kiss by Johann Joachim Kändler (1740s, National Museum, Warsaw)

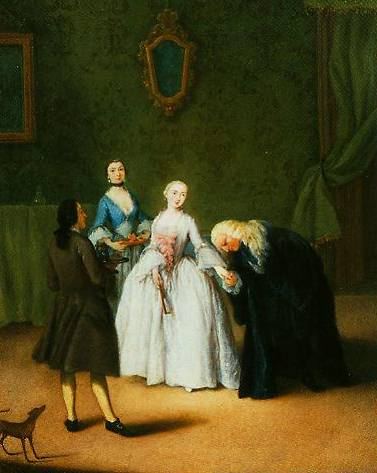
A nobleman kissing a lady's hand, by Pietro Longhi (1746)

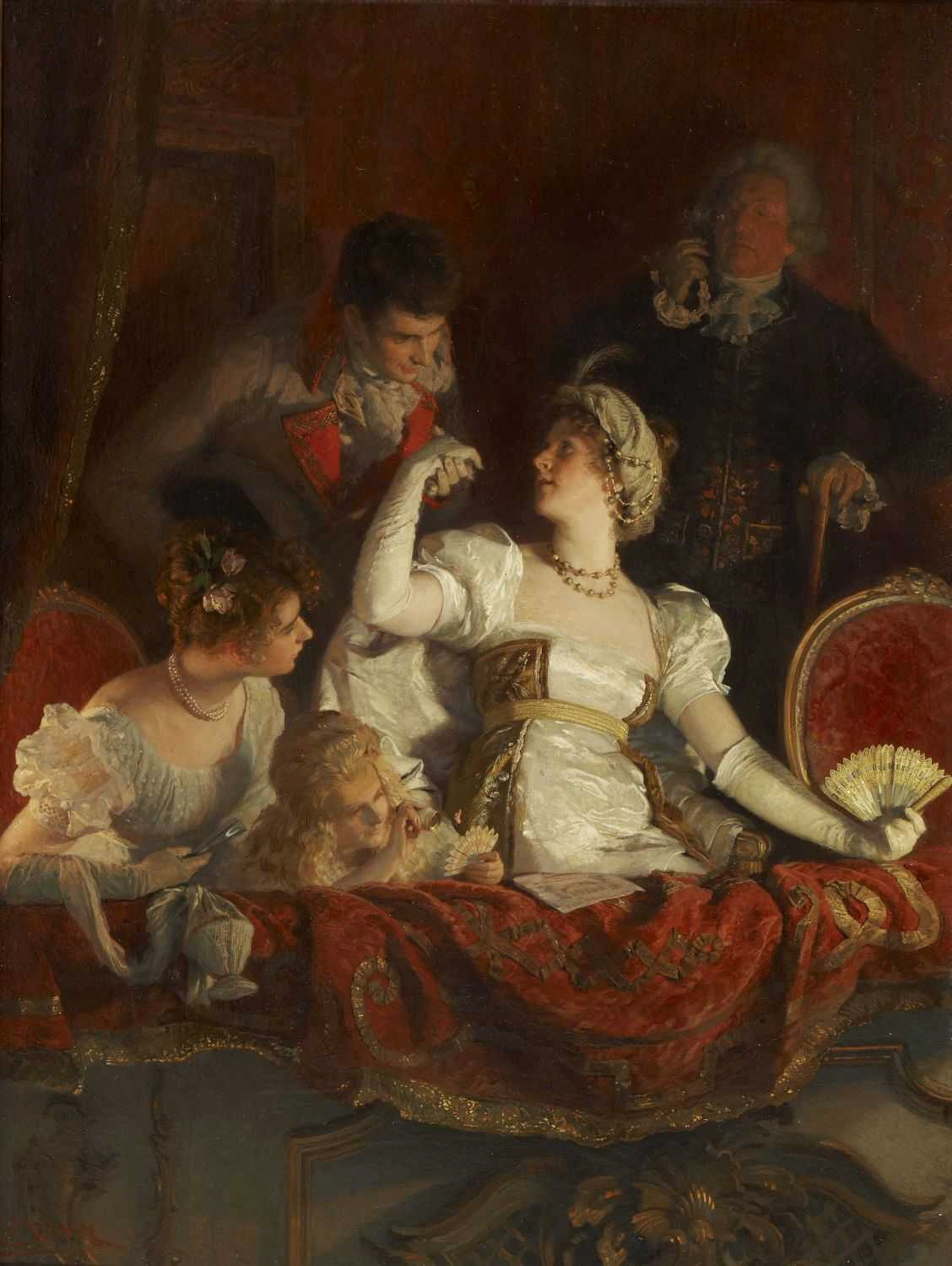
In the theatre (19th/20th century)

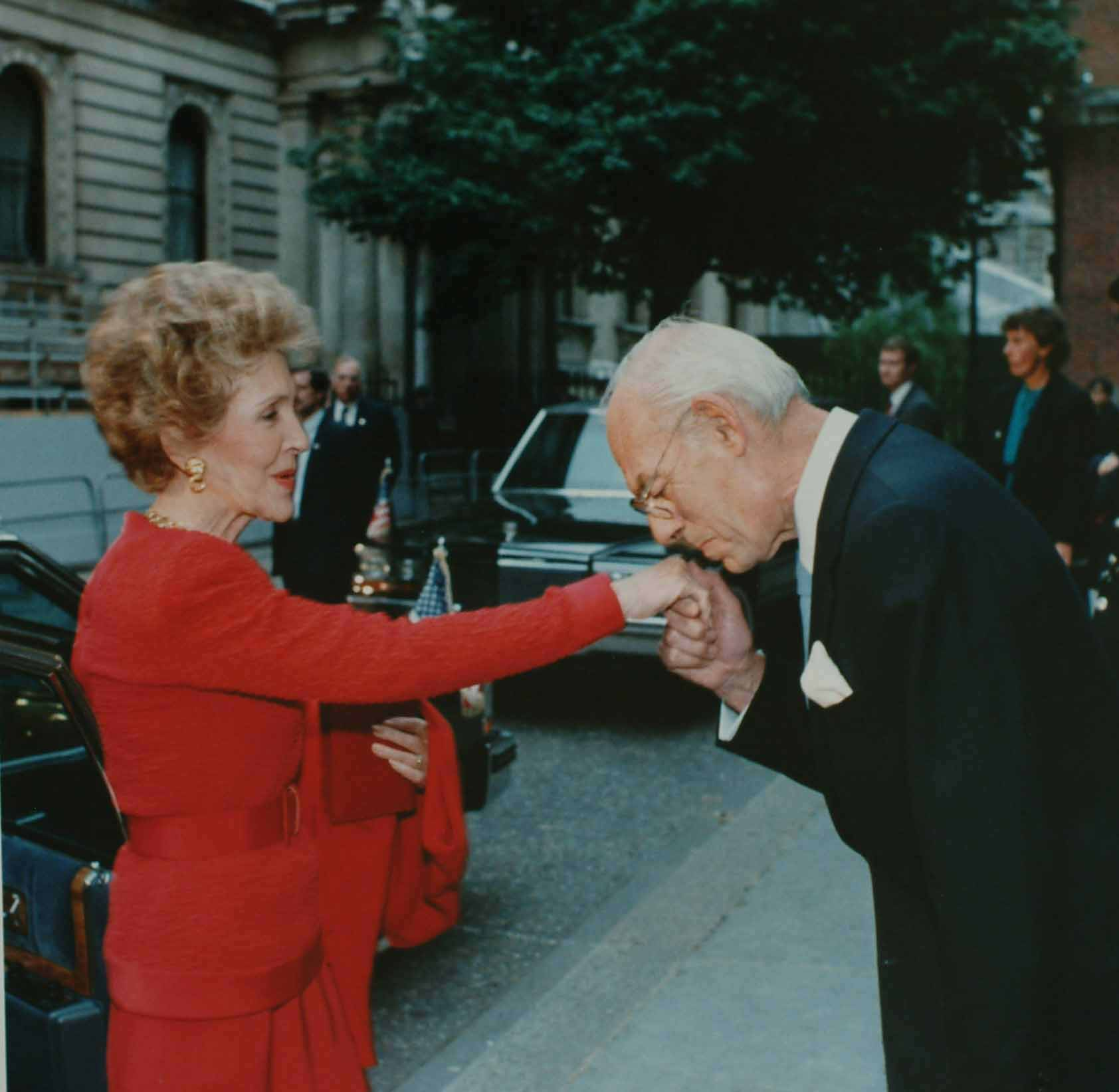
Denis Thatcher greets U.S. First Lady Nancy Reagan by kissing her hand (1988)

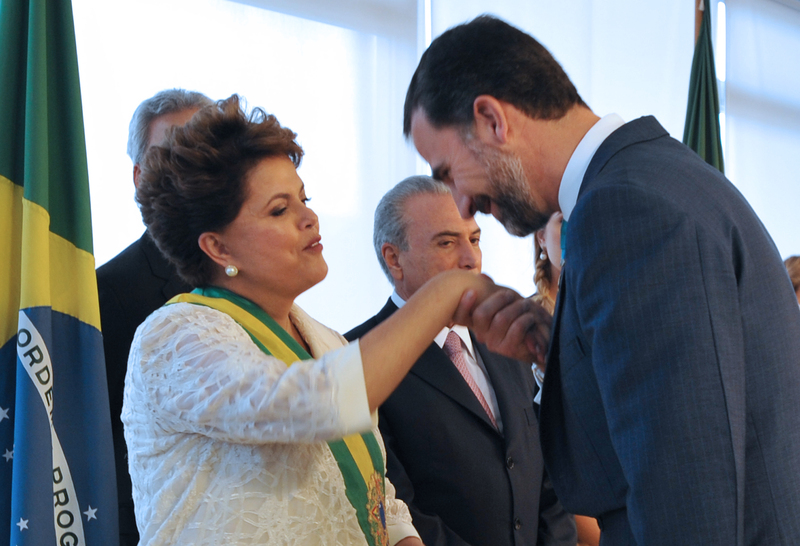
Brazilian President Dilma Rousseff and Felipe, Prince of Asturias, during her inaugural ceremony (1 January 2011)

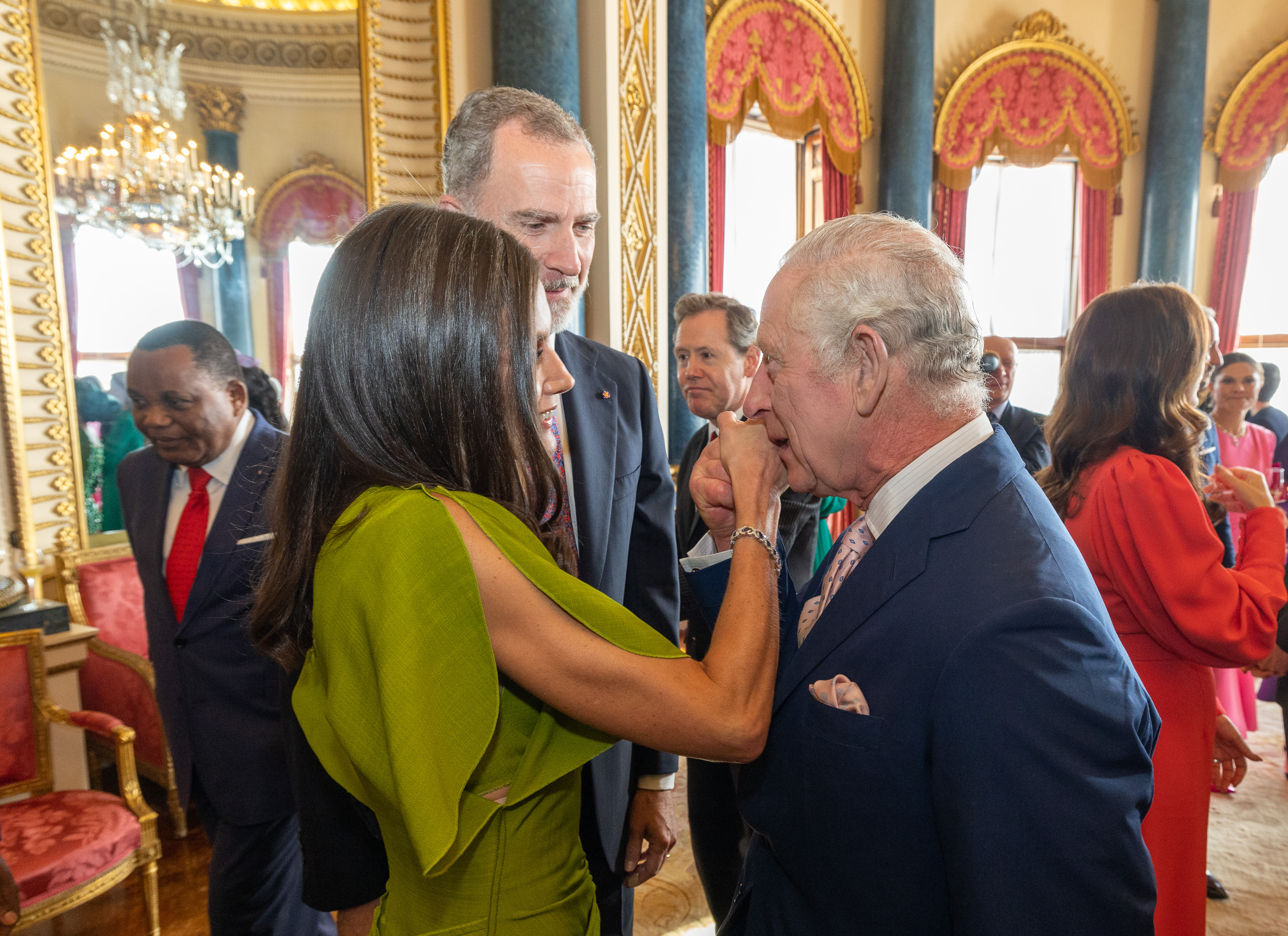
King Charles III kissing Queen Letizia of Spain's hand at a reception on the eve of his coronation (5 May 2023)

A hand-kiss was considered a respectful way for a gentleman to greet a lady. The practice originated in the Polish–Lithuanian Commonwealth and the Spanish courts of the 17th and 18th centuries. The gesture is still at times observed in Central Europe, namely in Poland, Austria and Hungary, among others.

Traditionally, the hand-kiss was initiated by a woman, who offered her hand to a man to kiss. The lady offering her hand was expected to be of the same or higher social status than the man. It was a gesture of courtesy and extreme politeness, and it was considered impolite and even rude to refuse an offered hand. Today, the practice is very uncommon in many European countries, and has been largely replaced by a kiss on the cheek or a handshake.

== Kissing the ring ==
Kissing the hand, or particularly a ring on the hand was also a gesture of formal submission or pledge of allegiance of man to man, or as a diplomatic gesture. The gesture would indicate submission by kissing the signet ring (a form of seal worn as a jewelry ring), the person's symbol of authority. The gesture was common in the European upper class throughout the 18th and 19th centuries. It started to disappear in the 20th century, to be replaced by the egalitarian handshake. However, former French president Jacques Chirac made hand-kissing his trademark and the gesture is still encountered in diplomatic situations.

== Religious usage ==
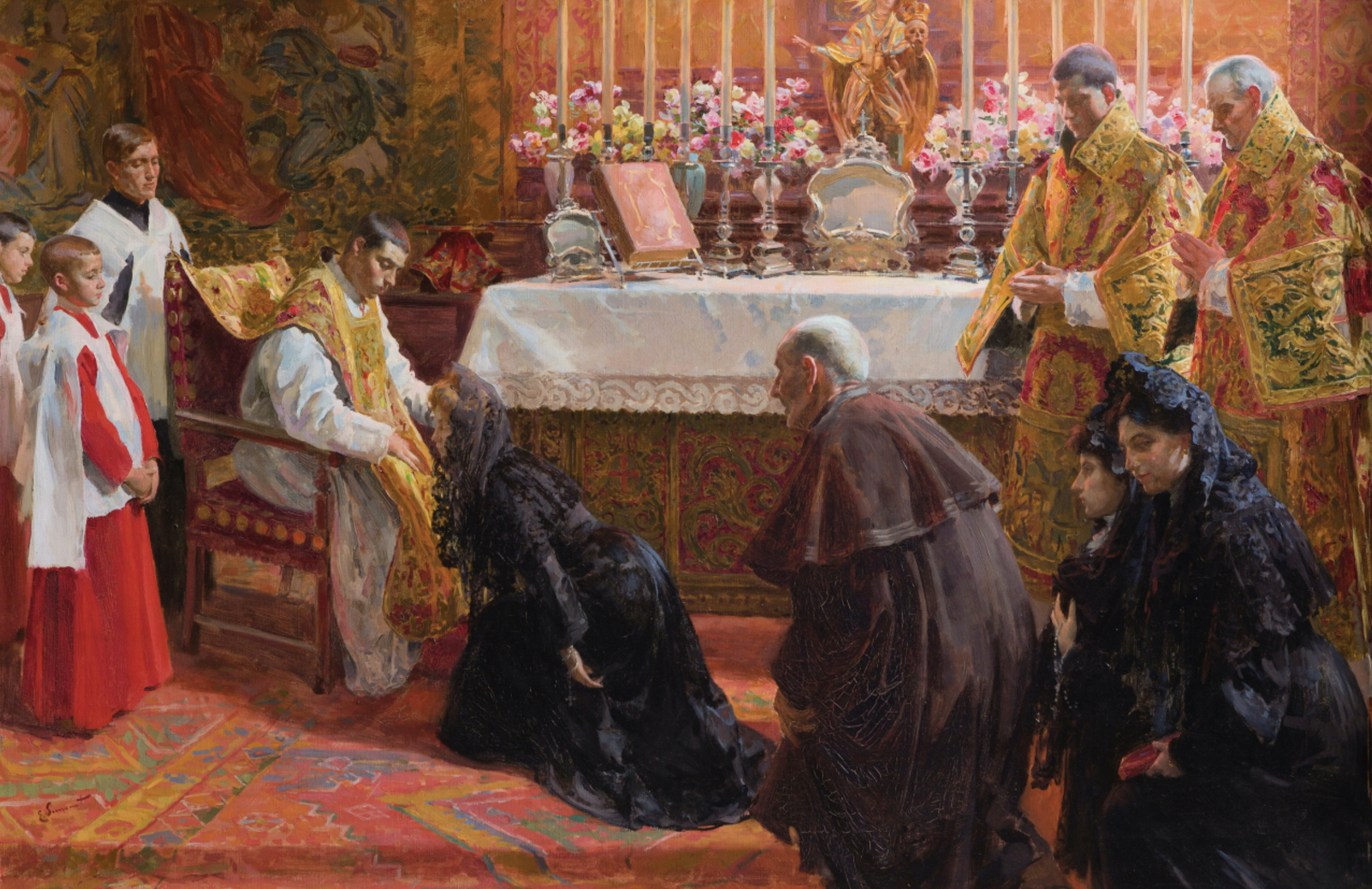
The first Mass (1907) by Enrique Simonet.

In the Catholic Church, a Catholic meeting the Pope or a Cardinal, or even a lower-ranking prelate, will kiss the ring on his hand. This has become uncommon in circles not used to formal protocol, even often dispensed with amongst clergy. Sometimes, the devout Catholic combines the hand kissing with kneeling on the left knee as an even stronger expression of filial respect for the clerically high-ranking father. The cleric may then in a fatherly way lay his other hand on the kisser's head or even bless him/her by a manual cross sign. In the Catholic Church, it is also traditional for the laity to kiss the hands of a newly-ordained priest after his inaugural mass, in veneration of the Body of Christ, which is held in the priest's hands during the Holy Eucharist. In May 2014, Pope Francis kissed the hands of six Holocaust survivors to honour the six million Jews killed in the Holocaust.

In the Eastern Orthodox Church, and Oriental Orthodox Churches, it is appropriate and common for laity to greet clergy, whether priests or bishops, by making a profound bow and saying, "Father, bless" (to a priest) or "Master, bless" (to a bishop) while placing their right hand, palm up, in front of their bodies. The priest then blesses them with the sign of the cross and then places his hand in theirs, offering the opportunity to kiss his hand. Orthodox Christians kiss their priest's hands not only to honor their spiritual father confessor, but in veneration of the Body of Christ which the priest handles during the Divine Liturgy as he prepares Holy Communion. It is also a common practice when writing a letter to a priest to begin with the words "Father Bless" rather than "Dear Father" and end the letter with the words "Kissing your right hand" rather than "Sincerely."

During liturgical services, altar servers and lower clergy will kiss the hand of a priest when handing him something in the course of their duties, such as a censer, when he receives it in his right hand, and a bishop when he receives it in either hand since a bishop bestows blessings with both hands.

There are records of hand-kissing in the Islamic Caliphate as early as the 7th century. Hand-kissing known as Taqbil, as a respect for nobility, is practiced by the Hadharem of Yemen.

== In popular culture ==
The hand-kiss is used quite prominently in The Godfather series, as a way to reverence the Dons. It also features in period films, such as Dangerous Liaisons.

== See also ==
- Greeting
- Salute
- Kissing hands
- Mano (gesture)
