= Ciao =

Salutation of Italian origin

Ciao (/tʃaʊ/ CHOW, Italian: [ˈtʃaːo]) is an informal salutation in the Italian language that is used for both "hello" and "goodbye".

Originally from the Venetian language, it has entered the vocabulary of English and of many other languages around the world. Its dual meaning of "hello" and "goodbye" makes it similar to salām in Arabic, annyeong in Korean, aloha in Hawaiian, dorud (bedrud) in Persian, and chào in Vietnamese (the last is a false cognate; the two words are not linguistically related despite sounding similar to each other).

== Etymology ==
The word derives from the Venetian phrase s-ciào vostro or s-ciào su, literally meaning "(I am) your slave". This greeting is analogous to the medieval Latin servus which is still used colloquially in parts of Central/Eastern Europe, or the antiquated English valediction Your Obedient Servant. The expression was not a literal statement of fact, but rather a perfunctory promise of good will among friends (along the lines of "at your service" in English). The Venetian word for "slave", s-ciào [ˈstʃao] or s-ciàvo, derives from Medieval Latin sclavus, a loanword from Medieval Greek Σκλάβος, related to the ethnic "Slavic", since most of the slaves at that time came from the Balkans.

This greeting was eventually shortened to ciào, lost all its servile connotations and came to be used as an informal salutation by speakers of all classes. In modern Italian language, the word is used (in addition to the meaning of salutation) as an exclamation of resignation (also in a positive sense), as in Oh, va be', ciao! ("Oh, well, never mind!"). A Milanese tongue-twister says Se gh'hinn gh'hinn; se gh'hinn nò, s'ciào ("If there is [money], there is; if there isn't, farewell! [there's nothing we can do]").

== Spread ==
The Venetian ciào was adopted by Northern Italian people during the late 19th and early 20th century. Later it became common elsewhere in Italy with the spelling ciao. It has since spread to many countries in Europe, along with other items of the Italian culture. In the late 19th and early 20th centuries, the greeting (spelled chau and only meaning 'bye') spread to the Americas—especially Colombia, Costa Rica, Uruguay, Paraguay, Bolivia, Peru, Ecuador, Chile, Brazil (as tchau), Venezuela, Panama and Argentina – largely by way of Italian immigrants. In today's Cuba, ciao as a closing in letters has largely replaced the more traditional adiós, with its religious implications, for many young people. Ciao has also permeated Australian culture, becoming a popular greeting among descendants of Italian immigrants. It is also common in some varieties of South African English. Ciao has also been used in some parts of Romania as a way to say 'goodbye'. Serbo-Croatian-speaking countries use ciao (ćao, Serbo-Croatian Cyrillic: ћао) as both a greeting and a parting interjection. It is used in the same sense in Slovenia and written as čao/čav.

Ernest Hemingway's novel A Farewell to Arms (1929), which is set in northeast Italy during World War I, is credited with bringing the word into the English language.

== Usage as greeting ==
In contemporary Italian usage, ciao is interchangeable for both an informal hello and goodbye, much like aloha in Hawaiian, salām in Arabic, shalom in Hebrew and annyeong in Korean. In Italy, ciao is mainly used in informal contexts, i.e. among family members, relatives, and friends, in other words, with those one would address with the familiar tu (second person singular) as opposed to Lei (courtesy form); in these contexts, ciao can be the norm even as a morning or evening salutation, in lieu of buon giorno or buona sera, deemed too formal among friends, relatives, or the very familiar.

In other languages, ciao has come to have more specific meanings. The following list summarizes the spelling and uses of salutations derived from ciao in various languages and countries.

- Albanian: çao ("goodbye")
- Amharic: ቻው, chaw ("goodbye")
- Bulgarian: чао, chao ("goodbye")
- Catalan: ciao, txao ("goodbye")
- Czech: ciao, čau, also čauky, čauves, čauky mňauky ("hello" or "goodbye") and čau čau (goodbye)
- Dutch: ciao ("goodbye")
- English: ciao ("goodbye")
- Estonian: "tšau", also "tšauki" - sometimes pronounced with "s" ("hello" or "goodbye")
- French: ciao, tchao, tchô (mostly used to say "goodbye"). "Tchao" is slang in French. In 1983, this word was used in the title of the popular movie Tchao, pantin (So Long, Stooge). The variant tchô was popularised by the comic book Titeuf Tchô, monde cruel.
- German: ciao, tschau ("goodbye", in Switzerland also "hello")
- Greek: τσάο, tsao ("goodbye")
- Hebrew: צ'או chao ("goodbye")
- Hungarian: csáó or the more informal csá or cső ("hello" or "goodbye")
- Italian: ciao ("hello", "hi" or "goodbye") also "ciao ciao" (bye bye).
- Japanese: チャオ, chao ("hello" or "hi") also チャオチャオ chao chao (bye bye).
- Latvian: čau ("hello" or "goodbye")
- Lithuanian: čiau ("goodbye", rarely "hello")
- Macedonian: чао, čao ("goodbye")
- Malay: چاو دولو, cau dulu ("goodbye"); used informally in Malaysia by the leaving party. The word "cau" can be used informally as a verb which means "leave"
- Maltese: ċaw ("goodbye"); also ċaw ċaw ("bye bye")
- Neapolitan: cià ("hello", "hi" or "goodbye")
- Polish: ciao [ˈt͡ɕa.ɔ] (rare)
- Portuguese: tchau ("goodbye"), tchau tchau ("bye bye"), or tchauzinho ("little bye"); in Portugal xau is also used, without the "t" sound, especially in written informal language such as SMS or web chats
- Romanian: ciao ("hello" or "goodbye"); it is often written as ceau although this form is not officially in the Romanian vocabulary
- Russian: чау, чао, chao; ("goodbye"); also jokingly - чао-какао, chao-kakao (from чай — "tea" and какао — "cocoa")
- Bosnian/Croatian/Serbian: ćao / ћао (informal "hi" or "bye")
- Sicilian: ciau ("hello", "hi")
- Slovak: čau (variations: čauko, čaves, čauky, čaf); mostly as "goodbye", but stands in for "hello" primarily in informal written communication (text messages, emails) and phone calls because it is more character-efficient/shorter and more hip than the Slovak "ahoj"
- Slovene: ciao, čau or čaw ("hello" or "goodbye"); also čaw čaw ("bye bye")
- Somali: ciao ("goodbye")
- Spanish: in Argentina, Paraguay and Uruguay the word chau is the most common expression for "goodbye". In Chile, chao is the standard farewell. In Spain, where "adios" (with a religious etymology as "goodbye", the same as Italian "addio" and French "adieu", meaning "to God" in English) is the common expression, people can use chao as an original way of saying goodbye.
- Swiss-German: ciao/Tschau ("hello" or "goodbye")
- Tigrinya: ቻው, chaw ("goodbye")
- Turkish: çav ("goodbye")
- Venetian: ciào ("hello" or "goodbye")

In some languages, such as Latvian, the vernacular version of ciao has become the most common form of informal salutation.

The Vietnamese chào ("hello" or "goodbye") is phonetically similar but not etymologically related.

=== Variations ===
The dominant use in Latin America uses the term solely as farewell rather than as a greeting.

The greeting has several variations and minor uses. In Italian and Portuguese, for example, a doubled ciao ciao/tchau tchau means specifically "goodbye", whilst the tripled or quadrupled word (but said with short breaks between each one) means "Bye, I'm in a hurry!"

Pronounced with a long [aː], it means "Hello, I'm so glad to meet you!" (be it sincere or sarcastic) in Italian, and a sarcastic or humorous use of "bye!" (cf. American English) in Portuguese. It can be used in Italian to express sarcasm at another person's point of view about one topic, especially when that opinion sounds outdated, in which case the meaning is comparable to the English "Yeah, right!"

In all these cases, however, the special meaning is conferred more by the vocal inflection than by the modified use.

== See also ==
- Hello
- Goodbye
- Parting phrase
