= Business letter =

Written form of communication among businesses and between businesses and individuals

A business letter is a letter from one company to another, or such organizations and their customers, clients, or other external parties. The overall style of letter depends on the relationship between the parties concerned. Business letters can have many types of content, for example to request direct information or action from another party, to order supplies from a supplier, to point out a mistake by the letter's recipient, to reply directly to a request, to apologize for a wrong, or to convey goodwill. A business letter is sometimes useful because it produces a permanent written record, and may be taken more seriously by the recipient than other forms of communication. It is written in formal language.

== General format ==
=== Margins ===
Typically, side, top and bottom margins are 25–32 millimetres (1–1 1/4 in) inches, and one-page letters and memos are vertically centered.

=== Font formatting ===
No special character or font formatting is used, except for the subject line, which is usually underlined.

=== Punctuation ===
The salutation or greeting is generally followed by a comma in British style, whereas in the United States a colon is used in formal contexts and a comma otherwise. The valediction or closing is followed by a comma.

=== Form ===
The following is the general format, excluding indentation used in various formats:

[SENDER'S COMPANY NAME]
[SENDER'S ADDRESS (optional if placed at bottom)]
[SENDER'S PHONE]
[SENDER'S E-MAIL (optional)]

[DATE]

[RECIPIENT W/O PREFIX]
[RECIPIENT'S COMPANY]
[RECIPIENT'S ADDRESS]

(Optional) Attention [DEPARTMENT/PERSON]

Dear [RECIPIENT W/ PREFIX]
[First Salutation then Subject in Business letters]

[CONTENT]

[CONTENT]

[COMPLIMENTARY CLOSING (Sincerely, Respectfully, Regards, etc.)]

[SENDER]
[SENDER'S TITLE (optional)]
[SENDER'S ADDRESS (optional if placed at top)]

Enclosures ([NUMBER OF ENCLOSURES])

== Indentation formats ==
Business letters conform to generally one of six indentation formats: standard, open, block, semi-block, modified block, and modified semi-block. Put simply, "semi-" means that the first lines of paragraphs are indented; "modified" means that the sender's address, date, and closing are significantly indented.

=== Open ===
The open-format letter does not use punctuation after the salutation and no punctuation after the complimentary closing.

=== Block ===
In a block-format letter, all text is left aligned and paragraphs are not indented.

=== Modified block ===
In a modified-block format letter, all text is left aligned (except the author's address, date, and closing), paragraphs are not indented, and the author's address, date, and closing begin at the center point.

                                                       company name and address                                                                                              
       date                                                                                                                                                            
       TO

=== Semi-block ===
Semi-block format is similar to the Modified block format, except that the first line of each paragraph is indented.

=== Modified semi-block ===
In a modified semi-block format letter, all text is left aligned (except the author's address, date, and closing), paragraphs are indented, and the author's address, date, and closing are usually indented in the same position.
