= Fist-and-palm =

Body language used for etiquette

The fist-and-palm gesture, also known as gongshou (Chinese: 拱手; pinyin: Gǒngshǒu), or zuoyi (Chinese: 作揖; pinyin: Zuòyī) in Chinese, is a traditional Chinese ceremonial gesture or salute used for greeting or showing respect. It involves bringing together the index finger, middle finger, ring finger, and little finger of both hands, with the palms facing inward or downward and the thumbs of each hand interlocking. One hand is placed over the other, and generally, the left-hand covers the right one for men and is reversed for women. There are different variants depending on conditions, such as gender, occasion and relationship between the individuals. Additional hand and body movements such as bowing may be used with the gesture.

== History ==
The Gongshou gesture can be traced back to Zhou dynasty (1046 BC – 256 BC). Imperial court of the Zhou dynasty established ritual and music system, which includes the earliest form of "Zuoyi" gesture. The system emphasized obedience and respect within the society, which helped the dynasty to centralize power within its patriarchal clan.

== Gallery ==
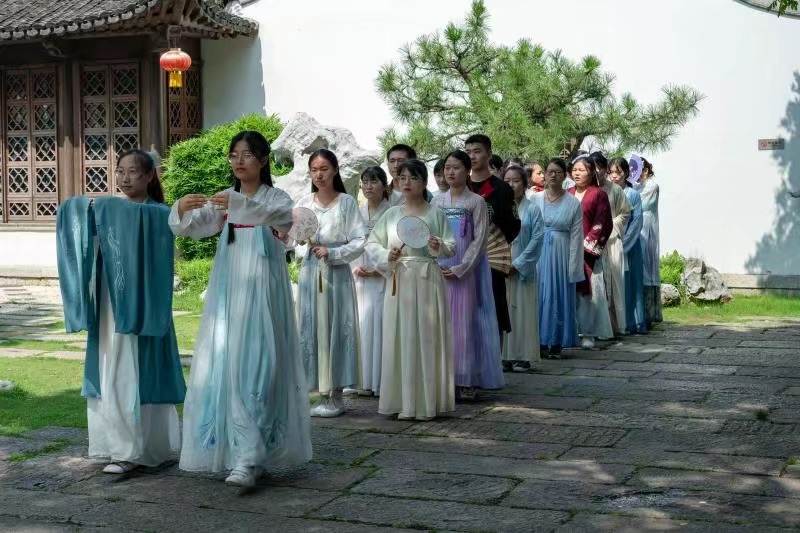
College students in China performing a variant of fist-and-palm gestures.

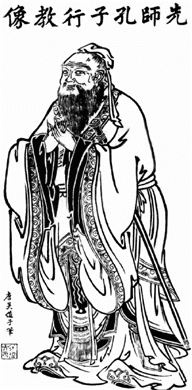
An illustration depicting Confucius with a variant of fist-and-palm gestures.

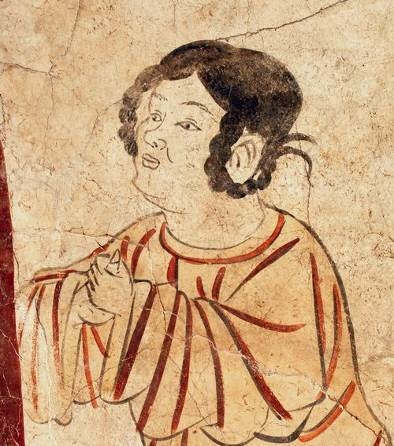
A Tang dynasty mural depicting fist-and-palm gestures.

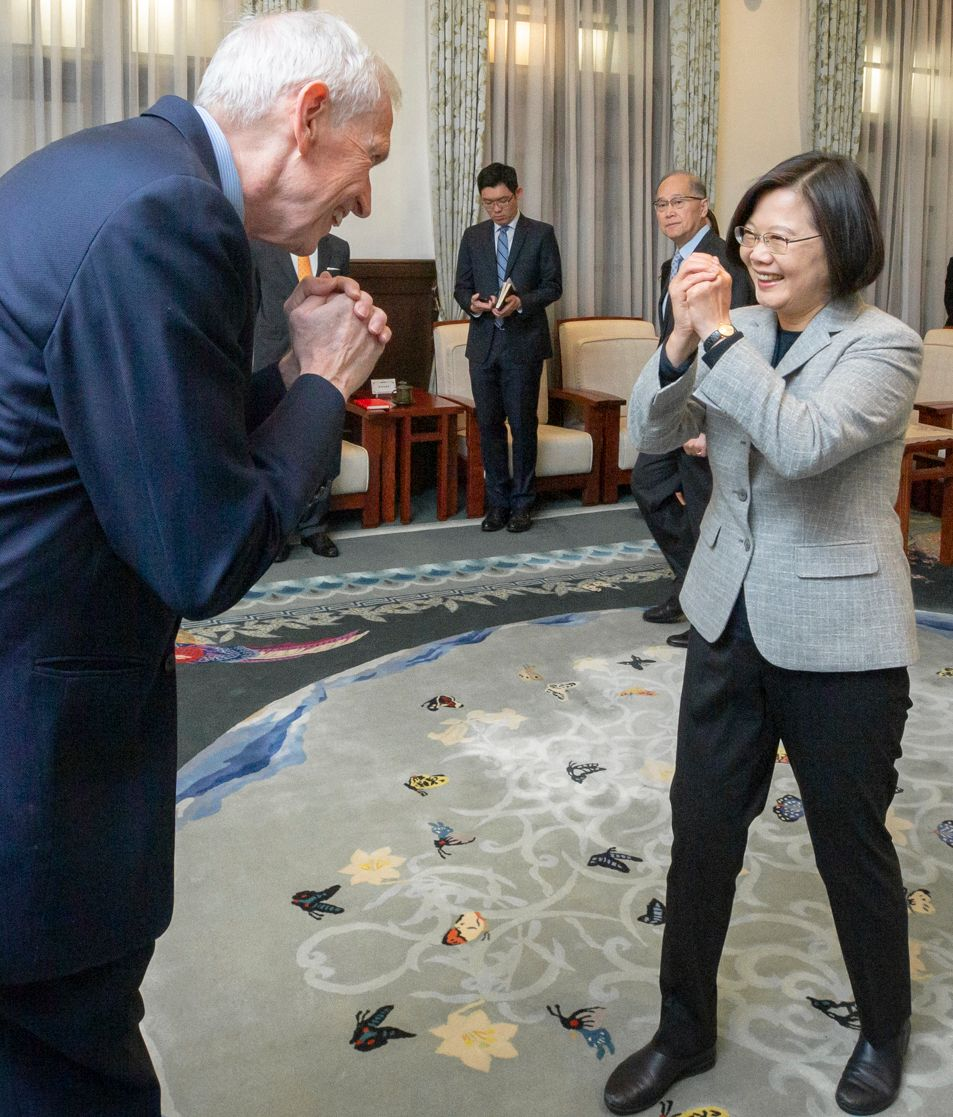
The fist-and-palm is used during the COVID-19 pandemic by government officials in Taiwan as an alternative to handshake.

== See also ==
- Bowing
- Handshake
- Kowtow
- Proskynesis
