= Tashi delek =

Tibetan-language expression

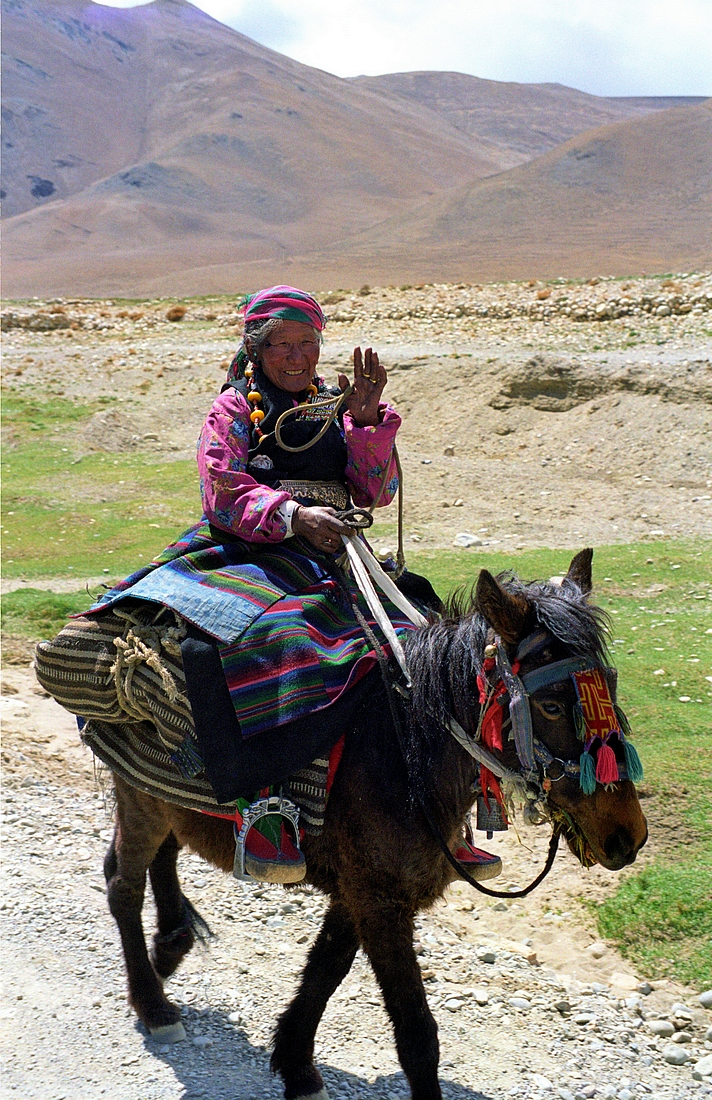
Tashi delek!

Tashi delek (Tibetan: བཀྲ་ཤིས་བདེ་ལེགས, Wylie: bkra shis bde legs, Tibetan pronunciation: [tʂáɕi tèle]) is a Tibetan expression used to greet, congratulate or wish someone good luck. It is also used in Bhutan and Northeast India in the same way. Tashi delek is associated with Losar, the Tibetan festival celebrating the lunisolar new year.

== Origin and meaning ==
Tashi (Tibetan: བཀྲ་ཤིས, Wylie: bkra shis, [tʂáɕi]) means 'auspicious' - the Tibetan translation of the Sanskrit svastika and delek (Tibetan: བདེ་ལེགས, Wylie: bde legs, [tèle], also rendered as deleg or deleh) means 'fine' or 'well'. It is difficult and perhaps impossible to translate properly into English. Different authors render it as 'Blessings and good luck' or 'May all auspicious signs come to this environment'.

== Usage by Tibetans ==
Tashi delek is traditionally used as part of a larger invocation on Losar. With the Dalai Lama's exile and creation of the Tibetan diaspora, exile authorities promoted the use of tashi delek as an all-purpose greeting which could be easily picked up by foreign sponsors. Students of the exile school system are taught that this usage of Tashi delek has roots in premodern Tibet, and that Chinese Tibetans' exclusive usage of Tashi delek for New Year's is corrupt. Tour operators have promoted the phrase, along with khata scarves and prayer flags, as essentialized and commodifiable aspects of Tibetan culture, a fact that has caused resentment among some religious Tibetans.

== Other uses ==
The phrase tashi delek is also used in Chinese with the Chinese transcription Zhaxi dele (扎西德勒). There is a song called Zhaxi Dele with lyrics by Rongzhong Erjia, a Tibetan, and music by Chang Yingzhong, a Han Chinese.

The phrase is also used in Bhutan, Sikkim, and Nepal. "Tashi Delek" is the name of a website that provides information on the nation of Bhutan and promotes tourism. There is a company in Bhutan called TashiDelek.com and a Hotel Tashi Delek in Gangtok, Sikkim. The inflight magazine of the Bhutanese airline Druk Air is called Tashi Delek.
