= ServusTV =

Austrian TV station

Servus TV
- Country: Austria
- Transmitters: Untersberg
- Headquarters: Wals-Siezenheim

Programming
- Language: German
- Picture format: 576i (16:9 SDTV); 1080i (16:9 HDTV)

Ownership
- Owner: Red Bull GmbH
- Key people: Ferdinand Wegscheider; Dietrich Mateschitz (until 2022); Dietmar Otti; Christopher Reindl

History
- Launched: 17 September 1995; 31 years ago
- Former names: Salzburg TV (1995–2009)

Links
- Website: www.servustv.com

Servus TV is a TV station based in Wals-Siezenheim in the Austrian state of Salzburg and owned by Red Bull Media House GmbH, a subsidiary of Red Bull GmbH, which also publishes the magazine Servus in Stadt und Land. The station is the successor to Salzburg TV, founded in 1995 and rebranded in 2009. It is politically aligned with the far right.

In Austria Servus TV is distributed via DVB-T2 terrestrial television, the Astra 19.2°E satellites, as well as via digital cable provider A1 Kabel TV and some German digital cable networks.

== History ==
The history of the station dates back to the first private TV station in Austria. Started as Salzburg TV in 1995, it was initially available only by cable in Salzburg. The TV station received media attention after it started terrestrial transmission on 25 October 2000, which was illegal at that time in Austria. The transmission facility, located at Untersberg (owned by Germany, but physically located in Austria), was confiscated by Austrian authorities after five days. The owner of Salzburg TV entered a hunger strike for two weeks in protest. As a result, terrestrial transmission of private TV stations was legalized in Austria, and transmission restarted in 2002 from the old transmission site on UHF channel 36.

The TV station was sold in 2004 due to impending bankruptcy. In 2007, the shares went to Red Bull GmbH. The original owners sold their shares of the station soon after, and in 2009, the station was renamed Servus TV. Its new name derives from a popular greeting used across the former lands of the Habsburg Empire in Central and Eastern Europe.

On May 3, 2016, Red Bull Media House announced that it would cease broadcasting to prevent the establishment of a work council at the company. The Red Bull owner Dietrich Mateschitz claimed that a works council would detract from the station's independence, and that the idea was brought forward "anonymously, supported by the union and the Chamber of Labor". On May 4, most employees expressed their opposition to the works council in writing and a video message was sent to Mateschitz asking him to continue the channel. On May 5, Mateschitz reversed his decision.

== Political direction ==
The TV station has been associated with the political far right and conspiracy theorising. As part of the talk show “Talk im Hangar 7”, the leading figure of the neo-fascist identitarian movement IBÖ Martin Sellner was invited to a panel discussion on the topic "How dangerous are our Muslims?".

In his weekly commentary series “Der Wegscheider”, the director of Servus TV Ferdinand Wegscheider spread controversial and unsubstantiated information about the COVID-19 pandemic. This frequently took the form of posing rhetorical questions. For example, he explained that the vaccination was “insufficiently tested” and contained “genetically modified substances”. He further claimed that the administration of the antiparasitic ivermectin would be an adequate therapy. In 2021, the press club Concordia filed an official complaint against the broadcaster at the communications authority of Austria (Kommunikationsbehörde Austria).

A recurring guest of Servus TV was the microbiologist and corona trivializer Sucharit Bhakdi.

== Availability ==
Servus TV is available via terrestrial transmission in Austria, as well as Europe-wide from the Astra 19.2°E satellite constellation. It is also available from the Swiss service Kabelio from the Hot Bird 13 satellites.

== Sports ==
Servus TV airs ice hockey on Sunday nights, with the Austrian Hockey League in Austria and the Deutsche Eishockey Liga in Germany. It also airs the FIM MotoGP World Championship, and will add the UEFA Champions League and Formula 1 in 2021. It previously aired the World Rally Championship, Red Bull Air Race and Red Bull X-Fighters.
