= Servus =

Salutation

Servus, and various local variants thereof, is a salutation used in many parts of Central and Eastern Europe, derived from Latin for 'slave, servant'. It is a word of greeting or parting like the Italian ciao (which also comes from the 'slave' meaning through Venetian s'ciao).

The salutation is spelled servus in German, Bavarian, Slovak, Romanian and Czech. In Rusyn and Ukrainian it is spelled сервус, in the Cyrillic alphabet. In Slovenian and Croatian the variant spelling serbus is also used. The greeting is spelled szervusz (sometimes spelled szerbusz) in Hungarian and serwus in Polish.

The use of servus in German is regional, largely to South Germany, Austria, and South Tirol. In the last two in Bavarian it is also spelled servas.

== Etymology ==
These words originate from servus, the Latin word for 'servant' or 'slave' also the origin of English serf. The phrase is an ellipsis of a Latin expression servus humillimus, domine spectabilis, meaning "[your] most humble servant, [my] noble lord". Nevertheless, no trace of subservience is implied in its modern use, which has only the cliché force of "at your service".

== Usage ==
Use of this expression is roughly coincident with the boundaries of the former Austro-Hungarian Empire. It is especially popular in Austria, Hungary, Slovakia, Romania (mostly in Transylvania), as well as in southern parts of Germany (Bavaria, Baden-Württemberg, Palatinate, middle and southern Hesse), northern Croatia, eastern Slovenia (mostly in Slovenian Styria), and western Ukraine. It may be rarely used in the Czech Republic and Poland (where it is considered an archaism, not used in common speech). The word may be used as a greeting, a parting salutation, or as both, depending on the region and context.

Despite its formal origins, servus is now used as an informal greeting in Bavaria, Baden-Württemberg, Austria, Südtirol, Slovenia, Hungary, and Romania. In Hungarian, several shortened versions of szervusz remain popular, like szevasz, szeva, szia, and szió.

== See also ==
- Ciao, an Italian greeting of similar origin
- Tjenare, a Swedish greeting of similar origin
- Moin
- Aloha
