= Mano (gesture) =

Filipino gesture of respect

A young kid pays respect to his grandfather by doing the mano gesture

Mano (Tagalog: pagmamano) is an honoring gesture performed in Filipino culture as a sign of respect and as a way of requesting a blessing from elders. Similar to hand-kissing, the person giving the greeting asks for permission to initiate the gesture by saying "Mano po" or "[Pa-]bless po". They then bow towards the elder and touch their forehead to the back of the elder's hand. The person receiving the greeting usually offers their right hand and replies with a blessing, typically "God bless you".

The word mano is Spanish for "hand", while the word po is a Filipino honorific appended to sentences to convey respect (usually when addressing elders). Put together, mano po literally translates to "[your] hand, please".

The gesture is a form of greeting typically done for relatives that are older by at least one generation (grandparents, parents, aunts, and uncles; but not older siblings or cousins). It is also commonly done for godparents, friends of older relatives, older relatives of friends or partners, and priests and ministers (traditionally at the end of mass). It can also be done for unrelated elderly acquaintances or strangers, especially when visiting their homes.

The gesture is also known as amin among Visayans, and siklod among Kapampangans. In Philippine English, it is also generically referred to as "bless". An identical tradition is followed in neighbouring Indonesia and Malaysia called salim and salam, respectively. This indicates that the custom dates back to pre-colonial times and is a shared tradition among cultures in Island Southeast Asia.

== Historical accounts ==
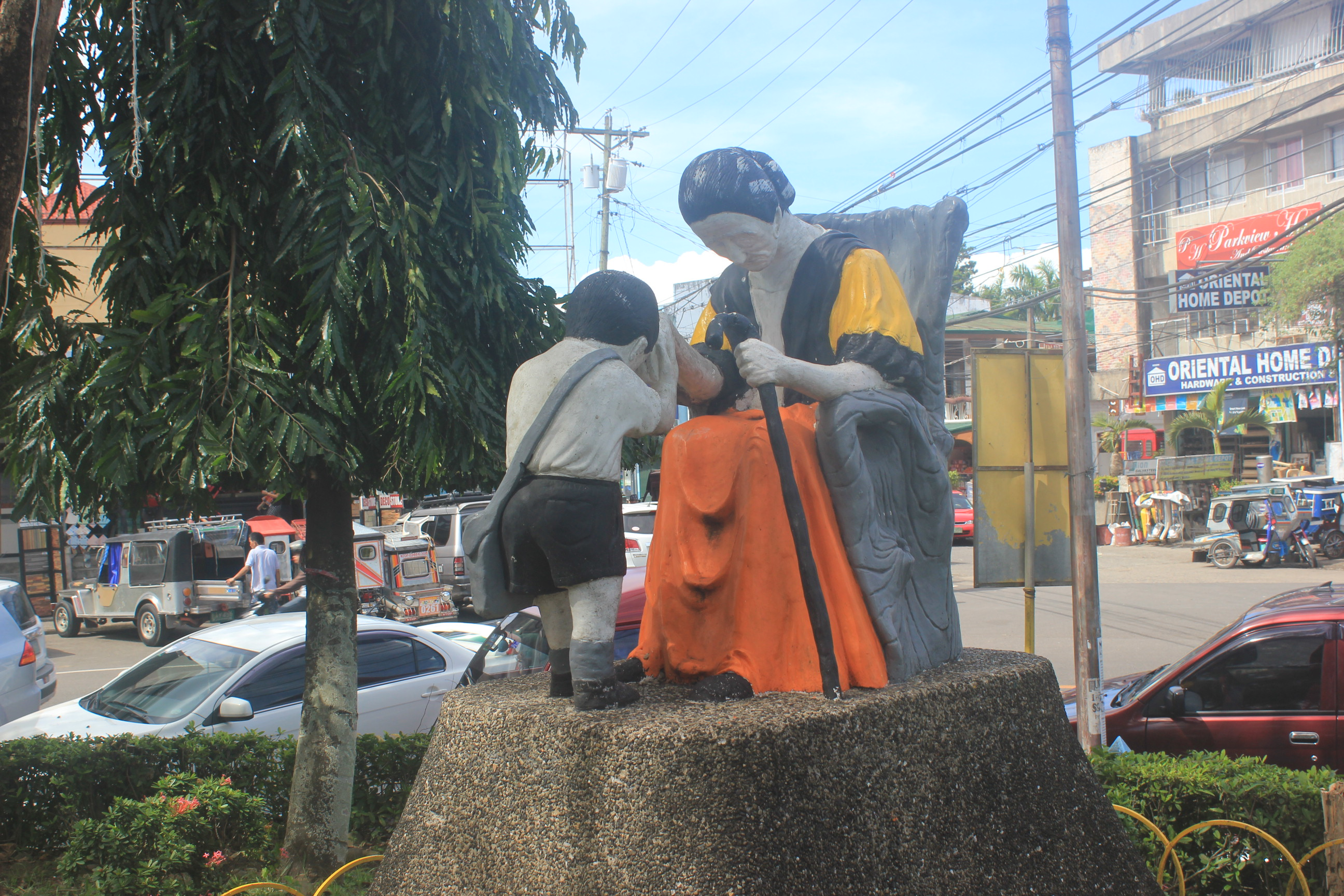
A statue in Iriga City commemorating the mano po gesture

"Of the civilities, terms of courtesy, and good breeding among the Filipinos. Chapter XVI.
...As among them it is not courtesy to remain standing before a person whom they respect, they seat themselves upon the ground, or rather on their heel-bones. Seated in this way, with head uncovered and the potong thrown like a towel over the left shoulder, they talk with their superiors. The mode of salutation upon entering or meeting anyone is as follows: They draw the body together and make a low reverence, raising one or both hands to the face, and placing them upon the cheeks; they next sit down waiting for the question that may be put to them, for it is considered bad manners to speak before one is spoken to..." — Fr. Pedro Chirino, Relacion de Islas Filipinas

— Edited by Emma H. Blair and James A. Robertson, The Philippine Islands, 1493-1898: Volume XII (1904)

"422. The natives of these islands employ innumerable other elegancies and courtesies, now in actions, now in words, now in names and titles, which they apply to themselves; these are various according to the difference of the provinces, and are too numerous to mention, for they are ceremonial, and they value their ceremonies highly. No one will pass in front of another, without asking permission, and in order to pass, he doubles the whole body with the most profound bow, at the same time lifting one foot in the air, and doubling the knee and lifting both hands to the face. If one has to talk to any person of higher rank, he shows all reverence and squats down [pone en cuclillas], with raised face, and waits thus, until he is asked his reason for coming; for to speak without being questioned would be a point of bad breeding." — Fr. Juan de San Antonio, Cronicas (1738)

— Edited by Emma H. Blair and James A. Robertson, The Philippine Islands, 1493-1898: Volume XL (1906), Chapter XLI

== Origin ==
The custom of mano, although the name itself originates from Spanish, actually dates from pre-colonial times. As a result later on to modern times, Filipinos adopted this tradition as a sign of respect to one’s elders through the “mano”, lit. 'hand' in Spanish. A similar custom is also followed by neighboring countries like Indonesia, Malaysia, and Brunei. In these countries, however, the custom is called salim originating from Arabic. Salim is also done in the family to respect elder family members and relatives. Salim is also a normal gesture done in traditional Islamic society to respect the ulama (religious elite/scholars).

== Usage and context ==
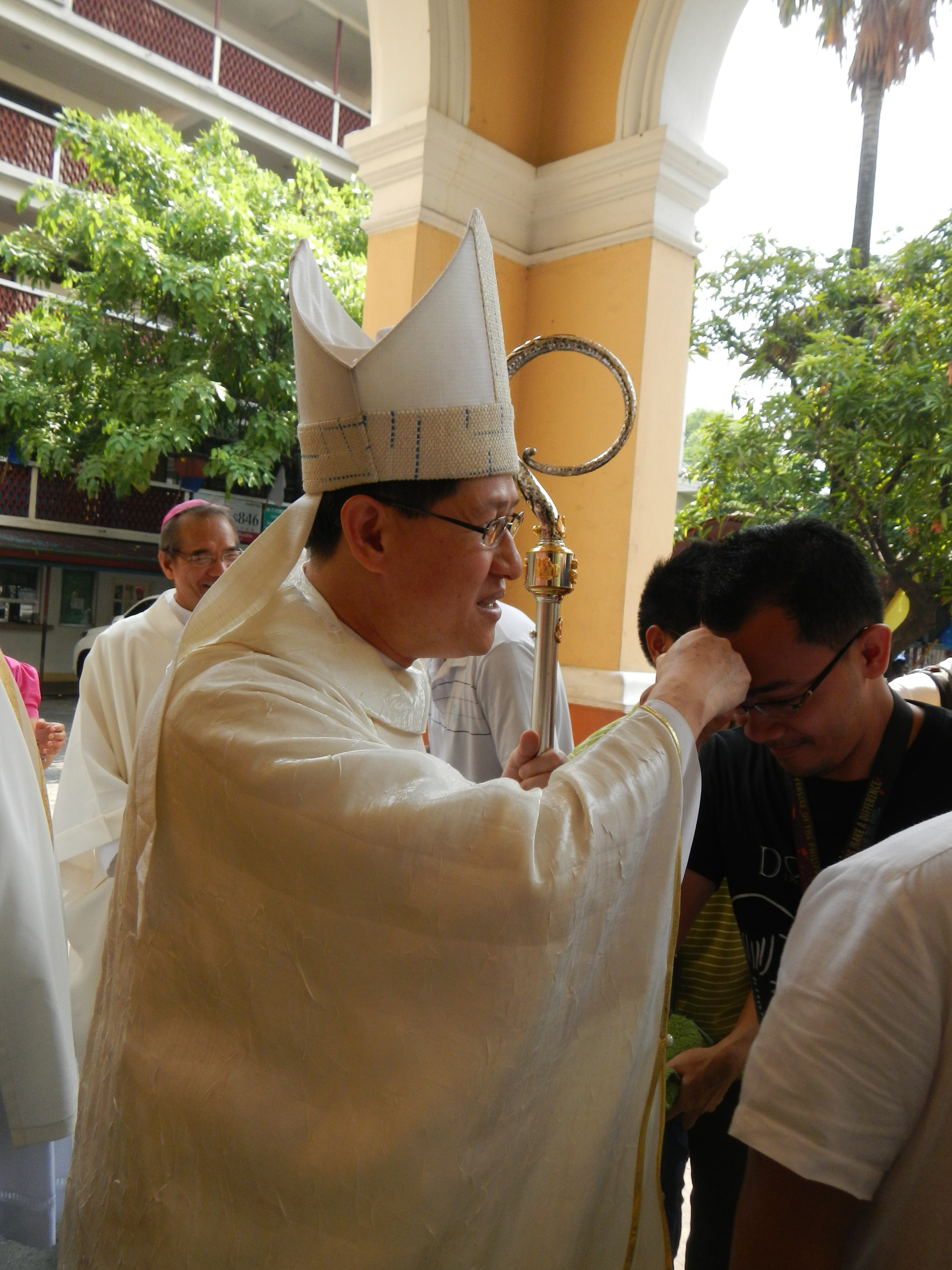
Archbishop Luis Antonio Tagle extending a mano gesture to a member of the congregation after mass at the San Fernando de Dilao Church

In today's Philippine setting, the mano is still used by Filipinos as a sign of respect to their elders. It is usually done when the elder is seen for the first time in the day or upon entering a house or gathering. There is no age limit for the usage of the mano, but it is usually practiced on those older by at least one generation. So it applies to parents, aunts, uncles, and grandparents; but not older cousins or siblings.

By offering your hand to mano, you are allowing yourself to be subservient to the elder to accept their blessing and wisdom. It is considered impolite if one does not exercise the custom of pagmamano when entering the home of an elder or after seeing them at a gathering.

The respect for elders stems from the value of family in Filipino culture. The elderly usually live with their children or/and grandchildren. Thus the nursing business is almost nonexistent in the Philippines.

Though the mano po gesture is usually practiced on one's parents, grandparents, uncles, and aunts, it is not restricted to one’s relatives. Godparents are often greeted this way as well, as are Catholic priests alongside the European practice of hand-kissing. Today it is commonly seen after a Catholic Mass, when members of the congregation pay respects to the clergy who have done the liturgy.

Filipinos extend the mano to many elders outside the family is as it is common to address older non-relations as "grandfather/mother, aunt, uncle, etc." It is a means of acknowledging their age and the respect due them; not doing considered grossly disrespectful as is first-name familiarity - a sensibility also found in other Asian societies. Filipinos treat friends and acquaintances like family.

The mano po gesture is usually responded to by with some form of "God bless you" or "May the Lord have mercy on you" by the elder; a small Sign of the Cross may be traced over the recipient. The invocation of mercy is given when the pagmamano is performed with both hands to ask for an elder's forgiveness, not unlike the salim. With both hands, the younger person takes the elder's hands and lifts them to the forehead to formally ask pardon for an offence. This may be done while kneeling and weeping and it is the highest version of the pagmamano.

== Similar Filipino customs ==
=== Beso-Beso ===
The beso is a common greeting in the Philippines similar to the mano. The beso-beso is a cheek-to-cheek kiss. The beso is more commonly used amongst the upper classes as a greeting to relatives and close friends, but is not reserved for an older person unlike the mano.

=== Po and opo ===
Similar to the mano po gesture, po and opo are also distinctly Filipino ways of showing respect to one's elders. The po is usually affixed to the end of sentences or phrases when one is addressing someone older than him or her. For example, paumanhin in Filipino means sorry. To an elder, one would say paumanhin po, The word po alone has origins as a respectful honorific but in contemporary times, it does not carry its past implications anymore besides its contemporary meaning to add formality as a sign of respect. This is why it is always affixed to mano (as mano po) when one is requesting the blessing of an elder.

== See also ==
- Filipino values
- Philippine kinship
- Filipino styles and honorifics
