= Salutation =

Greeting word or phrase

A salutation is a greeting used in a letter or other communication. Salutations can be formal or informal. The most common form of salutation in an English letter includes the recipient's given name or title. For each style of salutation, there is an accompanying style of complimentary close, known as valediction. Examples of non-written salutations include bowing (common in Japan), waving, or addressing someone by their name. A salutation can be interpreted as a signal in which the receiver of the salutation is being acknowledged, respected, or thanked. Another simple but typical example of a salutation is a military salute. By saluting another rank, that person is signalling or showing their acknowledgement of the importance or significance of that person and their rank. Some greetings are considered vulgar, others "rude", and others "polite".

== Usage ==
The salutation "Dear" in combination with a name or a title is by far the most commonly used in both British and US English, in both formal and informal correspondence. It is commonly followed either by an honorific and a surname, such as "Dear Mr. Smith," or by a given name, such as "Dear Mark." However, it is not common in English to use both a title of address and a person's given name: "Dear Mr. John Smith" would not be a common form. Sometimes, the salutation "To" is used for informal correspondence, for example, "To Peter".

A comma follows the salutation and name, while a colon is used in place of a comma only in US business correspondence. This rule applies regardless of the level of formality of the correspondence.

If the name of the intended recipient is unknown, acceptable salutations are:

Dear Sir or Madam (If the gender of the reader is unknown).
To Whom It May Concern (If the writer wishes to exclude the gender of the reader from the salutation and/or to convey that the reader should forward the copy to one more suited to receive or respond appropriately).
Dear Sir (If the reader is male).
Dear Madam (If the reader is female).

In older British usage and current US usage, the abbreviations, "Ms", "Mr", "Dr", and "Mrs" are typically followed by a period (full stop), but it is common in recent British usage to drop the period after all such titles. Professional titles such as "Professor" are frequently used both in business and in social correspondence, as are those of dignitaries and holders of certain public offices, such as "Mr. President" or "Dear Madam Secretary".

"Ms." is the marital-status-neutral honorific for an adult woman and may be applied in cases in which the marital status is irrelevant or unknown to the author. For example, if one is writing a business letter to a woman, "Ms." is acceptable. "Mrs." denotes an adult woman who is married. "Miss" can apply specifically to unmarried women; however, the term is being replaced more and more by "Ms.". "Miss" can apply to an unmarried woman or, more generally, to a younger woman.

"Miss" is the proper form of address for female children and unmarried women, although some consider the latter use to be dated. "Master" is used in formal situations to address boys typically aged under 16; after that, it is "Mr." "Master" in this case is of Old English origin.

Messrs. or Messieurs is a historically used term to address many men rather than "Mr Pink, Mr White, et al." Messrs is the abbreviation (pronounced "messers") for messieurs and is used in English. Mesdames addresses many women; pronounced "Meydammes".

On occasion, one may use "Sir" or "Madam" by itself as the salutation, with nothing preceding. The severe and old-fashioned formality of such a salutation makes it appropriate for very formal correspondence (for example, addressing a head of state, or a letter to the editor), but in the same way, the formality and stiffness of such a salutation would make its use in friendly social correspondence inappropriate..

== In popular culture ==
In E.B. White's book Charlotte's Web, the eponymous character says: "Salutations!" when first meeting protagonist pig Wilbur.

== See also ==
- Honorific
- English honorifics, e.g., Miss, Mrs, Ms, Mr, Sir, Dr, Lady, Lord
- Forms of address, i.e., Styles and manner of address
- Salute
