= Valediction =

Expression used to say farewell

A valediction (derivation from Latin vale dicere 'to say farewell'), parting phrase, or complimentary close in American English, is an expression used to say farewell, especially a word or phrase used to end a letter or message, or a speech made at a farewell.

A valediction's counterpart is a greeting called a salutation.

== Oral valedictions ==
Parting phrases are used to acknowledge the parting of individuals or groups of people from each other. They are an element of parting traditions. Parting phrases are specific to culture and situation, and vary based on the social status and relationship of the persons involved.

=== Religious and traditional parting phrases ===
- "As-Salamu Alaykum" or "Salam" ("Peace be upon you"), used among Muslims and Arabs
- "Goodbye", an English parting phrase used in the West, is a contraction of "God be by ye".
- "Khuda Hafiz" ("God protect (you)"), used among Iranians and South Asian Muslims
- "Namaste", parting phrase of Indian origin
- "Shalom" ("Peace"), used among Jewish people as a parting and greeting phrase

== Written valedictions ==
Valedictions normally immediately precede the signature in written correspondence. The word or words used express respect, esteem, or regard for the person to whom the correspondence is directed, and the exact form used depends on a number of factors.

In British English, valedictions have largely been replaced by the use of "Yours sincerely" or "Yours faithfully". "Yours sincerely" is typically employed in English when the recipient is addressed by name (e.g. "Dear John", "Dear Mr. Smith"), whereas "Yours faithfully" is used when the recipient is not addressed by name (i.e., the recipient is addressed by a phrase such as "Dear Sir/Madam").

=== Formal usage ===
Historically, valedictions were often elaborate and formal. Vestiges of such formality remain in various cases. The examples below are subject to some variation but generally follow the pattern described.

==== United Kingdom ====
- Letters to the King of the United Kingdom should end, "I have the honour to remain, Sir, Your Majesty's most humble and obedient servant." Alternatively, "I remain, with the profoundest veneration, your Majesty's most faithful subject and dutiful servant."
- Letters to other members of the royal family should end, "I have the honour to remain, Sir/Madam, Your Royal Highness's most humble and obedient servant."
- Letters to ambassadors should end, "I have the honour to be, with the highest consideration, Your Excellency's obedient servant."
- Letters to high commissioners should end, "I have the honour to be Your Excellency's obedient servant."
- Letters to the pope should end, "I have the honour to be Your Holiness's most devoted and obedient child." (substituting "obedient servant" if not a Roman Catholic).
- Letters to a cardinal should end, "I have the honour to be, My Lord Cardinal, Your Eminence's devoted and obedient child." (substituting "obedient servant" if not a Roman Catholic).
- Letters to a Catholic archbishop should end, "I have the honour to be Your Grace's devoted and obedient child." (substituting "obedient servant" if not a Roman Catholic).
- Letters to a Catholic bishop should end, "I have the honour to be Your Lordship's obedient child." (substituting "obedient servant" if not a Roman Catholic).
- Letters to a Catholic abbot should end, "I beg to remain, my Lord Abbot, your devoted and obedient servant."

=== Nazi Germany ===
In correspondence between high-ranking Nazi officials, letters were usually signed with the valediction "Heil Hitler". This practice ended with the fall of Nazi Germany and denazification.

=== Business usage in the United States ===
The following table contains complimentary closings as recommended for business hard-letter use by two American authorities: Barron's Educational Series and American Management Association (AMACOM).

Closing	Recommended use
Yours truly,	"formal closing" (Barron's); "no personal connection between writer and recipient" (AMACOM)
Very truly yours,	"no personal connection between writer and recipient" (AMACOM)
Respectfully yours,	"formal closing" (Barron's); to person of acknowledged authority or "great formality" (AMACOM)
Sincerely, or Sincerely yours,	"less formal closing" (Barron's); personal and business relationship (AMACOM)
Cordially,	"less formal closing" (Barron's)
Cordially yours,	often used, but it is "incorrect" (AMACOM)
Regards, Personal regards, Kindest regards, Best regards,	"personal closing" (Barron's)
Best wishes,	Formal email sign off (AMACOM)

=== Diplomatic usage ===
A diplomatic note verbale always ends with an elaborate valediction, most commonly "[Sender] avails itself of this opportunity to renew to [recipient] the assurances of its highest consideration".

=== Valedictions in e-mail ===
Valedictions in formal e-mail are similar to valedictions in letters; on the whole, they are variations of "regards" and "yours". However, a wide range of popular valedictions are used in casual e-mail but very rarely in letters.

=== Other forms ===
- "Yours aye" is a Scottish expression meaning "Yours always", still commonly used as a valediction to end written correspondence in the Royal Navy and British Army, and occasionally used by sailors or people working in a maritime context. It is commonly used in the Royal Australian Navy as a sign-off in written communication such as emails.
- "Yours, etc." is used historically for abbreviated endings. It can be found in older newspaper letters to the editor, and often in US legal correspondence. "&c." may be seen as an alternative abbreviation of et cetera, the ampersand functioning as a ligature form of "et". "I am, etc." and "I remain, etc." are also used.

=== United States military usage ===
Current regulations of the United States Department of Defense, the Joint Chiefs of Staff, the U.S. Air Force, the U.S. Army, and the U.S. Navy call for two complimentary closings for letters: "Respectfully yours" and "Sincerely". "Respectfully yours" is reserved for the president (and, for the Army only, the president's spouse) and the president-elect. "Sincerely" is used in all other cases. E-mail sent to other servicemembers uses "Very respectfully" (senior in rank to signer) and "Respectfully" (junior in rank to signer).

== Phrases from fictional works ==
- "Hasta la vista, baby" and "I'll be back", both popularized by The Terminator entertainment franchise
- "Live long and prosper", a Vulcan salute from the Star Trek entertainment franchise
- "May the Force be with you", a parting phrase from the Star Wars entertainment franchise

== See also ==
- Business letter
- Greeting
- Salutation
- The Parting Glass
