= Etiquette in South Korea =

In South Korea, etiquette, or the code of social behavior that governs human interactions, is largely derived from Korean Confucianism and focuses on the core values of this religion. In addition to general behaviour, etiquette in South Korea also determines how to behave with responsibility and social status. Although most aspects of etiquette are accepted by the country at large, customs can be localized to specific regions or influenced by other cultures, namely China, Japan, and the United States.

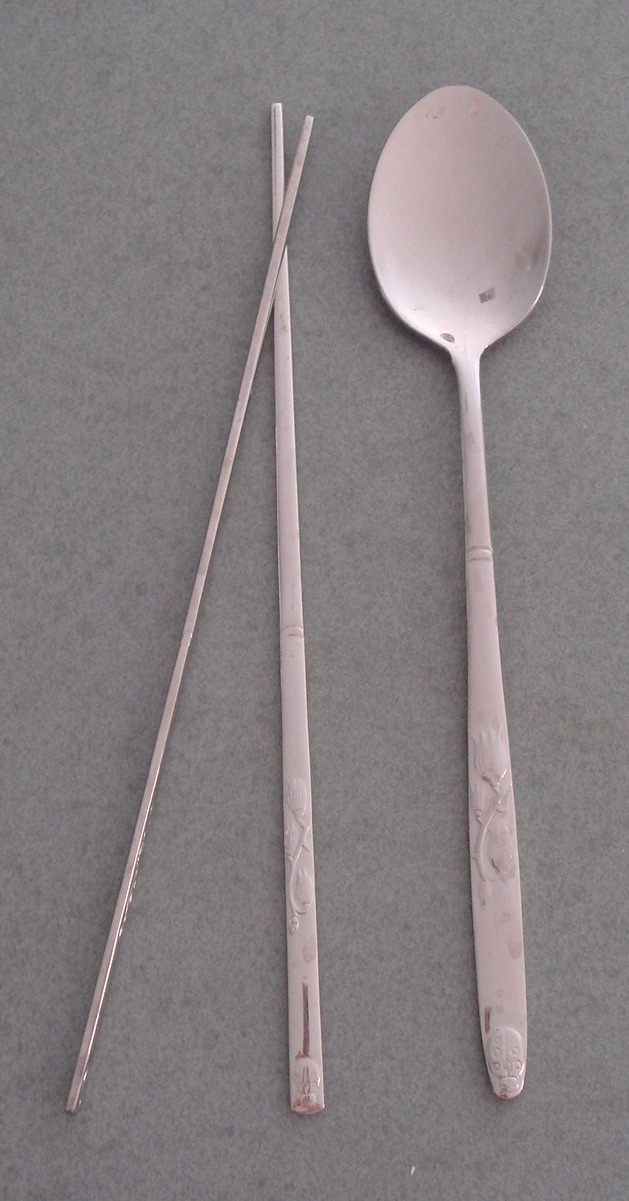
South Korean chopsticks and spoon.

== General ==
There are several points of etiquette in South Korea that are defined by either cultural taboos or broader concerns about manners. The following three practices are examples of widespread and recognizable concerns to native South Koreans as a whole:

- Using the number four is considered unlucky, even ominous, as the pronunciation of the word 'four' and the Chinese character '死' (meaning death) are similar. It is also considered bad luck to select the fourth floor in an elevator, some are even built without a fourth floor button. Gifts are also rarely given in multiples of four, whereas giving items in multiples of seven is considered lucky and a wish for good fortune.
- These taboos are however, mere superstitions which only very conservative and older, more traditional people believe. Korean youth may be aware of these superstitions, but may only practice them out of habit or culture.
- Dressing well is important in South Korea; it is considered a sign of respect. Wearing a suit and tie is typically appropriate in formal situations, such as meeting new people. South Koreans also dress well for civic activities, especially in larger cities like Seoul.

== Greetings and body language ==
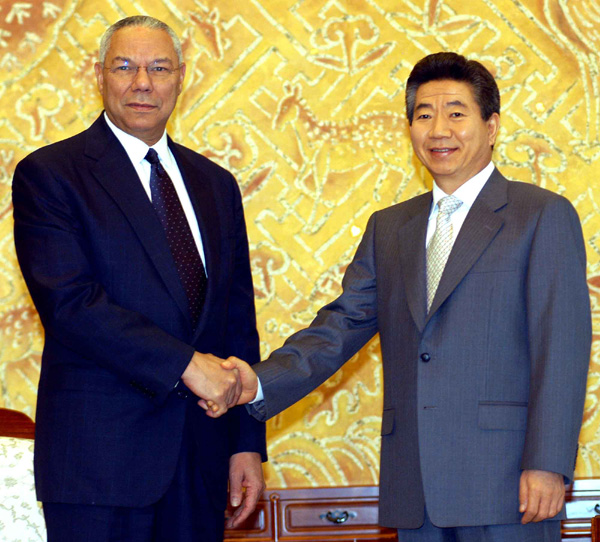
Colin Powell & Roh Moo-hyun shaking hands.

South Koreans are reserved and well-mannered people. South Korea is a land of strict Confucian hierarchy and etiquette is important. In respect much can be said on the differences on how to conduct oneself as a male South Korean and a female South Korean. The bow is the traditional Korean greeting, although it is often accompanied by a handshake among men. To show respect when shaking hands, support your right forearm with your left hand. South Korean women usually nod slightly. Western women may offer their hand to a Korean man. Bow when departing. Younger people wave (move their arm from side to side). South Koreans consider it a personal violation to be touched by someone who is not a relative or close friend. Touching, patting, or back slapping is to be avoided during interactions. In addition, direct eye contact between juniors and seniors should be avoided because it is seen as impolite or even a challenge. Korea is one of the most demographically homogeneous countries in the world, racially and linguistically. It has its own culture, language, dress and cuisine, separate and distinct from its neighboring countries. Hard work, filial piety and modesty are characteristics esteemed by Koreans. Due to filial piety and the nature of how women are raised in South Korea, there are some acts of etiquette that do not apply to men. Women dress modestly; dress should not be form fitting and revealing. However, this etiquette of gender difference has changed and is less common than it used to be.

== Eating and drinking ==
Table etiquette in South Korea can be traced back to the Confucian philosophies of the Joseon period. Traditionally when dining, South Koreans use cushions to sit on the floor and eat from a low table. The floor is generally heated by the ondol, an underfloor heating system. This custom is still common at many restaurants in South Korea. The dining area in a restaurant is generally on a raised platform, and visitors are expected to remove their shoes before stepping onto it. Today, most restaurants also have tables and chairs for visitors who feel uncomfortable sitting on the floor.

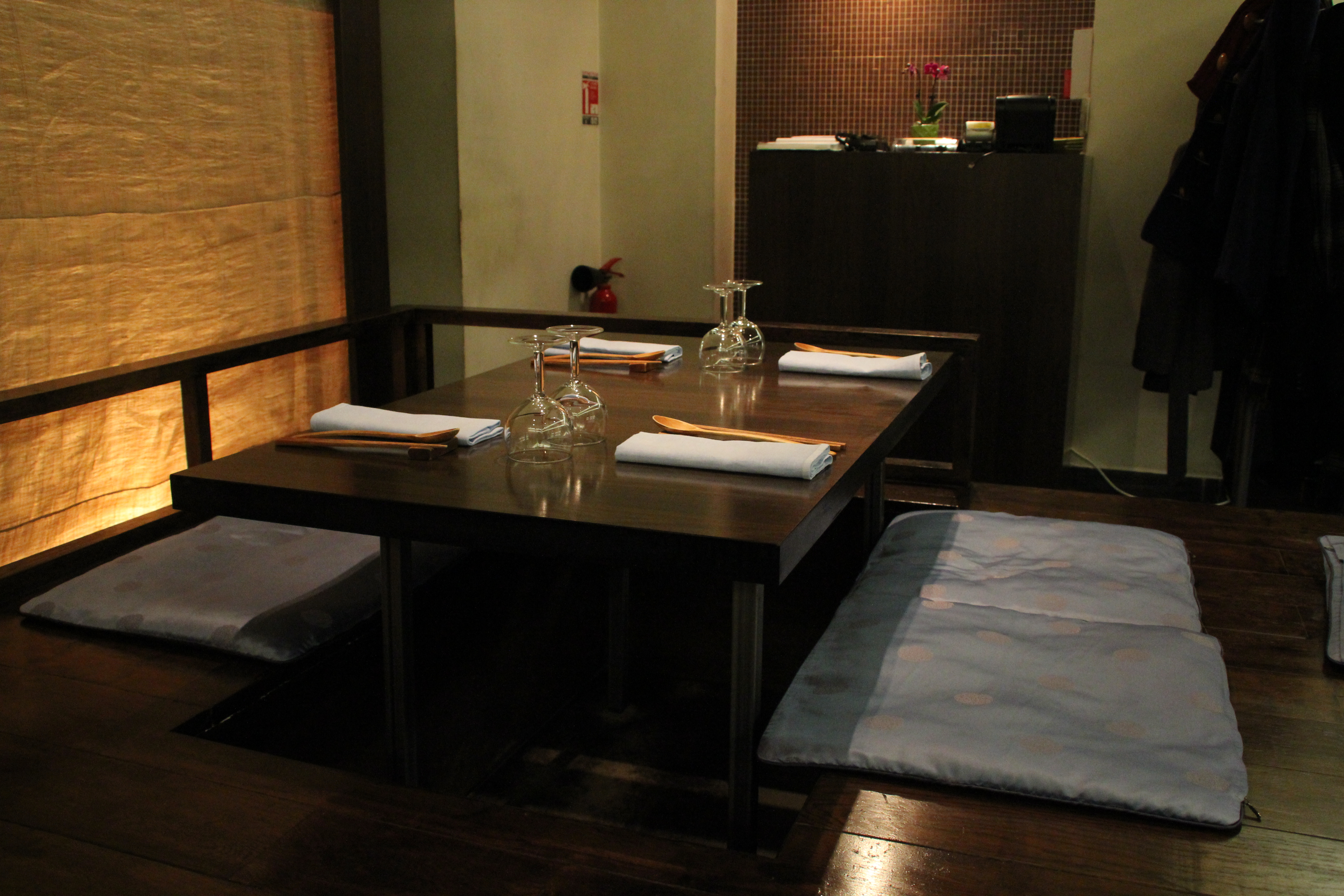
South Korean restaurant, Marou.

=== Eating ===
Unlike the Chinese or Japanese, South Koreans never raise a rice bowl to their mouth. During a meal, bowls and dishes remain on the table. It is also unacceptable to speak of smelly or dirty things when having meals with others, or to eat too slowly or quickly. Blowing one's nose at the table, even if the meal is spicy, is considered mildly offensive. If such an action is necessary, it is recommended to leave the table or otherwise be discreet. South Koreans use chopsticks when they are eating, however, South Korean chopsticks are made from stainless steel. During a meal, these chopsticks are not to be thrown on the table because of the noise. Similarly, spoons should not touch plates because they may make a clashing sound. Chopsticks and spoons should never be put into food, particularly rice, in a standing-up position because it resembles food offerings at a grave for deceased ancestors, and it is therefore considered bad luck.

=== Drinking ===
In restaurants and bars, pouring one's own drink is seen as a faux pas. It is generally preferred that hosts fill the drinks of their company, and the company should do the same for the host. Therefore, paying attention to other's drink glasses and filling them when empty is a common procedure at bars, parties, and other social settings. If one does not wish to drink any further, that person is to simply leave their glass full. Tradition states that guests should not refuse the first drink offered by a host. If a guest refuses a drink up to three times, that specific guest will not be offered anymore.

When adult guests are asked to pour a drink, they are expected to offer the drink respectfully with two hands. When pouring alcoholic drinks, guests should hold the cup with their right hand and the wrist of their right hand should be held lightly with their left hand. Guests are expected to always pass and receive objects with their right hand or with two hands, and to never use their left hand alone.

The same etiquette applies when adult guests receive alcoholic drinks. However, if elders offer alcoholic drinks to younger guests, the guests should take the drink and politely show gratitude by saying "thank you". If the alcoholic drink is beer, it is proper for younger guests to turn their heads. These actions please elders because when someone of a higher social standing pours a drink, it is considered proper for the less significant person to turn away.

== Housewarming ==
Housewarming in South Korea is called jib-deu-li (집들이), and it involves the customary practice of hosting a small gathering after moving into a new home. Friends, relatives, and neighbors are shown around the house while being served food and drinks. Traditionally, the owner of the new home would invite a shaman (무당 mudang) to perform a shamanist ritual (gut) on the evening of move-in day. However, today people prefer to celebrate the completion of home construction somewhat differently. In Ongjin-gun, Gyeonggi Province, it is called the deulchari (들차리), and the owner will select an evening to invite friends and villagers to show them around while serving them food. The food served is usually bibimbap (비빔밥) mixed with rice, bean sprouts, and gangtu (a type of seaweed). People celebrate late into the night by playing an hourglass-shaped drum (장구 janggu) and singing. People who live in the Seongnam area have a similar celebration when they build or move into a new home. Their guests prepare matches or candles, which symbolizes their wishes for the household to rise and prosper. People offer detergent and toilet paper as moving-in presents, which signifies that everything will go well.

== Gifts and gift-giving ==
Many South Koreans give gifts to each other to celebrate birthdays, weddings, and holidays such as New Year and Chuseok. People give a variety of gifts, however, the kind of gift depends on who is receiving the gift and when. For a wedding, many South Koreans give brides and grooms money as a gift, however, best friends of the couple will give them household appliances. During the holidays, South Koreans give gifts to their parents and superiors, such as ribs, fruit, wine, and/or gift cards. Neighbors often receive cooking oil, a can of tuna, or gim.

== Funerals ==
In South Korea, going to a funeral involves praying for the deceased person to rest in heaven, and is related to filial piety. Funerals and rituals are ceremonies organized by family and it is considered their responsibility to oversee them. Recently, funeral customs have significantly changed. For example, many people now prefer to have small funerals and be cremated rather than buried.

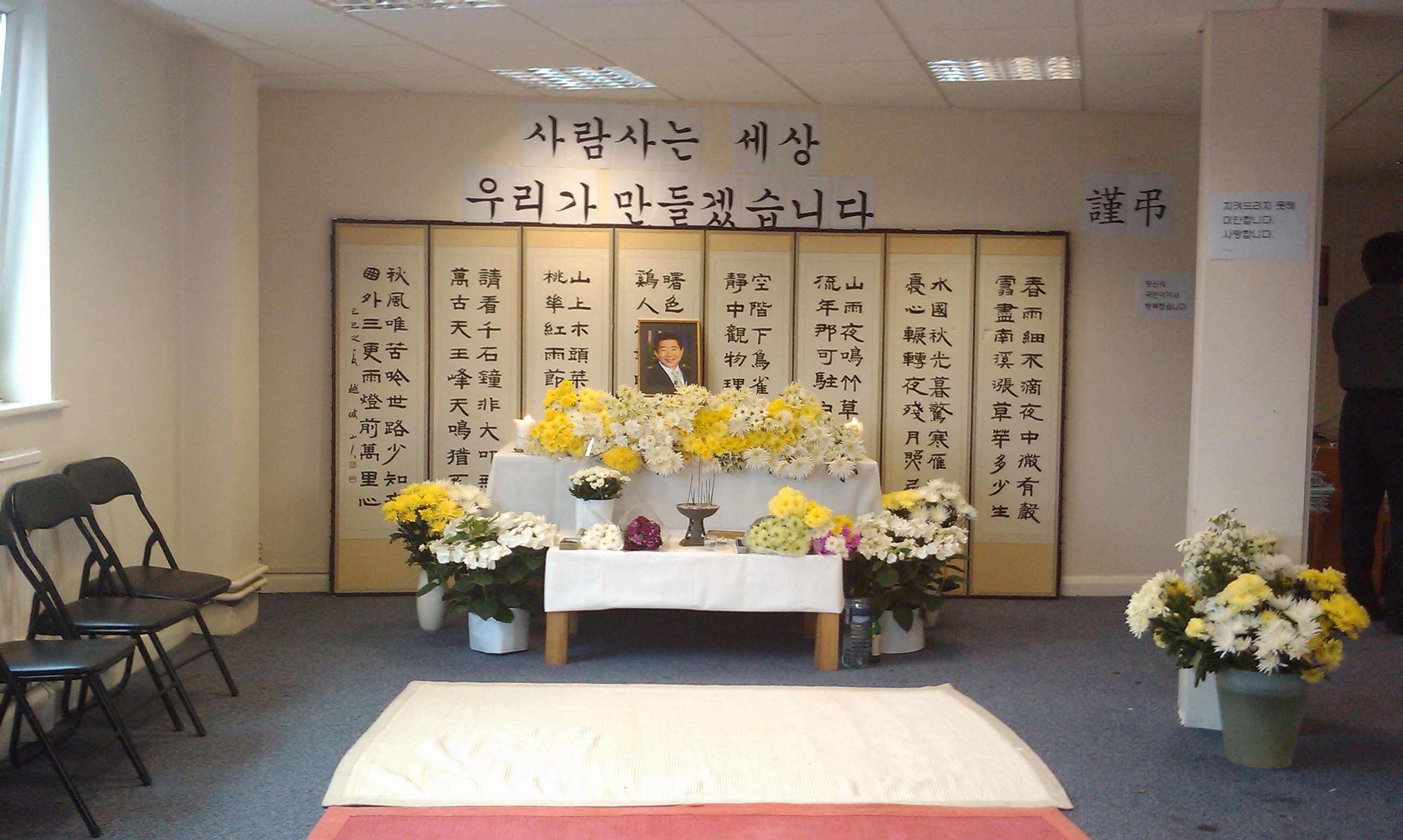
A funeral in South Korea.

=== Making a condolence call ===
In South Korea, the phrase "condolence call" means to show sadness towards those who are deceased and give condolence to mourners. In South Korea, a condolence call is called Jomun [조문(弔問)] or Munsang [문상(問喪)]. If an individual is older than the person who has died, that individual only has to bow to the primary mourner.

=== Offering flowers ===
When offering flowers at a funeral, the blossoms of the flowers should face the deceased as a symbol of the flower ceremony.

=== Bowing ===
Unlike the usual formal bow, at a funeral, a man bows by placing his left hand on top of his right. Conversely, a woman bows by placing her right hand on top of her left. People should bow one time for those who are alive and twice for those who are deceased.

== Special birthdays ==
=== Doljanchi ===
A doljanchi or dol (돌잔치) is a traditional South Korean first birthday celebration. Long ago, when medical science was unable to cure many diseases and malnutrition was common, infants rarely survived to their first birthday. Therefore, the dol became a milestone that blessed a child with a prosperous future and celebrated a baby's survival. Many of the traditional customs are still included in the modern day dol. It is one of the most important birthdays a South Korean will celebrate. The highlight of the dol ritual is to foretell the baby's future by offering a variety of items to the baby and watching to see which one he/she picks up; a brush symbolizes a scholar, a bundle of thread means a long life, and money symbolizes wealth. Rice signifies that the baby will never go hungry, which was an important issue when people suffered famines. For a boy, the selection of a bow and arrow presumes that he will become a military commander. For a girl, the selection of scissors or needles presumes that she will grow up to be a great craftswoman.

=== Hwan-gab ===
A hwangab (환갑; 還甲) in South Korea is a traditional way of celebrating one's 60th birthday. The number '60' signifies the completion of one big circle and the start of another in one's life, which is recognized as the traditional sexagenary cycle of the lunar calendar. In the past, the average life expectancy was much lower than sixty; therefore, it also celebrated longevity and the wish for an even longer, prosperous life. The celebration is customarily thrown by the children of the individual who is turning sixty, many relatives help by preparing an abundance of food. With the advent of modern health care, this occurrence is much more common than it used to be. Many South Koreans now take trips with their families instead of having a big party to celebrate their 60th birthday. Parties are also thrown when a person reaches 70 and 80 years old, which is called a Gohi (고희) and Palsun (팔순).

== See also ==
- Culture of Korea
- Korean cuisine
- Public holidays in South Korea
- Korean birthday celebrations
- Traditional Korean thought
- Marriage in South Korea

=== Etiquette in other regions ===
- Etiquette in Africa
- Etiquette in Asia
- Etiquette in Australia and New Zealand
- Etiquette in Canada and the United States
- Etiquette in Japan
- Etiquette in Latin America
- Etiquette in the Middle East
