= Languages of the Netherlands =

Languages of Netherlands
- Official: Dutch
- Regional: Frisian (2.50%), English (Caribbean Netherlands), Papiamento (Bonaire); Dutch Low Saxon (10.9%) Limburgish (4.50%)
- Minority: Yiddish, Romani
- Immigrant: See further: Immigration to the Netherlands
- Foreign: English (90–93%) (excluding the BES Islands); German (71%), French (29%), Spanish (5%)
- Signed: Dutch Sign Language
- Keyboard layout: US international QWERTY

Knowledge of foreign languages in the Netherlands, in percent of the population over 15, 2006. Data taken from an EU survey.

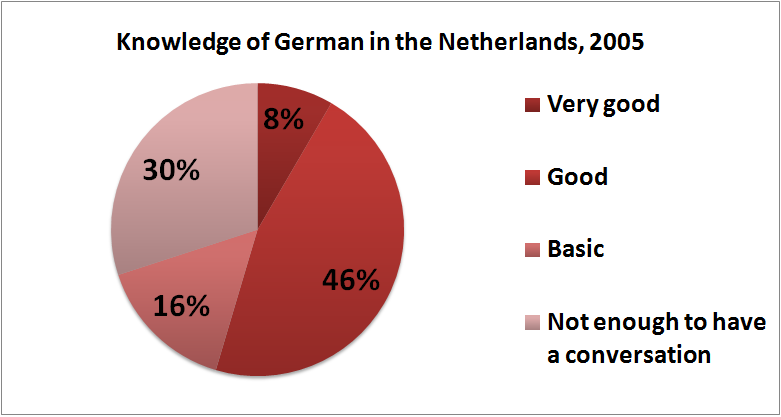
Knowledge of the German language in the Netherlands, 2005. According to the Eurobarometer: 70% of the respondents indicated that they know German well enough to have a conversation. Of these 12% (per cent, not percentage points) reported a very good knowledge of the language whereas 22% had a good knowledge and 43% basic German skills.

The predominant language of the Netherlands is Dutch, spoken and written by almost all people in the Netherlands. Dutch is also spoken and official in the Dutch Caribbean (Aruba, Curaçao, Sint Maarten and the Caribbean Netherlands special municipalities of Bonaire, Sint Eustatius, and Saba) as well as the Flemish Community of Belgium and Suriname. It is a West Germanic, Low Franconian language that originated in the Early Middle Ages (c. 470) and was standardised in the 16th century.

- West Frisian is a co-official language in the province of Friesland. West Frisian is spoken by 453,000 speakers.
- English is an official language in the special municipalities of Saba and Sint Eustatius (BES Islands), as well as the autonomous states of Curaçao and Sint Maarten. It is widely spoken on Saba and Sint Eustatius. On Saba and St. Eustatius, the majority of the education is in English only, with some bilingual English-Dutch schools. 90–93% of the Dutch people can also speak English as a foreign language (see also: English language in the Netherlands).
- Papiamento is an official language in the special municipality of Bonaire. It is also the native language in the autonomous states of Curaçao and Aruba.
- Several dialects of Dutch Low Saxon are spoken in much of the north-east of the country and are recognised as regional languages according to the European Charter for Regional or Minority Languages. Low Saxon is spoken by 1,798,000 speakers.
- Another Low Franconian dialect is Limburgish, which is spoken in the south-eastern province of Limburg. Limburgish is spoken by 825,000 speakers. There are movements to have Limburgish recognised as an official language (meeting with varying amounts of success, having previously been recognised as a regional language). Limburgish consists of many differing dialects that share some common aspects, but are quite different.

However, both Low Saxon and Limburgish spread across the Dutch-German border and belong to a common Dutch-German dialect continuum.

The Netherlands also has its separate Dutch Sign Language, called Nederlandse Gebarentaal (NGT). It has 17,500 users, and in 2021 received the status of recognised language.

Between 90% and 93% of the total population are able to converse in English, 71% in German, 29% in French and 5% in Spanish.

Most used language at home of Dutch citizens according to CBS in 2019
1. Dutch (76.2%)
2. Dutch dialects (5.40%)
3. Low Saxon (4.80%)
4. Limburgish (3.40%)
5. Frisian (2.00%)
6. Other Languages (8.20%)

== Minority languages, regional languages and dialects in the Benelux ==
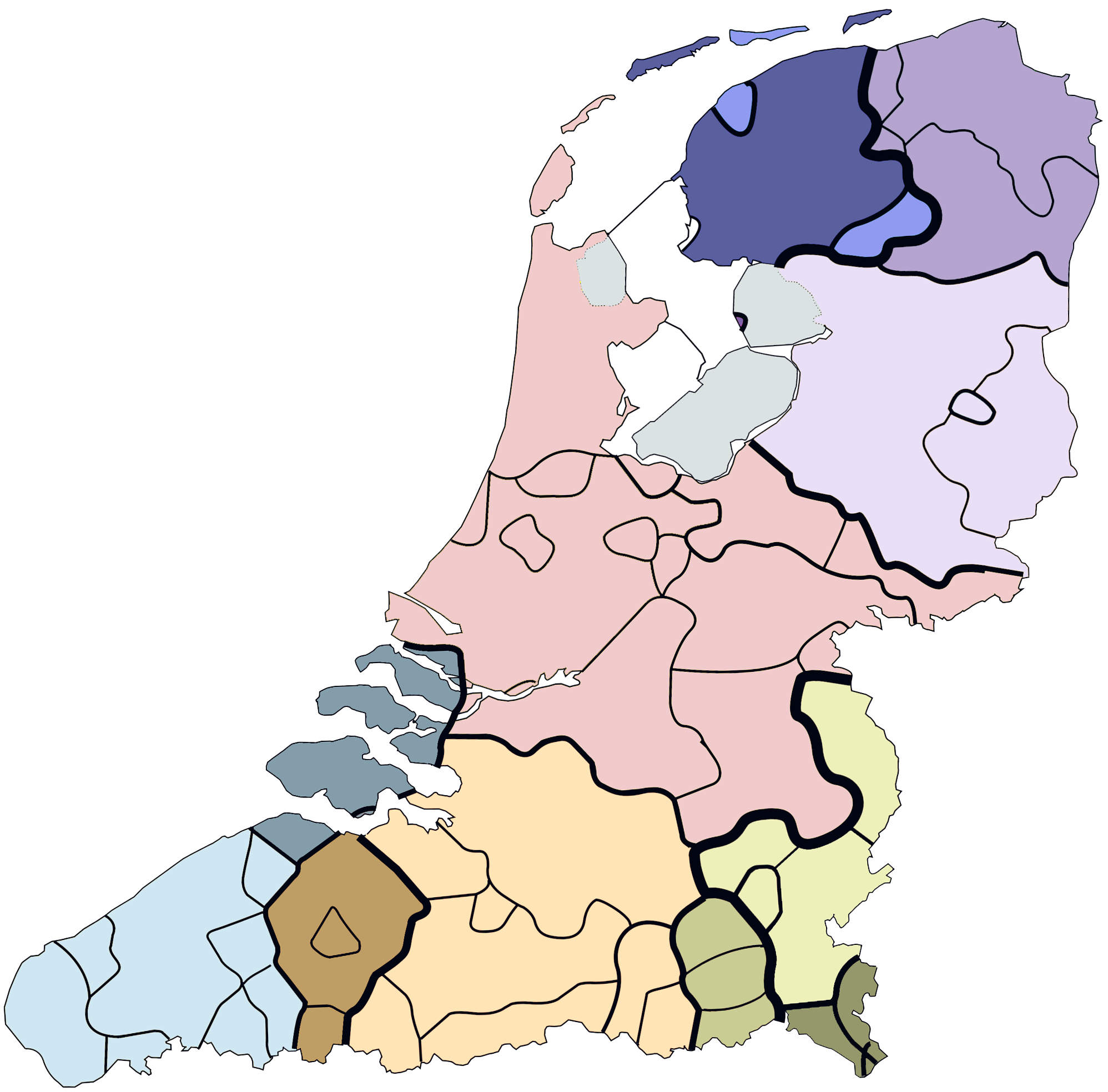
Minority languages, regional languages and dialects in the Netherlands and Belgium based on pronunciation differences using Levenshtein distance.: West Flanders; East Flanders; Brabant; Southwest Limburg; Northeast Luik; Zeeland; Limburg; Central Dutch varieties; Urk; Frisian mixed varieties; Frisian; Overijssel; Groningen

The varieties in the Netherlands can be grouped into a major Low Franconian group, the one around Almere and the rest. Limburg is divided into a small area around Weert, a large area until Venlo and an area North of this. There is another major group: Low Saxon divided into three areas. Urk is separate. Friesland hosts many of the varieties obtained. They can be divided into Frisian, archaic Frisian (Hindeloopen, Schiermonnikoog and Terschelling island), Friso-Franconian varieties (Frisian cities, Midsland, Ameland island and Het Bildt) and Friso-Saxon (in Stellingwerf and variously also Westerkwartier). Possible clustering includes the following possible categories not mentioned hitherto: Zeeland and Central Gelderland. Midsland, Ameland island and Het Bildt can be grouped together. Leeuwarden and possibly Sneek can be grouped together. Dokkum, Stavoren, Kollum and possibly Heerenveen can have single varieties.

=== West Frisian ===
West Frisian is an official language in the Dutch province of Friesland (Fryslân in West Frisian). The government of the Frisian province is bilingual. Since 1996 West Frisian has been recognised as an official minority language in the Netherlands under the European Charter for Regional or Minority Languages, although it had been recognised by the Dutch government as the second state language (tweede rijkstaal), with official status in Friesland, since the 1950s.

The mutual intelligibility in reading between Dutch and Frisian is limited. A cloze test in 2005 revealed native Dutch speakers understood 31.9% of a West Frisian newspaper, 66.4% of an Afrikaans newspaper and 97.1% of a Dutch newspaper.

- Westlauwers Frisian
  - Wood Frisian
  - Clay Frisian
  - Noordhoeks
  - Zuidwesthoeks
  - Hindeloopers
  - Westers
  - Aasters
  - Schiermonnikoogs

=== Low Saxon ===
- Northern Low Saxon
  - Gronings-East Frisian
    - Kollumerpompsters
    - Westerkwartiers
    - Hoogelandsters
    - Oldambtsters
    - Westerwolds
    - Veenkoloniaals
    - Stadsgronings
    - Noordenvelds (Noord-Drents)
- Westphalian
  - Midden-Drents
  - Zuid-Drents
  - Stellingwerfs
  - Guelderish-Overijssels
    - Urkish
    - Sallands
    - Achterhoeks
  - Twents
    - Oost-Twents
    - Vriezenveens (this is actually a separate dialect because of Westfalian influences)
  - Twents-Graafschaps
  - Veluws
    - Oost-Veluws
    - West-Veluws

=== Low Franconian ===
- Frisian mixed dialects
  - Stadsfries
  - Midlands
  - Amelands
  - Bildts
- Central Dutch
  - West Frisian
    - Mainland West Frisian
    - Insular West Frisian
  - Hollandic
    - Kennemerlandic
    - Zaans
    - Waterlandic
    - Amsterdams
    - Strand-Hollands
    - Haags
    - Rotterdams
    - Utrechts-Alblasserwaards
    - Westhoeks
  - Kleverlandish
    - Rivierenlands
    - Liemers
    - Nijmeegs
    - North Limburgian
  - Central north Brabantian
- Zeelandic-West Flemish (including French Flemish)
  - Zeelandic
  - Burger-Zeeuws
  - Coastal West Flemish
  - Continental West Flemish
- East Flemish
- Brabantian
  - Northwest Brabantian
  - East Brabantian
  - Kempen Brabantian
  - South Brabantian
- Limburgish
  - West Limburgish
  - Central Limburgish
  - East Limburgish

=== Central Franconian ===
- Ripuarian
  - Kerkrade dialect
  - Vaals dialect

Ripuarian is not recognised as a regional language of the Netherlands.
