= Etiquette in Haiti =

Etiquette in Haiti, is the set of conventional rules and norms that govern polite behavior in social groups, public or professional settings unique to Haitian Society. It is similar to other Latin American countries. The original customs combined with other influences such as the African, Spanish, French, Catholic and Native Taino Cultures make it unique.

== Generalizations ==
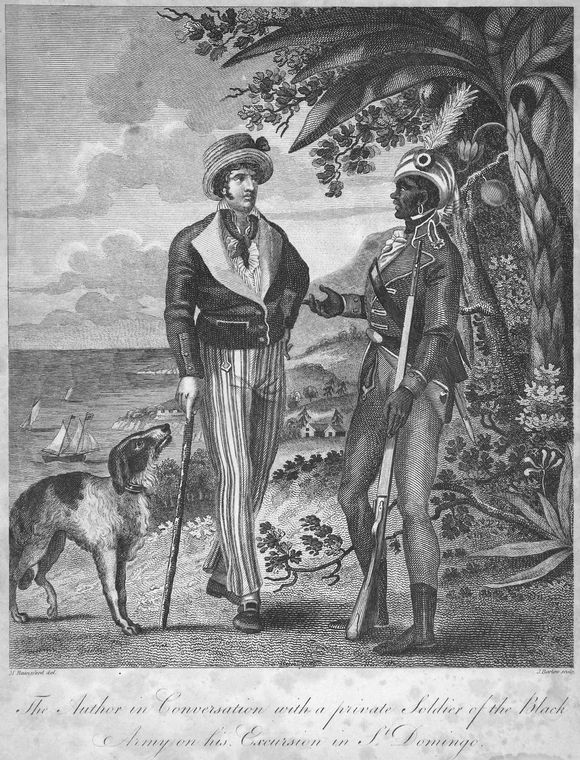
Colonial era Etiquette

=== In regards to Latin Culture ===
Map of Latin America

- Compared to much of the English-speaking world, people from areas of Latin America may demonstrate more relaxed and casual behaviour and be more comfortable with loud talk, exaggerated gestures and physical contact. It is common to greet known people by kissing them on the cheek.
- In addition, many Latin American people have a smaller sense of personal space than people from English-speaking cultures. It may be rude to step away from someone when they are stepping closer.
- At some finer restaurants, it may be considered rude for the staff to bring a customer the check without the customer first requesting it.
- It is considered impolite to "toss" objects to people instead of directly handing it to them.
- The American "come here" gesture of palm upwards with the fingers curled back can be considered a romantic solicitation.

== Haitian cultural norms ==
Haitians take proper behavior seriously and this includes good manners, clean appearances at all times, a moderate tone in one's speech, and avoidance of any profanity or public "scenes", as these are all important indicators of one's social class.

=== Philosophy ===
Haitian Creole: "Lekòl, Legliz, Lakay"
Literally meaning "School, Church, Home", the three are core pillars of traditional Haitian upbringing. This strict guiding framework provides strong discipline, cultural values. and a sense of community in Haitian culture.

Lekòl (School): Represents education, which is deeply valued in Haitian culture. As a vital tool for personal growth, discipline, betterment of social status, and family honor.

Legliz (Church): Represents faith, spirituality, and the church as a cornerstone for community gatherings, moral guidance, and family milestones like baptisms and weddings.

Lakay (Home): Represents family, roots, and the home as the first place where children learn manners, cultural identity, and the Creole language. At home kids are taught in a communal setting by family and fictive family members. Things such as respect, obedience, interdependence, solidarity, and etiquette as a child is taught. The Lakou System exemplifies this. As a system of communal living it roots from Konbit system from the slavery times.

==== Children's Etiquette ====
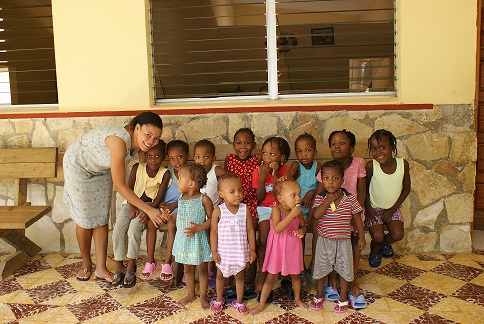
Kinderhuis_haiti

Children are to be seen and not heard; not to draw attention to one's self. It is especially disrespectful for children to

- whistle,
- point,
- suck their teeth
- stare
- roll their eyes at adults.
- sitting with their legs crossed
- and acting like an adult.

=== Manners of hygiene ===
- When attending church (whether it be Roman Catholic or Protestant), one's best formal shoes and clothes are to be worn.
- Flatulence, when company is present, is very rude and should be done in another unoccupied place. It is polite to say "excusez-moi" (Haitian Creole: eskize'm), which means "excuse me".

=== Manners of courtesy ===
- Entering a household and not greeting the elders or owners of the household is regarded as highly offensive. Say bonjou (good morning) or bonswa (good afternoon) when entering a room or passing by someone on the street.
- It is rude to point at someone.

==== Social Events ====
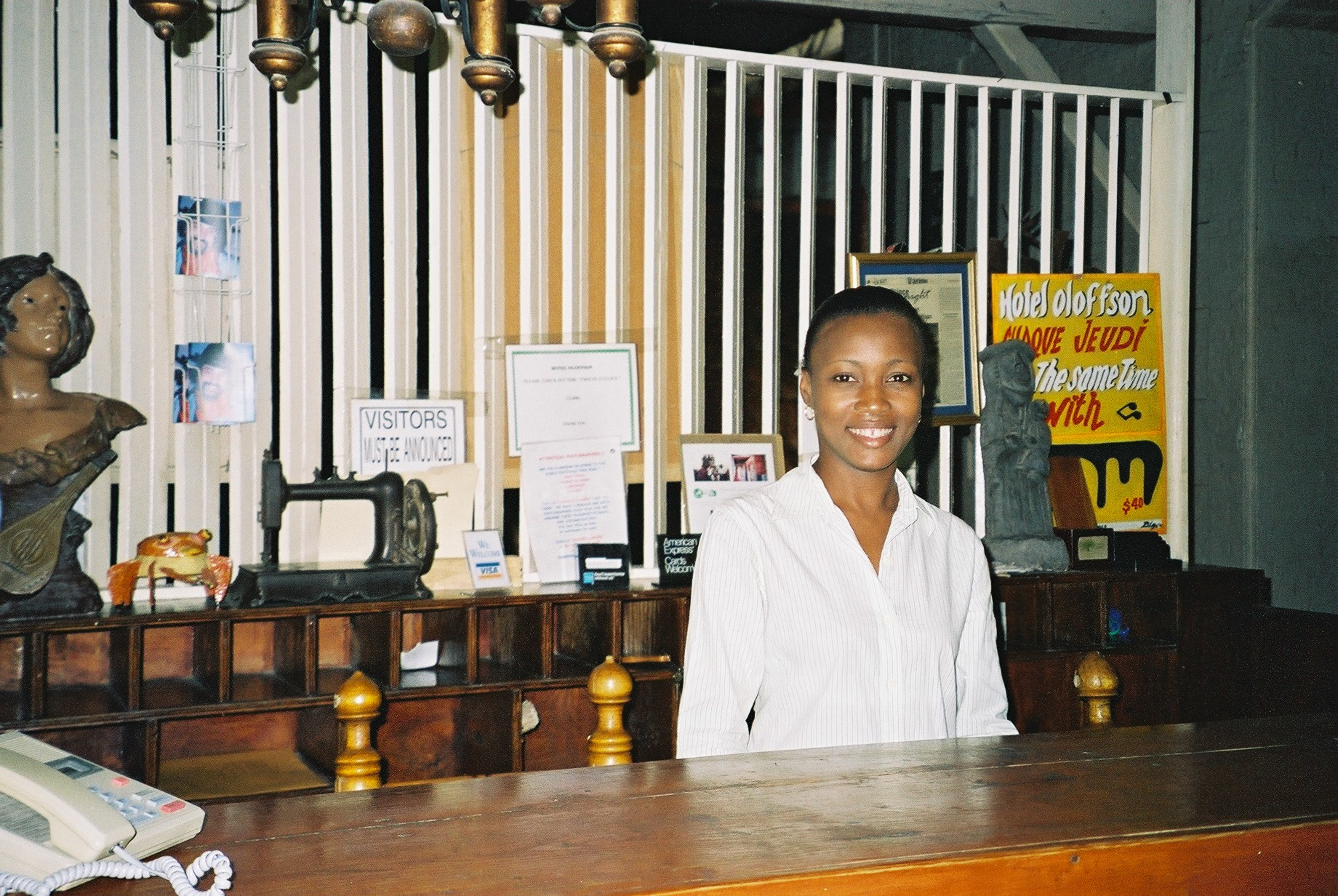
Port_au_Prince_-_hotel_Olofson

- Punctuality in an informal setting is not highly valued and being late is usually not considered rude.
- Men shake hands on meeting and departing. Men and women kiss on the cheek when greeting. Women kiss each other on the cheek. Friends, family and close acquaintances usually share a light kiss on the cheek.
- People holding hands is an ordinary display of friendship though women and men, but seldom show public affection toward the opposite sex but are affectionate in private. It is also common for people of the same sexes to hold hands, and is often mistakenly viewed as homosexuality to outsiders.

Dining Etiquette

- Eating is considered a social event and so withdrawing from the center of activities during meals is considered slightly offensive.
- At restaurants, the one who extended the invitation pays the bill. Unless another woman is present, a woman should not buy dinner for a man. Making arrangements for payment before the meal is considered especially polite. When summoning a server, make eye contact; waving or calling their names is very impolite.
- At the dining table, the European etiquette applies; ladies sit first, fork on the left, elbows off the table, etc. When utensils are not being used, a person's hands are expected to be visible above the table resting the wrists on top of the table and not at one's lap. Diners are expected to stay at the table for the entire meal; no bathroom breaks.
- While dining, for making a toast, the most common toast is sante (to your health). When beginning to eat wait until after the host says "bon appetit!" ("enjoy your meal!").

Discussion

- Avoid discussing politics, corruptions within the government, and Dominican life, without having a good understanding of the issues as well as the people with whom one is discussing it, and until one has established a relationship with the listener. These are touchy subjects to speak about, especially if one does not know what one is talking about.

Business Relationships

- Haitians expect to barter when making a purchase.
- Relationships are important to Haitians, so business discussions should be saved until the end of the meal, or for later.

== See also ==
- Etiquette
- Etiquette in Africa
- Etiquette in Latin America
