= Dutch customs and etiquette =

The Dutch have a code of etiquette which governs social behaviour and is considered important. Because of the international position of the Netherlands, many books have been written on the subject. Some customs may not be true in all regions and they are never absolute. In addition to those specific to the Dutch, many general points of European etiquette apply to the Dutch as well, as the Dutch generally view themselves as "taking the lead" in Europe but also part of it and the wider world as a whole.

== The people ==
The author Colleen Geske stated in her book Stuff Dutch People Like that "Dutch people consider the English or American forms of politeness a sign of weakness, and reeking of insincerity and hypocrisy. These are two traits Dutch people despise".

Research for Dutch world service radio concluded that just over half of the Dutch people living abroad consider their compatriots at home less well-mannered than other nationalities. In particular, waiters, teenagers and shop staff score badly. Some 55% of Dutch expats think the Dutch have become ruder since they left the country.

=== The Dutch and foreign languages ===
Addressing the Dutch in their native language may result in a reply in English. This phenomenon is humorously discussed in White and Boucke's The UnDutchables:

If you take a course in the Dutch language and finally progress enough to dare to utter some sentences in public, the persons you speak to will inevitably answer you in what they detect to be your native tongue. They love to show off the fact that they have learned one or more languages.

=== Humor ===
In the 16th century, the Dutch were renowned for their humor throughout Europe, and many travel journals have notes on the happy and celebratory nature of the Dutch. Farces and joke books were in demand and many Dutch painters chose to paint humorous paintings, Jan Steen being a good example.

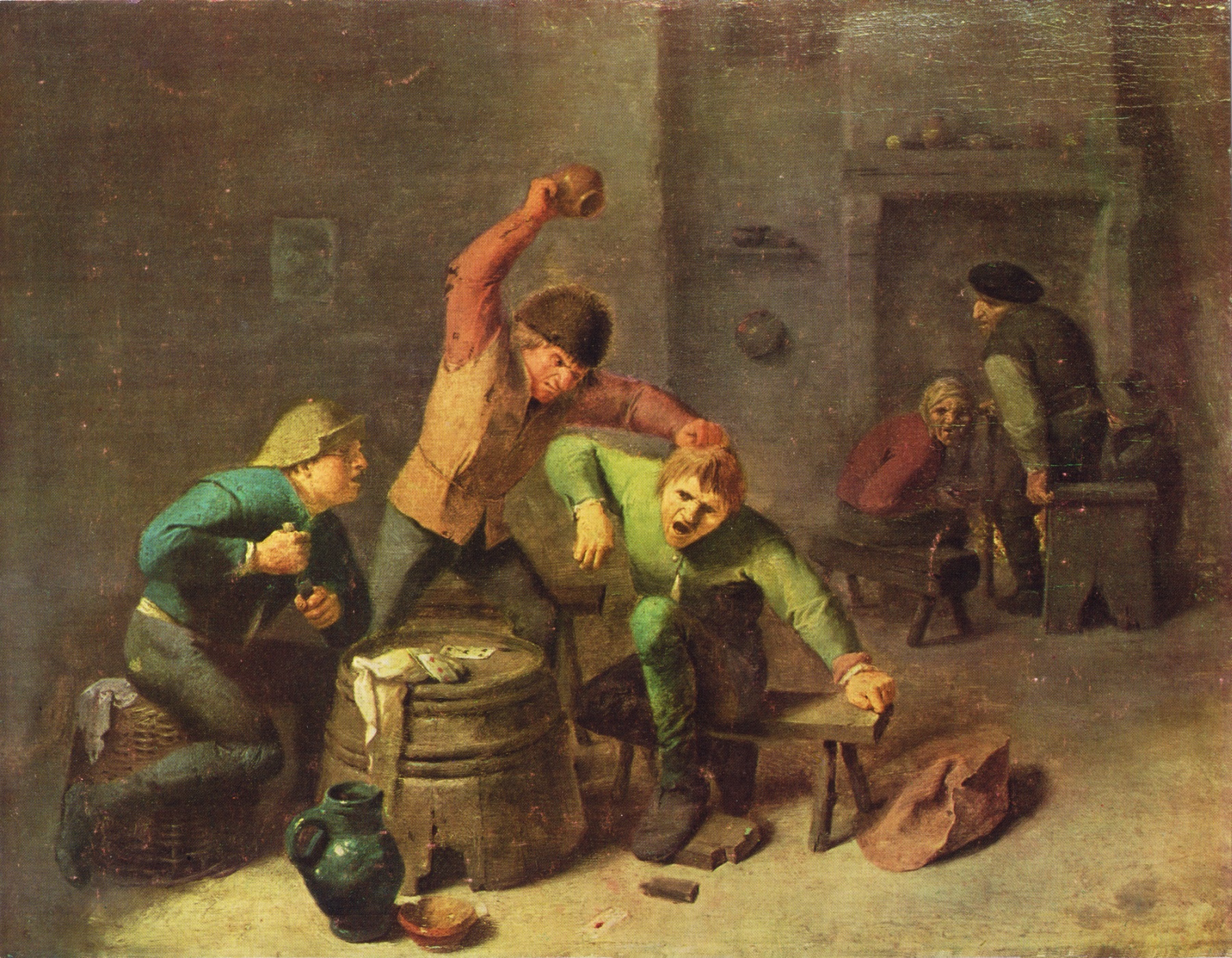
"Fighting peasants" by Adriaen Brouwer.

The main subjects of Dutch jokes at the time were deranged households, drunken clerics (mostly of the Roman Catholic Church) and people with mental and/or physical handicaps. A main theme was the reproof of immoral ethics: the 'Vicar's wagging finger'. However, at the end of the 17th century, the Dutch Republic was in decline, and the Dutch Reformed Church denounced laughter and advocated sober lifestyles. Etiquette manuals appeared which considered it impolite to laugh out loud. This continued into the 1960s: during World War II, American soldiers were instructed not to tell jokes to the Dutch as "they would not appreciate it".

== Miscellaneous ==
- The majority of the Dutch are irreligious and religion in the Netherlands is generally considered as a very personal matter which is not supposed to be propagated in public.
- In most matters, Dutch people tend to be straightforward and open, a tendency known as bespreekbaarheid.

== See also ==
- Etiquette in Europe
- Intercultural competence
- Dutch honours system
