= Stadsfries Dutch =

West Frisian dialect group

Stadsfries
- Town Frisian, City Frisian, city-Frisian
- Native to: Netherlands
- Native speakers: 45,000 (2009)
- Language family: Indo-European: Germanic; West Germanic; Weser–Rhine and North Sea Germanic; Low Franconian and Anglo-Frisian; Dutch and Frisian; Hollandic and West Frisian; Stadsfries
- Dialects: Midslands–Amelands; Het Bildt; Kollum; Stadsfries proper • Liwwarders (Leeuwarden) • Haagjes Fries (Heerenveen)
- Writing system: Latin

Language codes
- ISO 639-3: –
- Glottolog: town1239
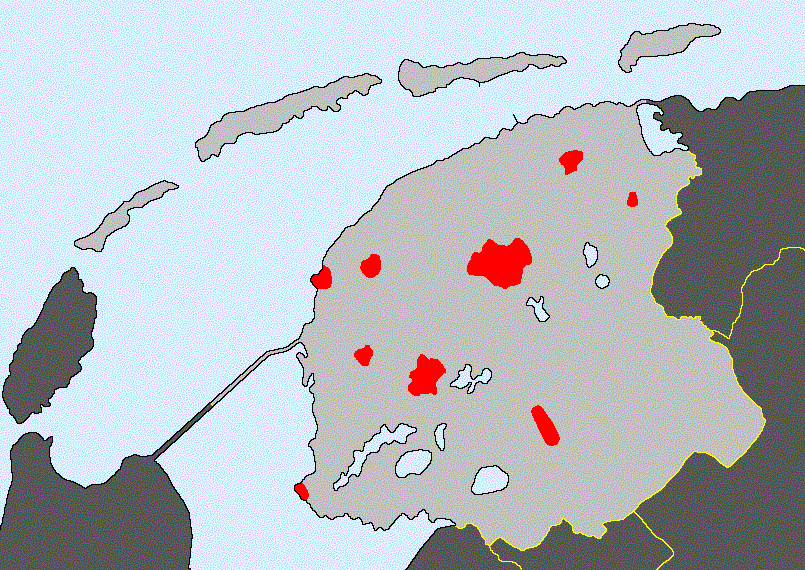
- Areas in which Stadsfries is spoken, within the area of Friesland

Stadsfries or Town Frisian (Dutch: Stadsfries, Stadfries; West Frisian: Stedsk, Stedfrysk) is a set of dialects spoken in certain cities in the province of Friesland in the northern Netherlands, namely Leeuwarden, Sneek, Bolsward, Franeker, Dokkum, Harlingen, Stavoren, and to some extent in Heerenveen. For linguistic reasons, the outlying and insular dialects of Midsland (Terschelling), Ameland, Het Bildt, and Kollum are also sometimes tied to Stadsfries.

The vocabulary of Stadsfries is derived primarily from Dutch. The dialects began in the late 15th century, when Frisia lost its political independence to the Netherlands. For many living in Frisia, learning Dutch became a necessity. The result was a mixture of Hollandic dialect vocabulary and West Frisian grammar and other language principles. Since this process began, the West Frisian language itself has evolved, such that Stadsfries is further away from modern Frisian than it is from Old Frisian. Norval Smith states that Stadsfries is a Frisian–Dutch mixed language.

The name of the dialect group, Stadsfries, is not an endonym but is instead a Dutch term for the language. Stad (German: Stadt) is a Germanic term for "city" or "town", seen in English place names such as "Hempstead". In Stadsfries, the term for the dialect group is Stadsfrys or Stads, or each dialect is known simply by a name derived from the particular city name, such as Liwwarders for the dialect of Leeuwarden. In West Frisian, the dialects are known as stedsk ("city-ish"), which does not indicate the idea that Stadsfries is a form of Frisian.

== History ==
Town Frisian is first attested in 1768 in a stage play called Vermaak de Slagtery by A. Jeltema.

== Vocabulary ==
The vocabulary of Stadsfries is mainly Dutch though the West Frisian language influence is notable. Furthermore, a set of word forms are used that are clearly West Frisian, not Dutch. Examples:

Stadsfries	West Frisian	Dutch	English
hammer	hammer	hamer	hammer
joeke	jûkje	jeuken	itching

The language also has typical West Frisian words that do not exist (in that sense) in Dutch, usually this concerns domestic words and words from the mainly West Frisian language agricultural sector. Examples:

Stadsfries	West Frisian	Dutch	English
moeke	mem	moeder	mother
fader	heit	vader	father
jaar	jaar	uier	udder
jarre	jarre	gier	manure

Other differences between Dutch and West Frisian can be traced back to the Dutch dialect of the 16th century. Example:

Stadsfries	West Frisian	Dutch	English
lêge	lizze	liggen	lie down

Finally, several words have survived in the Stadsfries language due to Dutch influence that have since disappeared from the West Frisian language. Examples:

Stadsfries	West Frisian	Dutch	English
kyn	bern	kind	child
fierndeel	fearn	een vierde (deel)	one fourth (as in division) (mainly U.S.); one quarter

== Grammar ==
Stadsfries aligns with West Frisian, rather than prescriptive Standard Dutch in the usage of the voiceless /f/ and /s/, rather than the voiced /v/ and /z/ in the word-initial position. However, the devoicing of the initial /v/ is now considered standard in the Netherlands, contrary to the devoicing of /z/. Another Frisian feature of Stadsfries is that the word-initial sequence /sx/, found in standard Dutch, is replaced with /sk/, with a velar plosive. Stadsfries has these properties in common with West Frisian, as well as several Dutch dialects.

The plurals match West Frisian (skip-skippen), as do the diminutives (popke, autootsje, rinkje), except those in Stavers (poppy, autootsy, rinkje), where Hollands rules are followed.

The verbs are missing two West Frisian weak classes, but do use West Frisian rules for forming past participles: they never get the affix ge- (ik hew maakt; hest dou dat sien?). Stadsfrisian kept the West Frisian pronouns do, jo and jimme (informal you, formal you, plural you), although do and jo are almost always written as dou and jou. These words can in fact be used as criteria for deciding whether a Hollandic-West Frisian mixed dialect can still be considered Stadsfries. The Dutch dialect called "West Frisian" spoken in the West Friesland region of North Holland for example does not have these words and is therefore considered Hollandic.

== Spelling ==
There is no standardized, officially recognized spelling for Stadsfries. The very few authors that write in it each use their own spelling conventions. The most commonly used spelling is that in the Woordenboek fan ut Liwwarders (Leeuwarden Dictionary). This spelling convention is closely related to, but more phonetic than West Frisian, and does not use the letter û.

== Speakers ==
The use of Stadsfries is declining rapidly, especially in Leeuwarden. No more than a quarter of the city's population (approximately 20,000 people) speaks the language, although that percentage is higher in smaller towns. In the first half of the twentieth century the town of Heerenveen had a local strand of Stadsfries known as Haagjes Fries, spoken especially around Oranjewoud, near the country home of the Frisian stadhouder.

Use of most dialects (as well as the West Frisian language) is declining, but because West Frisian is considered prestigious and even recognized as a Dutch national language, Stadsfries has become a sociolect of the lower classes, especially in the cities. The transition from dialect to sociolect happened primarily in the 20th century. Around 1900, the Stadsfries dialects were still considered regional strands of Dutch and given a much higher status than Frisian. With the rise of Standard Dutch in society's upper classes, brought on particularly by education and mass media, Stadsfries stopped being considered a strand of Dutch. Since the lower classes had less exposure to Standard Dutch, they remained as some of the only speakers of Stadsfries.
