= Etiquette in Europe =

Etiquette in Europe is not uniform. Even within the regions of Europe, etiquette may not be uniform: within a single country there may be differences in customs, especially where there are different linguistic groups, as in Switzerland where there are French, German and Italian speakers.

Despite this heterogeneity, many points of etiquette have spread through Europe and many features are shared. The ancient Roman Empire is a historical source, and the cosmopolitan royalty and also nobility were effective in spreading etiquette throughout Europe. For example, in the Palace of Versailles, where French nobility was concentrated, a complicated etiquette was developed.

== Language and forms of address ==
It is never acceptable to write an anonymous letter or one that purports to be signed by somebody other than the writer (but does not make that clear).

Many languages use different 2nd person pronouns to denote formality or familiarity when addressing people (the T–V distinction). This also applies in common phrases such as "How are you?". The use of an inappropriately familiar form may be seen as derogatory, insulting or even aggressive. Conversely, forms that are inappropriately formal may be seen as impolitely snobbish or distant.

The way politeness is expressed varies greatly with language and region. For example, addressing a person with an honorific or title may be expected in some languages, but seen as intrusive or too formal in others.

In many parts of Europe, using someone's first name also denotes a certain level of friendship. In social interactions with strangers, the last name and/or more formal mode of address is used, usually until the people involved agree to move to an informal level. However, this may not apply among young people, among members of particular groups (e.g. students) or in informal settings. Also among countries that border each other vast differences can be noticed in the use of titles, first names and pronouns, as is the case in the Netherlands compared with Belgium and Germany.

== Flowers ==
In some countries, such as in Italy, chrysanthemums are given only at funerals. In France, red roses are given to the beloved person when the giver is in love. In Finland, the same applies except that school leavers are often given red roses on passing their matriculation examination (abitur).

== Hats, sunglasses and coats ==
Among many segments of the European population, for example, in the United Kingdom, it is often considered impolite to wear a hat, other head covering or sunglasses indoors (except for religious or medical reasons, such as light sensitivity), especially in churches, schools, private homes and respected public institutions. In churches, however, ladies are exempt from this rule. Formerly, female head covering was mandatory in church.

Wearing coats, boots or other outer garments inside someone's home is often frowned upon as well. Sitting down to eat at table wearing a hat or coat etc. is even worse. Also one should remove one's hat when showing deference. Removing one's hat is also a form of respectful greeting: the origin of this is that knights were expected to remove their helmets when meeting their king; not doing so would be a sign of mistrust and hostility. It has been reduced to a hat tip.

== Money ==
Talking or asking about one's personal wealth, possessions or success in business is widely viewed as vulgar. People will rarely say how much money they make or have in the bank nor will they request such information from someone else. It is impolite to ask colleagues about their salary and in some places of work it is forbidden. Even elsewhere, for example where government employees' salaries are publicly known, it is still considered extremely rude to ask individuals how much they earn.

== Exposure ==
In Europe, what qualifies as indecent exposure includes generally at least the exposure of genitalia or anus. In case of women, exposing nipples is not seen as proper conduct, but this is not always considered criminal, and depends on individual countries' nudity laws. For the issue of breastfeeding babies in public, see Breastfeeding in public. The intentional exposure of bare buttocks towards someone, mooning, is a deliberate insult. However, public nudity may be allowed in some circumstances, which vary by country. Within Dutch society nudity is less sexualized as in for example the English-speaking world and resembles more the views of other Northern European cultures, as can be seen in the sauna customs. In saunas, the rules about nudity vary according to the country. On nudist beaches, unisex saunas and in the changing rooms of swimming pools in some countries, keeping one's clothes on is frowned upon. Here it is good manners to undress.

== See also ==
- Dutch customs and etiquette
- Etiquette in Africa
- Etiquette in Asia
- Etiquette in Australia and New Zealand
- Etiquette in Canada and the United States
- Etiquette in Japan
- Etiquette in Latin America
- Etiquette in the Middle East
