= English language in the Netherlands =

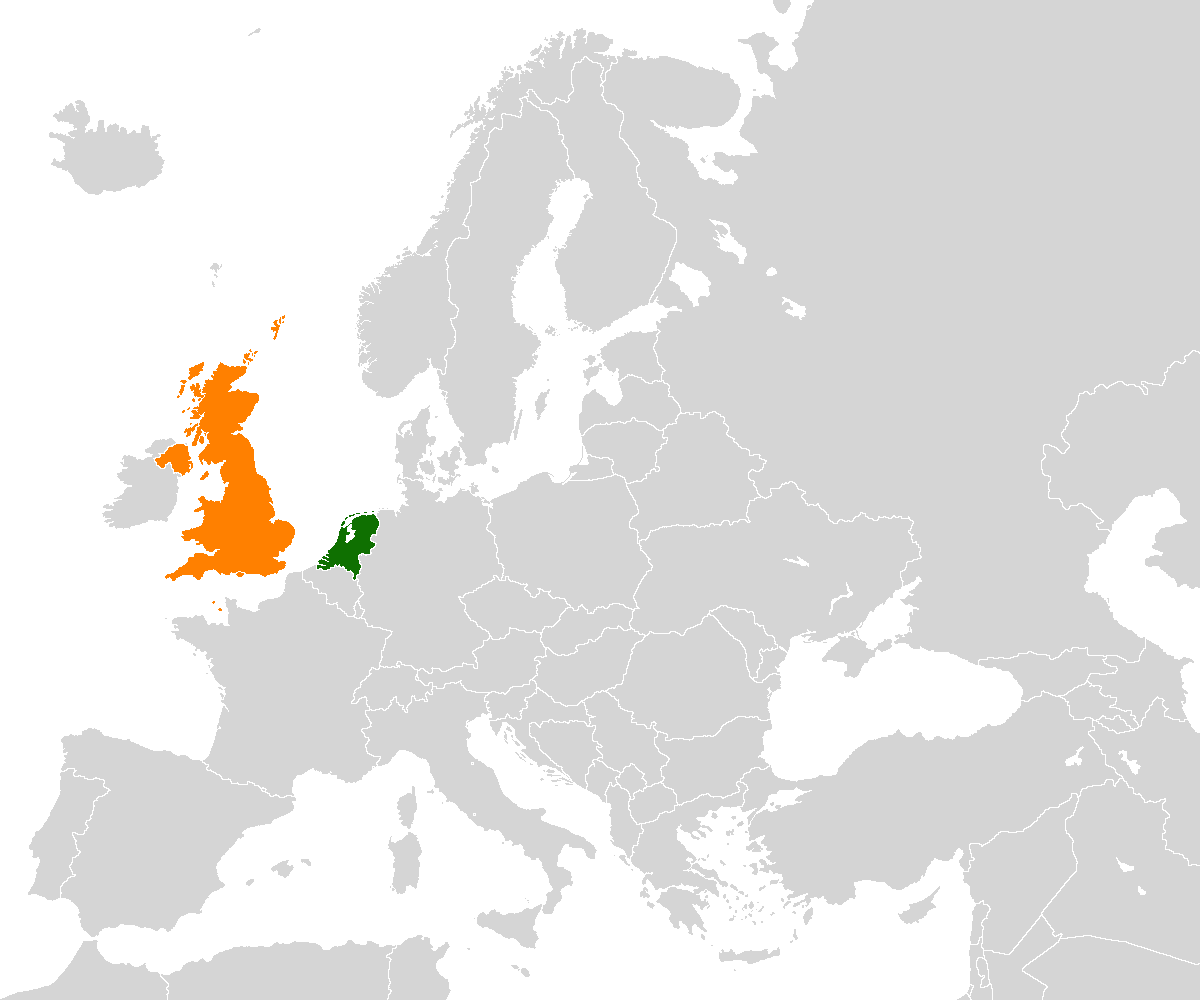
The United Kingdom (orange) and the Netherlands (green). The cultural relationship between the two countries dates back centuries.

In the Netherlands, the English language can be spoken by the vast majority of the population, with estimates of English proficiency reaching 90% to 96% of the Dutch population. Contributing factors for the high degree of English fluency are the similarity of the two languages, the country's small size, dependence on international trade, and the use of subtitles for foreign languages on television, rather than audio dubbing. Dutch children have to start learning English in primary school from age ten at the latest. Additionally, more and more Dutch schools, at all levels of education, have adopted English as a language to teach in.

Dutch's genealogical proximity to English is also noted as a significant factor since both languages share a closely related West Germanic language origin. Occupations that require advanced knowledge of English, such as those in aviation and the sciences, are above averagely chosen in the Netherlands. Furthermore, it is an official and the majority language in the Caribbean municipalities of Saba and Sint Eustatius.

Culturally, the Dutch have a long tradition of foreign language learning. The focus of modern foreign language (MFL) learning in school lies on English, German and/or French. Despite an ever stronger focus on English, learning two or even three foreign languages is still not unusual. For instance, 31% of the Dutch also claim to speak German well enough to have a conversation in it.

== History ==
Various explanations contribute to the popularity of English in the Netherlands. The small size and population of the Netherlands and hundreds of years of it having a trade and commerce economy, particularly between Continental Europe and the United Kingdom, the Dutch put strong emphasis on learning English and other foreign languages, especially French and German. In the following decades, with American-dominated globalization, English gradually increased in importance as a lingua franca, at the expense of both German and French, which lost popularity as second languages in the latter half of the 20th century. That is in spite of Germany being the most important trade partner of the Netherlands. Nevertheless, knowledge of more than one foreign language is still more widespread than in many other member states of the European Union.

Visitors may find that it is possible to live in the Netherlands for a long time without learning Dutch. A substantial number of the inhabitants of Amsterdam have English as their native language, mostly British and North American immigrants. Nevertheless, in and around Amsterdam, one may find announcements, traffic signs and advertisements in both Dutch and English or even in English only, as in Schiphol Airport. Amsterdam, however, already has had an English-speaking community for hundreds of years. A church worshipping in English, the English Reformed Church was reopened for worship in 1607.

Most important scholarly and scientific publications in the Netherlands are now in English with the exception of government and legal publications.

== English-language education in the Netherlands ==
English is compulsory at all levels of the Dutch secondary education system:

- Many elementary schools teach English in the upper grades.
- Pupils must score at least a 5.5/10 for English Language and Literature at the high school finals to be able to graduate, which equals to a A2 level at the lowest (At VMBO high school level), and a B2 to C1 level at the highest (At VWO high school level).

The official goal is for pupils to learn Received Pronunciation, or the King's English. However, the availability of American English-television, as well as British English television programmes that are freely available without audio dubbing has resulted in Dutch pupils speaking and writing a mix of these major influences.

Since secondary schools in the Netherlands have different levels of education (preparatory mid-level professional, higher general continued education and pre-university college/preparatory scientific education), a test from the elementary school and the advice of the teacher determines the level that a pupil will attend. The first teaches a pupil enough English to have simple conversations.

The second is focused on achieving the ability to speak formally and in a professional setting. The third is focused on understanding the more difficult texts and communicating on a university/scientific level, which is a bit more than a master in English needed for British universities demands but without the proverbs or sayings.

- Around 100 schools offer bilingual education (Dutch-English). The concept was first introduced in several secondary schools, but it has found its way to elementary schools.
- The first university professor of English, Jan Beckering Vinckers, was appointed at the University of Groningen in 1885.
- Most university master's degrees are in English, and an increasing number of bachelor's degrees are as well, and even the first degrees of community college given in English have made their way into existence. In addition, many degrees that are taught in Dutch use English-language materials (such as books) and names.
- Students are often taught to perform internet searches in English, which allow for far more types and amounts of information than in Dutch.

== English-language television in the Netherlands ==
In addition to the availability of the British channels BBC One, Two and World News and the American CNN, many programmes broadcast on Dutch channels are broadcast in their original English language with Dutch subtitles. English language children's programmes, however, are usually dubbed. Dubbed commercials, films and television programmes, apart from animations and cartoons, have often come to be disliked by the Dutch public. People very much prefer them to be broadcast with subtitles or even with no form of translation at all.

There are also a few television stations broadcasting in English, which target the English-speaking community of the Netherlands, such as AF-TV, or dedicate large portions of airtime to programming in English, such as RTV7 and Amsterdam local TV channel Salto 1. (See also Television in the Netherlands)

== Dunglish ==
Dunglish (called steenkolenengels in Dutch translating to coal English) is a portmanteau of Dutch and English and a term often used pejoratively to refer to the mistakes native Dutch speakers make when speaking English.

== See also ==
- Languages of the Netherlands
- The UnDutchables
