= Etiquette in Australia and New Zealand =

Expectations regarding good manners differ from person to person and vary according to each situation. As the perception of behaviours and actions vary, intercultural competence is essential. However, a lack of knowledge about the customs and expectations of people in Australia and New Zealand can make even the best intentioned person seem ignorant, inconsiderate or even rude. Given the historic roots, it is very similar to British culture, specifically the United Kingdom, terms such as ‘fanny’ as well as the emphasis on politeness in queuing are observed in both cultures.

== Shared expectations ==
Australia and New Zealand are separate countries, each with its own distinct national identity that includes particular customs and rules of etiquette. While, to outsiders, these cultures can seem very similar, confusing their identities in general conversation is usually not tolerated and will be quickly corrected. Points of etiquette that apply to both countries include the following:

=== Language ===
- Requesting a fanny pack can be considered obscene due to the use of "fanny" as a slang term for female genitalia. "Bum bag" is the acceptable local variation in some areas. Australians and New Zealanders are generally tolerant and forgiving of American and Canadian tourists and foreigners making this mistake and may joke about the use of this term, but will understand both.
- An enquiry about a person's well-being (such as "How's it going?", "How are you going?" or "How are ya?") is a common greeting. Generally the accepted response is non-negative; "Good thanks", "Not (too) bad" or "Pretty good, mate", and it is considered polite to ask the person the same question back. It is considered polite to greet anyone including strangers, in this way. It is considered impolite, or awkward to answer this question with an honest dissertation on how one actually feels, particularly if the respondent wishes to answer in the negative. The question is generally considered an ice breaker and nothing more.
- Bragging/Boasting (called 'skiting' by some New Zealanders), or initiating discussion of one's own achievements, is usually considered in poor taste. (See tall poppy syndrome.)
- It is acceptable to host a barbecue without supplying all the food and drink. The host may ask guests to bring particular items such as beverages, salad, or meat, often using the initialism "BYO" (Bring your own)
- The term "bring a plate" is synonymous with "potluck"

=== Public places ===
- As cars drive on the left side of the road in both countries, people moving forward will generally go to the left as well. When walking on the pavement (usually called the 'footpath'), one should walk on the left, whenever possible. When travelling on escalators or moving walkways, one should keep to the left when standing, or keep to the right when walking. It is expected that walkers will consider people around them (and not just before them) when joining a walkway.
- Both Australians and New Zealanders assume a large sense of personal space around them. Intrusion of this space in public can be met with confusion or even anger. Even prior to COVID-19, it was and still is considered extremely rude to stand too close, push or brush up in passing against someone they do not know well.
- Queuing (getting in line/forming a line) is expected when there is any demand for an item or when waiting to board public transport, and is considered basic manners. Queues are formed on a "first come, first served" line basis. The only exception to this is a pub where people will normally lean on the bar to wait but one should be aware of who is waiting ahead of them because it is considered rude to accept service from a barman before someone who has been waiting longer. A simple nod or subtle gesture towards the person who has waited longer will be understood by any experienced server to mean that the indicated person was before them. It is considered acceptable for a person facing greater-than-normal difficulty (e.g., elderly, pregnant, using a cane/walking frame/wheelchair, carrying a baby, minding very young children) to ask "Do you mind?" and then others will usually allow them to "jump the queue"; it would be considered rude in that case to refuse. A person who is not obviously in this situation may ask others to allow them to cut in on the basis of urgency (e.g., "Do you mind? I have to catch a bus in 5 minutes", etc.) but in that case it is also acceptable for others to decline or to ignore the request.
- Spitting in the street or on the footpath, or dropping rubbish while walking is considered to be bad manners.
- Speaking loudly in public places is also generally frowned upon, especially at a higher volume level than others in the same area, e.g. on public transport, walking down the street or in a restaurant.

=== Bars and restaurants ===
- When paying a cashier, it is usual to gently place the money in their hand, demonstrated as an offering rather than forced on the recipient. Similarly, change is usually placed in the recipient's hand in return. Snatching money out of a person's hand is considered very bad manners.
- Tipping is not expected and some employees may not understand the gesture and return the money. Some employees are forbidden from accepting gratuities (this is mainly in positions of authority e.g. in a casino one generally cannot tip the dealer or a security guard however, this would not apply in a formal restaurant situation) and tipping face-to-face can create an awkward situation. However, one may like to add a tip to restaurant bills of (generally) no more than 10% if the service has been especially good. It is also acceptable to suggest that taxi drivers or waiters "keep the change", especially if the difference is small. Tips may be as large or as small as the tipper feel appropriate, but rarely exceed 10%. Where tip jars are provided, they are mostly used for loose change or coins. Included 'service charges', established by the business's owners or managers are rare.
- When out with friends, co-workers or relatives, it is common but not compulsory for people to take turns buying rounds of drinks. This is referred to as a 'shout', e.g. "It's my shout". There is a more minor expectation that the recipient of a 'shout' will repay the favour by paying for the next round of drinks
- A person who takes the last item of food from a common plate, without first offering it to the others at the table may be seen as greedy or inconsiderate. If someone does want more food in this situation and the remaining portion can be split, proposing to halve it is common.
- One is expected to treat people serving them as politely as they expect them to be treated, as both cultures perceive themselves as highly egalitarian - to an extent far more than US culture. 'Please' is generally used when placing an order or making a request and 'thank you' when the order or service is received. 'I want', 'Give me' or 'I'll take' are considered inappropriate phrases to use when ordering food. 'Could I please have' or 'May I have' are considered far more appropriate phrases to use with staff providing food or any other kind of service.
- Complaints in restaurants are rare. Most customers will merely refuse to revisit an establishment after bad food or service.
- Surcharges for use of less commonly used credit cards such as Diners Club and Amex commonly apply in many New Zealand and Australian establishments. To avoid conflict most establishments will advertise this with a sign of some sort near the cashier area, and signage will normally indicate if such cards are accepted for payment.
- Arguing or yelling with staff in any establishment is considered very rude and inappropriate. 'Making a scene' regardless of the quality of the service is considered very poor form (i.e. culturally unacceptable). Both cultures consider that 'not coming back' to an establishment (and possibly bad mouthing in private) adequate punishment for poor service.
- Common restaurant manners include using the knife and fork properly (fork left, knife right only), refraining from burping and placing elbows on a table, placing one's napkin on their lap and leaving it folded on the table after use, and eating neatly. Chewing open-mouthed (including chewing gum), slurping loudly, burping and talking with a full mouth are considered very rude. If a person does any of these things accidentally, they are expected to say "pardon me" or "excuse me."
- It is considered bad manners to pick one's teeth with the fingers or a toothpick in public. If toothpicks are offered in a restaurant after a meal, is it considered polite to cover the mouth while using the toothpick.

=== Driving ===
- Waving as a gesture of thanks to drivers that stop to allow one into their lane, exit a driveway, merging into the lane, or cross at a crossing, is viewed as polite. Not doing so is considered rude, even if mildly so.
- When driving between towns and cities it is considered rude to speed up if one is in the left lane of a road with a passing lane. They should allow cars in the right lane to overtake slower traffic without needing to increase their speed excessively. After overtaking, cars are expected to revert back to the left (slower) lane. It is important to keep left if not overtaking other traffic, and allow other faster traffic to overtake in the passing (right) lane.

== Australia ==
=== General ===
- Although 70% of the population has some Anglo-Celtic ancestry, there is acknowledgement of the country's growing ethnic/racial diversity, and the traditional indigenous peoples.
- Making jokes at another's expense or "taking the piss" is common in Australian society and is often a bonding process. However, it is frowned upon and considered cowardly to make jokes in the absence of the subject. Contrary to many other countries, Australians will generally wait until the subject is present before making derogatory jokes.

=== Language ===
- "Indigenous Australian" and "Aboriginal person/Torres Strait Islander" are polite terms, also regional/state preferences such as "Koori" are also acceptable as long the person in question and the speaker both consider each other friends. Aboriginal refers to Indigenous people from the mainland and Tasmania, the Torres Strait Islanders are a separate ethnic group with their own cultural traditions. "Abo", "Coon", "Gin" and "Boong" or "Boonga" are all considered offensive and unacceptable in formal conversation when describing Aboriginal Australians, and are similar to the use of the N-word in the USA describing African Americans. One may hear slang terms for indigenous Australians sometimes being used in casual conversations, but only when the participant is of Indigenous descent, and this is controversial and often frowned upon. "Aboriginal" is now used only as an adjective, although older documents may still use it as a noun (e.g. "Aboriginals"). Note that the words "Coon" and "Gin" are not always considered offensive in other contexts - the former being the former name of a popular brand of cheese and the latter a common drink. The politest option is to simply avoid the issue of race, or ask the person how they would like to be referred to.
- State/ regional preferences for specific names for groups of Indigenous Australians have also arisen in recent years: The term Koori (or Koorie) in New South Wales or Victoria. Those from Queensland use the term Murri (pronounced the same as "Murray"). Nunga is used in most of South Australia. Noongar is used in southern Western Australia. Anangu is used in northern South Australia, and neighbouring parts of Western Australia and the Northern Territory. Palawah is used in Tasmania. However, there were over 200 different languages at the time of European settlement, which means these terms are very specific.

=== Ethnic issues ===
- In the UK, the term "Paki" is considered racially offensive; however, the word also evolved in parallel in Australia as a shortened form of "Pakistani", similar to the shortening of "Australian" to "Aussie". Usually used in a cricketing context, in Australian usage the word refers specifically and solely to people who are Pakistani and carries no derogatory intent, being a term of affection.

== New Zealand ==
=== Māori ===
- Correct pronunciation of Māori words and placenames, and the word "Māori" itself, is often important to Māori, although usually less so to non-Māori.
- It is incorrect to pluralise "Māori" and loan words from Māori by adding an "s". There is no letter "s" in the Māori language, and plurality is indicated by the articles (te/ngā/ngāti) appearing before the word rather than a word ending.
- Sitting on or resting one's backside against a table or desk can offend Māori and in turn New Zealanders as a whole. A table is where food is served and should not be touched by the "unclean" regions. Similarly, one should not sit on a pillow; the head is tapu (sacred), and pillows are for resting heads only.
- Shoes should always be removed before entering the wharenui (meeting house) on a marae. Never eat inside a meeting house – the building is regarded as tapu (sacred).

== See also ==
- Modern Etiquette
- Etiquette in Africa
- Etiquette in Asia
- Etiquette in Canada and the United States
- Etiquette in Europe
- Etiquette in Latin America
- Etiquette in the Middle East
- Worldwide etiquette
- Avoidance speech
