= Etiquette in Asia =

Social customs

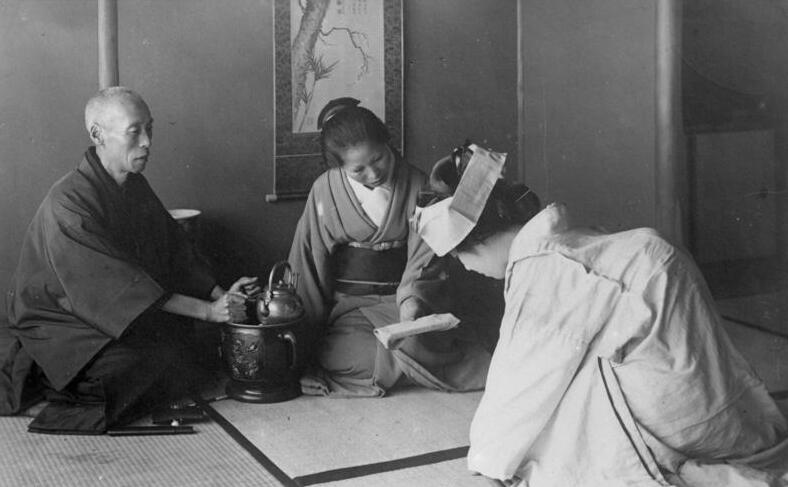
In Asia, paying respect to elders is expected among younger people, a gesture such as bowing expresses the utmost respect. The elaborate and refined Japanese tea ceremony is also meant to demonstrate respect through grace and good etiquette.

Etiquette in Asia varies from country to country even though certain actions may seem to be common. No article on the rules of etiquette, nor any list of faux pas, can ever be complete. As the perception of behaviors and actions vary, intercultural competence is essential. A lack of knowledge about the customs and expectations of Asian people can make even those with good intentions seem rude, foolish, and disrespectful.

Asian etiquette is often manifested with shades of "respect", "good manners" and "filial", and is highly influenced by Chinese culture.

== Bangladesh ==
Bangladeshi society is reserved and very structured. While the norms change or vary, there are timeless customs such as respect for the elders and high regard for family. People always treat elders with deference, and it's considered rude for a young person to be direct and opinionated when speaking to them. Even prolonged eye contact with a senior is considered bad manners.

Bangladeshis are modest people and it is not recommended to give excessive praise and can be interpreted as insincere and offensive. Religion serves as a strong influence on etiquette. It is not acceptable for a man to shake hands with a woman if the latter did not offer a hand first. Along with social categorization, religion dictates what is allowed and prohibited.

When it comes to business, the etiquette is similar to those found in other Asian countries such as not being direct when communicating one's position or ideas.

== Brunei ==
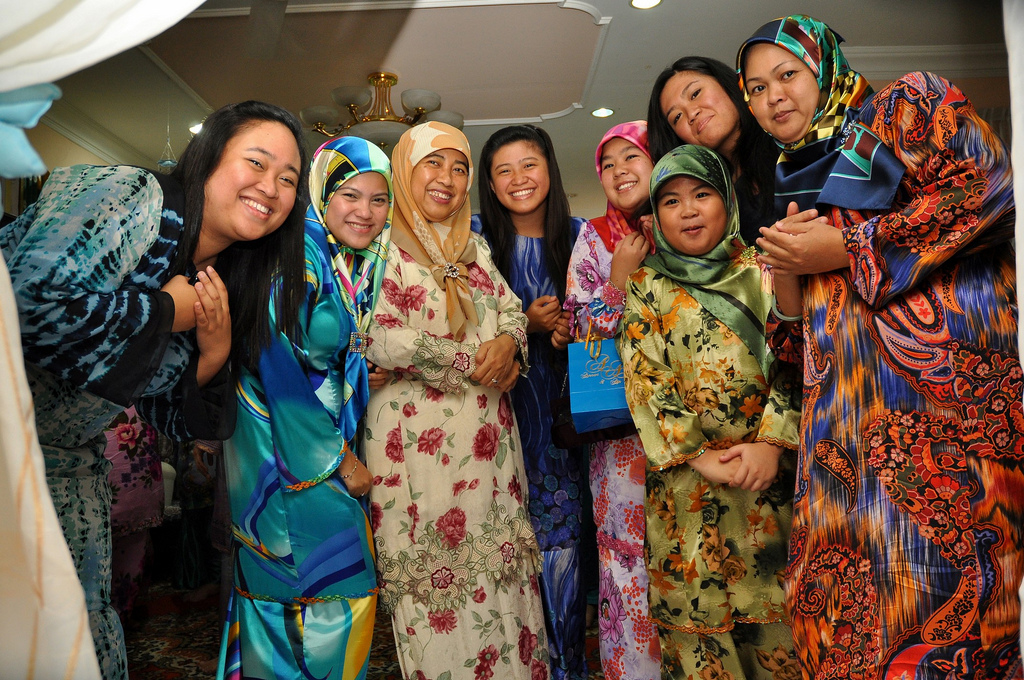
Southeast Asians are very family-oriented and celebrations are a chance to meet extended kinsmen. In Islamic culture, modesty in dress etiquette is important, such as the tudong (hijab).

Etiquette in Brunei is similar to that of Malaysia.

== China ==
Eating is a dominant aspect of Chinese culture and eating out is one of the most common ways to honour guests, socialize, and deepen friendships. Generally, Chinese etiquette is very similar to that in other East Asian countries such as Korea and Japan, with some exceptions. In most traditional Chinese dining, dishes are shared communally. Although both square and rectangular tables are used for small groups of people, round tables are preferred for large groups. There is a specific seating order to every formal dinner, based on seniority and organizational hierarchy. The seat of honour, reserved for the host or oldest person, is usually the one in the center facing east or facing the entrance. Chopsticks are used instead of forks and knives. In most Chinese restaurants, there is no tip required unless it is explicitly posted. Tea is almost always provided, either in advance of the diners being seated or immediately afterward. A verbal "thank you" (谢谢; xiexie) should be offered to the server pouring the tea.

=== Handshake etiquette ===
The order of handshakes is mainly determined by the principle of "the elder comes first". In formal occasions, the order of extending hands when shaking hands is mainly determined by position and identity. In general occasions, it is mainly determined by age, gender, and marital status.

1. When a person of higher position shakes hands with a person of lower position, the person of higher position should extend his hand first.
2. When a lady shakes hands with a man, the lady should extend her hand first.
3. When an elder shakes hands with a younger person, the elder should extend his hand first.
4. When a married person shakes hands with an unmarried person, the married person should extend his hand first.
5. When a teacher shakes hands with a student, the teacher should extend his hand first.
6. When the first person to arrive shakes hands with the last person in a social occasion, the first person to arrive should extend his hand first.
7. When the host entertains guests, he should extend his hand first to shake hands with the visiting guest; when the guest leaves, the guest should extend his hand first.

=== Bowing etiquette ===
Bowing in China was originally a sacrificial ritual that was formed during the Shang Dynasty. After the Xinhai Revolution abolished the kneeling ritual, bowing became the most equal social etiquette. At that time, people believed that bending the sacrifices such as cattle and sheep into a bow shape on the altar was the only way to express respect and piety to the heaven. Later generations interpreted it as a daily etiquette, bending over, lowering the head, avoiding the other person's sight, to show obedience and lack of hostility. Now we can see that bowing has become a common etiquette for greeting people, showing respect, gratitude, and apology. When bowing, be careful not to be disrespectful. For example, do not take off your hat, talk while bowing, or even laugh, look around, eat, put one hand in your pocket, etc. When bowing, avoid the recipient's line of sight, which is the key to showing respect and obedience. When trying to look at the other person's face, you will have to raise your head, tilt your head, roll your eyes up, and make the bow look funny, which is a serious disrespect for the other person. When you should bow, nodding and bowing is a disrespectful expression of the recipient.

=== Chinese table manners ===
The seating rule is that if it is a round table, the person facing the door is the host and guest, and the left and right positions of the host and guest are determined by the distance between the host and guest. The closer the host and guest are, the more respected they are. At the same distance, the left side is more respected than the right side. The host should arrive early, wait at the door, and guide guests to their seats. Invitees will be seated as arranged by the host.

Don't stick your chopsticks straight into the bowl when eating, as this will look like burning incense. Be sure to put down your chopsticks when drinking soup. Never hold a spoon and chopsticks in your hands at the same time, otherwise it is very impolite. When picking up food, do not use chopsticks to stir inside the food; do not place chopsticks on the bowl after eating.

=== Ancient Chinese sacrificial rituals ===
Sacrifice is a ritual with a long history. It is called the auspicious ritual in the ancient Chinese ritual system and ranks first among the five rituals. There were many objects of sacrifice in ancient China, among which the three most basic elements were heaven, earth, and human beings. Later, it evolved into the ritual of three sacrifices: offering sacrifices to heaven and earth, offering sacrifices to ancestors, and offering sacrifices to sages. Qingming Festival is the most extensive ceremony to worship ancestors and has profound cultural connotations.

Today's sacrifices are commonly known as tomb sweeping, which is a sacrificial activity for deceased relatives. According to traditional customs, when sweeping the tomb, people should bring wine, food, fruits, paper money and other items to the cemetery, offer the food in front of the tomb of their relatives, burn the paper money, cover the tomb with new soil, break a few new green branches and insert them on the tomb. Then he kowtows and worships, and finally goes home after eating wine and food.

=== Congratulation etiquette ===
It is generally used during festivals as a way of showing respect to the elders from younger generations or people with lower status, and is also used to congratulate each other among peers. When giving congratulatory gifts, you should not only have a respectful attitude and read congratulatory messages, but also give congratulatory gifts.

== India ==
Etiquette in India shares many similarities with its South and Southeast Asian neighbours, however, there are exceptions found throughout the country.

== Indonesia ==
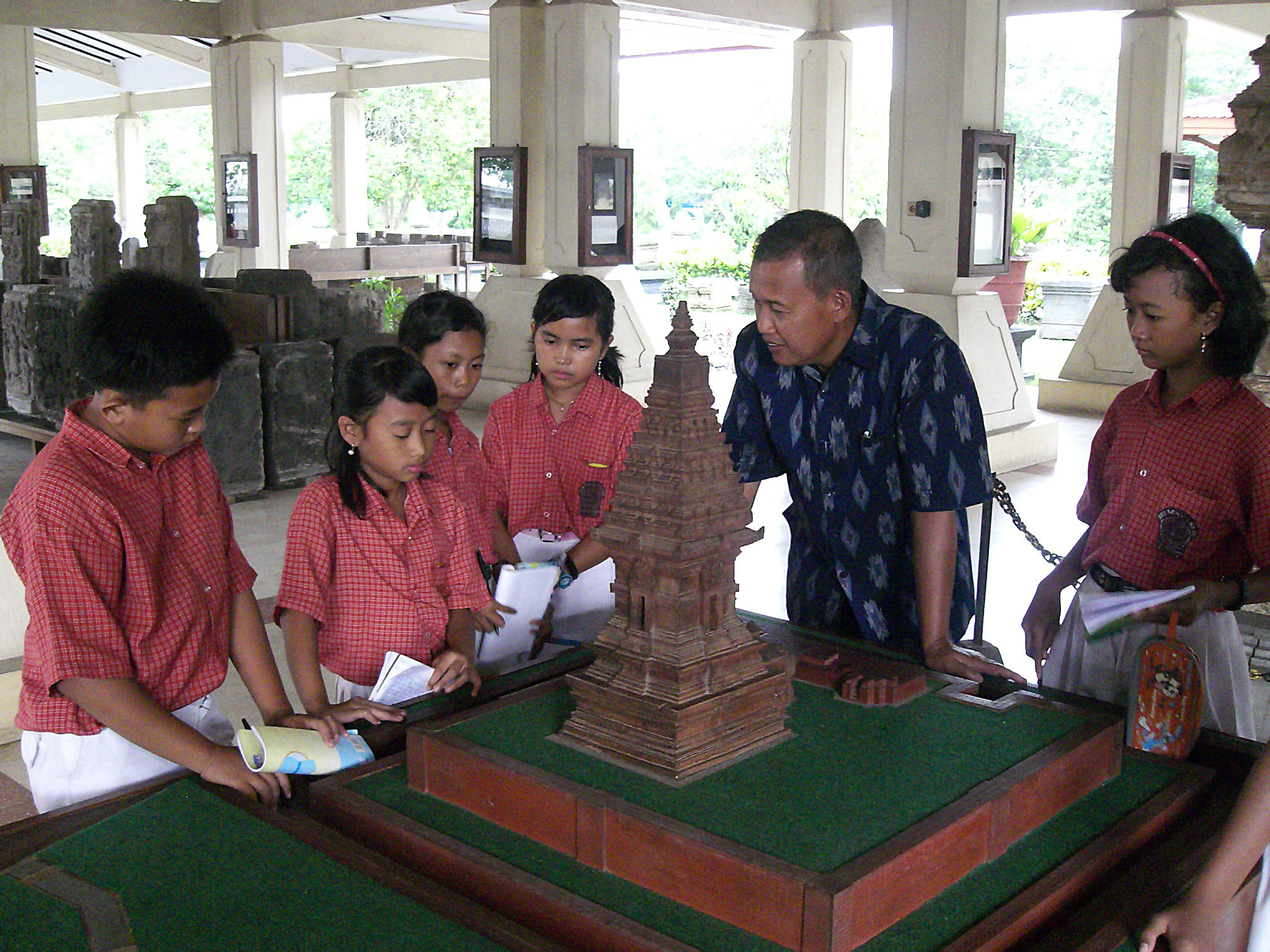
Paying respect to elders and obeying teachers are expected among Asian youth, such as shown here in Indonesia. The students quietly listen to their teacher's explanation during their school excursion.

It is important to understand that Indonesia is a vast tropical country of sprawling archipelago with extremely diverse culture. Each of these Indonesian ethnic groups has its own culture, tradition and may speak its own language. Each of them may adhere to different religions that have their own rules. These combinations made Indonesia a complex mixture of traditions that may differ from one place to another. Indonesia shares many of the points of etiquette with other Southeast Asian nations. As Indonesia has a Muslim majority population, some points of etiquette in the Middle East also apply. Following are some key points of Indonesian etiquette:

It is important to be considerate of other people's dignity. Shaming or humiliating people in public is considered extremely rude.

One should always use their right hand when shaking hands, offering a gift, handing or receiving something, eating, pointing or generally touching another person.

== Japan ==
Japanese customs and etiquette can be especially complex and demanding. The knowledge that non-Japanese who commit faux pas act from inexperience can fail to offset the negative emotional response some Japanese people feel when their expectations in matters of etiquette are not met.

- Business cards should be given and accepted with both hands. It is expected that the cards will immediately be inspected and admired, then placed on the table in front of the receiver for the duration of the meeting. After the meeting, cards should be stored respectfully and should never be placed in a back pocket. Business cards should not be written on. To be taken seriously at a business meeting, one must have business cards. When taken out, they should be in a cardholder – not a pocket.
- It is a faux pas to accept a gift when it is first offered and the giver is expected to offer it multiple times (usually 3 times). Gifts are generally not opened in the giver's presence.
- In greeting or thanking another person, it may be insulting if the person of lower status does not bow appropriately lower than the other person. However, foreigners are rarely expected to bow. The level and duration of the bow depends on status, age, and other factors.
- Pouring soy sauce onto rice is considered unusual.
- It is less common to pour one's own drink in a social setting. Generally, an individual will offer to pour a companion's drink and the companion, in return, will pour the individual's drink. Although if one person is drinking from a bottle to glass and the other one is drinking just from a glass, it is fine for the person to pour for themselves.
- Blowing one's nose in public is a faux pas. Also, the Japanese do not use their handkerchief for hanakuso, which literally translates as "nose shit".
- For women, not wearing cosmetics or a brassiere may be seen as unprofessional or expressive of disregard for the situation.
- Though many Japanese are lenient with foreigners in this regard, it is a faux pas not to use polite language and honorifics when speaking in Japanese with someone having a higher social status. The Japanese honorific "san" can be used when speaking English but is never used when referring to one’s self. Japanese place surnames before given names but often reverse the order for the benefit of Westerners.
- A smile or laughter from a Japanese person may mean that they are feeling nervous or uncomfortable, and not necessarily happy.
- Tipping is rarely practiced in Japan, and can be considered as an insult, except in certain cases, such as tipping a surgeon for an operation, when visiting a high class ryokan, or when dealing with house movers. Consult the locals to be sure what is appropriate. If one can’t be bothered to wait for change, it is okay to tell a taxi driver to keep it.
- In the rituals of a Japanese cremation, the relatives pick the bones out of the ashes with chopsticks, and two relatives may then hold the same piece of bone at the same time. This is the only occasion in which it is acceptable for two people to hold the same item at the same time with chopsticks. At all other times, holding anything with chopsticks by two people at the same time, including passing an item from chopsticks to chopsticks, will remind everyone witnessing this of the funeral of a close relative.

== Korea ==
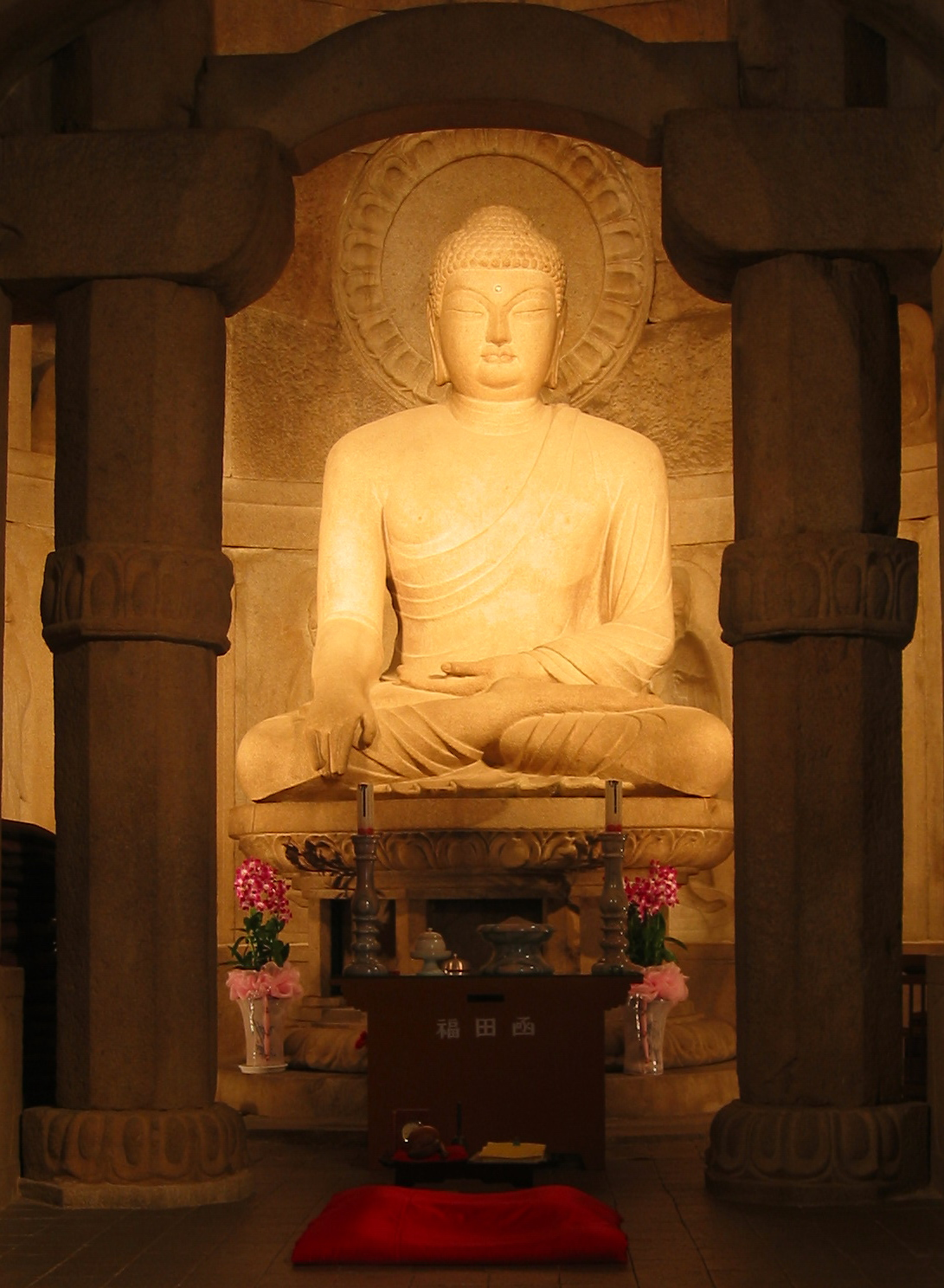
Like many Asian people, Koreans observe points of etiquette related to local forms of Buddhism. Shown here is the Buddha statue at Seokguram Grotto, a National Treasure of South Korea.

- The number 4 is considered unlucky, so gifts should not be given in multiples of 4. Giving 7 of an item is considered lucky.
- Blowing one's nose at the table, even if the food is spicy, is mildly offensive. If necessary, take a trip to the toilet or at least be very discreet.
- In restaurants and bars, pouring one's own drink is a faux pas. Keep an eye on the neighbors' glasses and fill them if they are empty; they will do the same. To avoid over drinking, simply leave the glass near full. When pouring drinks, hold bottle in right hand, lightly place left hand on forearm near elbow.
- When someone of a significantly higher social position pours one a drink, it is considered proper to turn away from that person when drinking it.
- A couple kissing each other in public is a faux pas, since it is not seen as modest.
- See also Traditional Korean table etiquette.

== Malaysia ==
- It is considered rude to wear shoes inside a house. One would usually take off shoes outside the house and leave them by the door.
- When shaking the hand of elders (such as parents, grandparents or teachers) the younger person is expected to touch the top of the elder's palm with the tip of their nose or forehead to express respect. It is similar to kissing a hand, but only using the tip of the nose or forehead, not lips. This is generally done by the Malays or Malaysian Muslims as a sign of respect. It is considered rude to not "Salam" a person whether they are visiting or being visited.
- It is considered improper to show affection (such as kissing) one's partner or spouse in public as it is not showing modesty and piety.
- One usually eats with the right hand.
- When handing things to people either the right hand or both hands should be used, not the left hand.
- Girls should dress modestly and not wear revealing clothing.
- Malaysia’s population of Malays, Chinese and Indians all strive to maintain “face” and avoid shame both in public and private situations. Face can be lost by openly criticizing, insulting, doing something that brings shame to a group or individual, showing anger at another person. Face can be saved by remaining calm and courteous, using non-verbal communication to say “no” etc.
- People who are slightly older than one are called "kak" (to a girl, means older sister) and "abang" (to a boy, means older brother). "Adik" is used when referring to someone younger than the speaker (Both male and female, means younger sibling), people much older than the speaker, or people who are married with children "makcik" (aunty) or "pakcik" (uncle). It is respectful to call people by those names rather than their given names, even if they are not related to one.
- When greeting a Malaysian ruler or a royal family member, pressing the palms of one's hands together while giving a slight bow shows respect.
- It is also important to address others according to their honorifics. For example, one must address a teacher as "Cikgu" and "Datuk" for someone given the honorary title by a head of state. If unsure, it is better to address a man as "Encik" (Mister), and a woman as "Puan" (Mrs or Miss), or "Cik" (Miss).
- The head is considered sacred and should not be touched by hand.
- The feet are considered symbolically unclean and should not be used to point to a person or a thing, and the soles of the feet should not be directly exposed to another person when sitting down on the floor.
- Please point at someone using the thumb. It is rude to point at someone with the index finger in Malaysia.
- To beckon someone, one motions downward with the palm of the hand facing the ground. It is rude to beckon someone with the palm of the hand up.
- Never say "Oi!" when calling out someone.
- When speaking to elders, bosses or teachers, one should refrain from using the informal pronoun "aku" (me) and "kau" (you) and instead use "saya". Using "aku" and "kau" in conversations with parents and teachers is a sign of insolence, as the speaker acts as if treating them as equals.

== Pakistan ==
In urban Sindh and in other parts of the country, men and women usually lower their head and lift their hand to their forehead to make the "adab" gesture when greeting each other, instead of a handshake.

- For respect, when a man is greeting a woman younger or around the same age as him, he must lightly put his hand on the top of her head.
- Women greeting each other usually hug as a sign of respect, whether they know each other or not, and politely ask the guest to sit down while bringing something to eat or drink, even if the guest has no intention of eating.

== Philippines ==
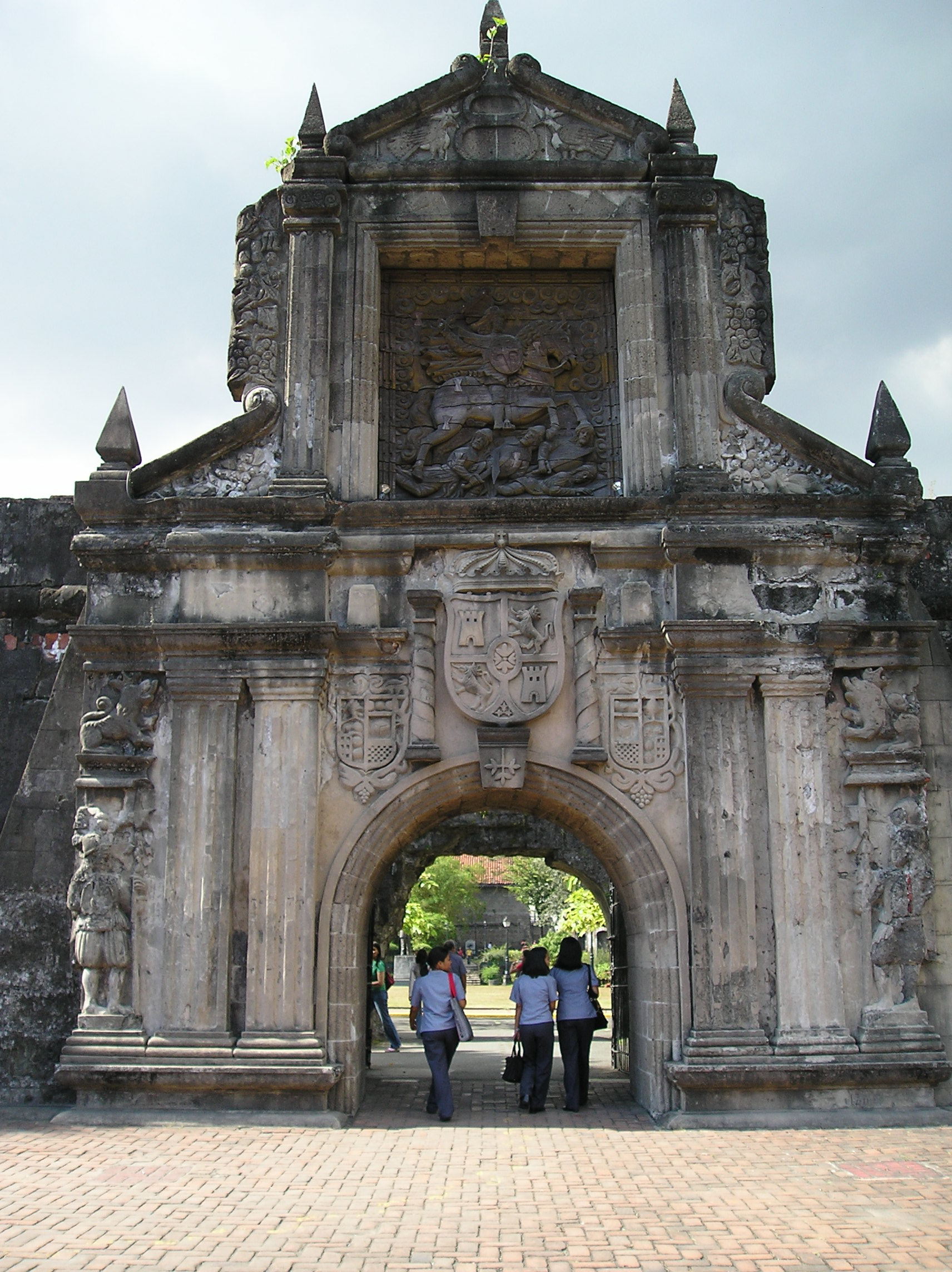
The gate of Fuerza de Santiago in Manila. The three centuries of Spanish rule left an indelible mark on Filipino customs, art and society.

Three centuries of Spanish and 48 years of American rule, as well as the influence of Japan, China, India, Middle East and the West, have added to the classic indigenous etiquette of the Philippines. It has become a unique and particularly formal sense of etiquette concerning social functions, filial piety and public behaviour. Age is an important determinant in social structure and behaviour, dictating the application of honour, precedence, and title.

== Singapore ==
- In Singapore, a former crown colony of the United Kingdom, many standards of etiquette in Western societies apply. The Chinese, Malay and Indian ethnic groups might follow the etiquette shown here for China, Malaysia and India respectively.

== Thailand ==
- The Thais hold their king and the Royal Family in very high regard and any sign of disrespect is potentially an imprisonable offence under lèse-majesté law. There have been a number of people arrested for saying disrespect things about the Royal Family.
- Currency, postage stamps, magazines covers and any other items with the king’s image are never tossed to the ground or treated harshly. Even licking the back of a postage stamp is considered disrespectful. Most especially, these items are never trod upon as it is a sign of utmost disrespect to place one’s foot above the head of the king. Money or other items dropped accidentally should immediately be picked up and reverently brushed, not trodden on to stop from rolling away.
- The head is considered sacred in Thailand and should not be touched by hand.
- The feet are considered symbolically unclean and should not be used to point to a person or a thing, and the soles of the feet should not be directly exposed to another person when sitting down on the floor.

== Turkey ==
- Family members and friends speak to one another using the second singular person sen, and adults use sen to address minors. In formal situations (meeting people for the first time, business, customer-clerk, colleagues) plural second-person siz is used almost exclusively. In very formal situations, double plural second-person sizler may refer to a much-respected person. Rarely, third person plural conjugation of the verb (but not the pronoun) may be used to emphasize utmost respect. In the imperative, there are three forms: second person singular for informal, second person plural for formal, and double plural second person for very formal situations. Thus, the imperative forms of the verb gelmek, "to come", are gel (second person singular, informal), gelin (second person plural, formal), and geliniz (double second person plural, very formal and not frequently used)
- Turkish honorifics generally follow the first name, especially if they refer to gender or particular social statuses (e.g. Name Bey (Mr.), Name Hanım (Ms.), Name Hoca (teacher or cleric)). Such honorifics are used both in formal and informal situations. A newer honorific is Sayın, which precedes the surname or full name, and is not gender-specific. (e.g. Sayın Name Surname, or Sayın Surname). They are generally used in very formal situations.
- Shoes are not worn inside; Turkish people don't want the floor to be stained by soil, sand or dust that may be attached to the soles. Instead, shoes are removed before entering the house, either left outside near the doorstep or placed in the shoe cabinet at the entryway, and often replaced with slippers. Just wearing socks is also acceptable in informal situations. There are also separate slippers used when using a bathroom, due to hygienic reasons.
- As beliefs regarding bad luck from open umbrellas indoors are taken seriously by some people, close umbrellas before bringing them inside. Some people believe that passing a knife or scissors directly to a person is bad luck as well. These beliefs are especially common among the elderly.
- Hosts typically insist that guests keep eating. One needn’t eat much, but should at least taste a bit of everything on the table and express appreciation for the taste and quality.
- Food or any small favor in general will generally be offered more than once and it is polite to decline it the first time with an expression implying effort to avoid causing inconvenience.
- Avoid hand gestures with which one is unfamiliar, such as making a fist with the thumb placed between the middle and index fingers. Many of these are offensive.
- Any comment to a person about the appearance of the latter's female relatives or wife might be seen as rude.
- If invited to dinner, one is expected to bring something (usually dessert). Avoid bringing alcohol unless sure that the host partakes. If the guest brings food or drinks (as usual) it is customary to offer it in the proper context during the visit.
- Friends might greet each other by shaking hands and touching or kissing one or both of the cheeks. This is inappropriate for business.
- Before starting to eat at the dinner table, one should wait for the elders to start eating first. But, while drinking water the minors have priority.
- Blowing one's nose at a table is met with disgust and frowned upon even if one has cold. As sniffing is also considered rude at a table, it is best to clear one's nose at a toilet as often as necessary. These activities are in general regarded distasteful, and are best kept away from social interactions.
- It is usually considered disrespectful to sit legs crossed near one's parents, grandparents, possibly other elderly relatives and in front of one's teacher. When sitting legs crossed, it is offensive to point one's hanging foot at someone, especially someone older or of higher status. Similarly, it is in general rude to show the bottom of one's shoes or feet.
- A couple kissing each other is a faux pas in more conservative regions, since it is not seen as modest.
- The entire country practices one minute of silence on 10 November at 9:05 am. This silence is observed in the memory of the founder of Turkey, Mustafa Kemal Atatürk.

== See also ==
- Etiquette in Africa
- Etiquette in Australia and New Zealand
- Etiquette in North America
- Etiquette in Europe
- Etiquette in Latin America
- Etiquette in the Middle East
- Worldwide etiquette
