= Stuff Dutch People Like =

Dutch comedy website

Stuff Dutch People Like (est. in 2011) is an English-language website and Facebook page about Dutch culture. The website describes in a humorous way typical Dutch customs, traditions and habits, seen from the eyes of a foreigner.

== History ==
Stuff Dutch People Like was created as a blog in 2011 by Canadian Colleen Geske. The blog was originally created for the entertainment of expats and internationals living in the Netherlands, but has since become especially popular among Dutch people. It covered such topics as Dutch chocolate sprinkles (hagelslag), liquorice, herring, Sinterklaas and Zwarte Piet, unique Dutch swear words, Dutch greetings (three kisses) and Dutch birthday celebrations. In 2013, Stuff Dutch People Like published their first book in the series. The topic of Dutch directness is extensively covered in the series.

== Books ==
Stuff Dutch People Like has published 5 books on the topic of Dutch culture covering Dutch culture, motherhood, language and cuisine.

- Stuff Dutch People Like
- Lekker Nederlands
- Stuff Dutch People Say
- Stuff Dutch People Eat
- Stuff Dutch Moms Like
- You Know You're Dutch when...
