= Tami Lancut Leibovitz =

Israeli consultant and author

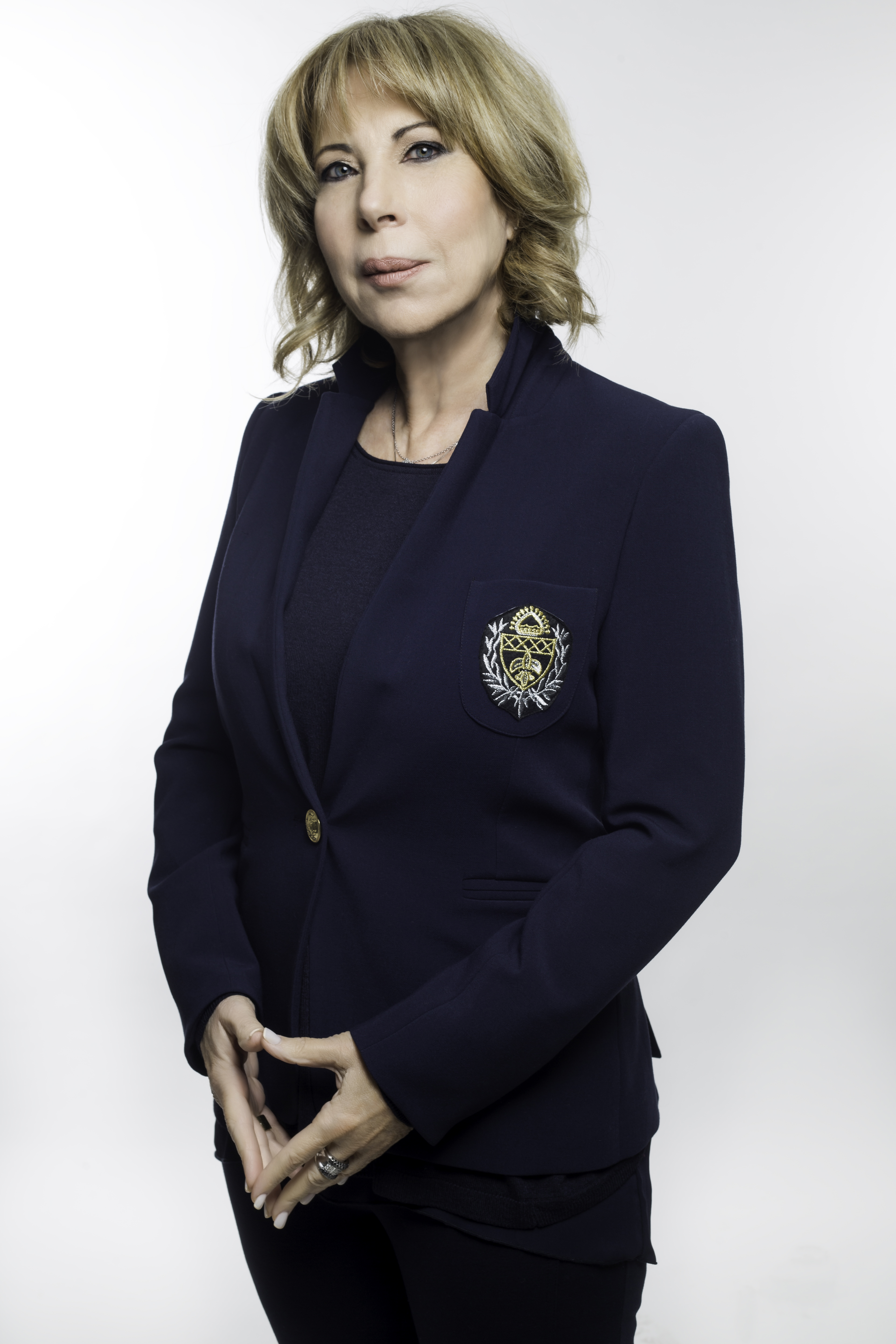

Tami Lancut Leibovitz (Hebrew: תמי לנצוט ליבוביץ) is an Israeli consultant and author on matters of etiquette and personal image.

== Career ==
Lancut Leibovitz worked as an interior decorator. In 1979, she began her etiquette career with mentoring from Hannah Bavly, who trained Israeli Foreign Ministry staff in manners.

Since 1985, Lancut Leibovitz has served as the president of the Institute for Personal Image, Manners, & International Etiquette. The institute provides consultation services on etiquette for Israeli executives and politicians.

Lancut Leibovitz developed the International Business Language (IBL) Code, which advices on considering different cultures and geographical locations in business and political campaigns. The IBL code also includes hospitality protocols and a code of services for hotels, restaurants, and event managers hosting state officials and key figures.

From 2018 until June 2023, she served as the president of the Israeli Confrérie de la Chaîne des Rôtisseurs and continues to be active as a Member Du Conseil Magistral.

== Selected publications ==
- לנצוט ליבוביץ, תמי; בבלי, חנה (1995). שאלה של נימוס: נימוסים והליכות על פי חנה בבלי (in Hebrew). Tel Aviv: ליתם מנרס. OCLC 32487248.
- לנצוט־ליבוביץ, תמי; Rubitsiḳ, Yuval; בר, שולמית (1996). בגובה העיניים (in Hebrew). Tel Aviv: Daniʼelah Di-Nur. ISBN 9653780379. OCLC 36170210.
- לנצוט ליבוביץ, תמי (2005). Civility: המדריך להתנהלות חברתית (in Hebrew). Tel Aviv: תמי לנצוט ליבוביץ. OCLC 174112880.
- Lancut Leibovitz, Tami (2017-05-21). International Business Language: Book 1 (Revised 2017 ed.). Tami Lancut Leibovitz. ISBN 9789657724026.
