= Etiquette in Africa =

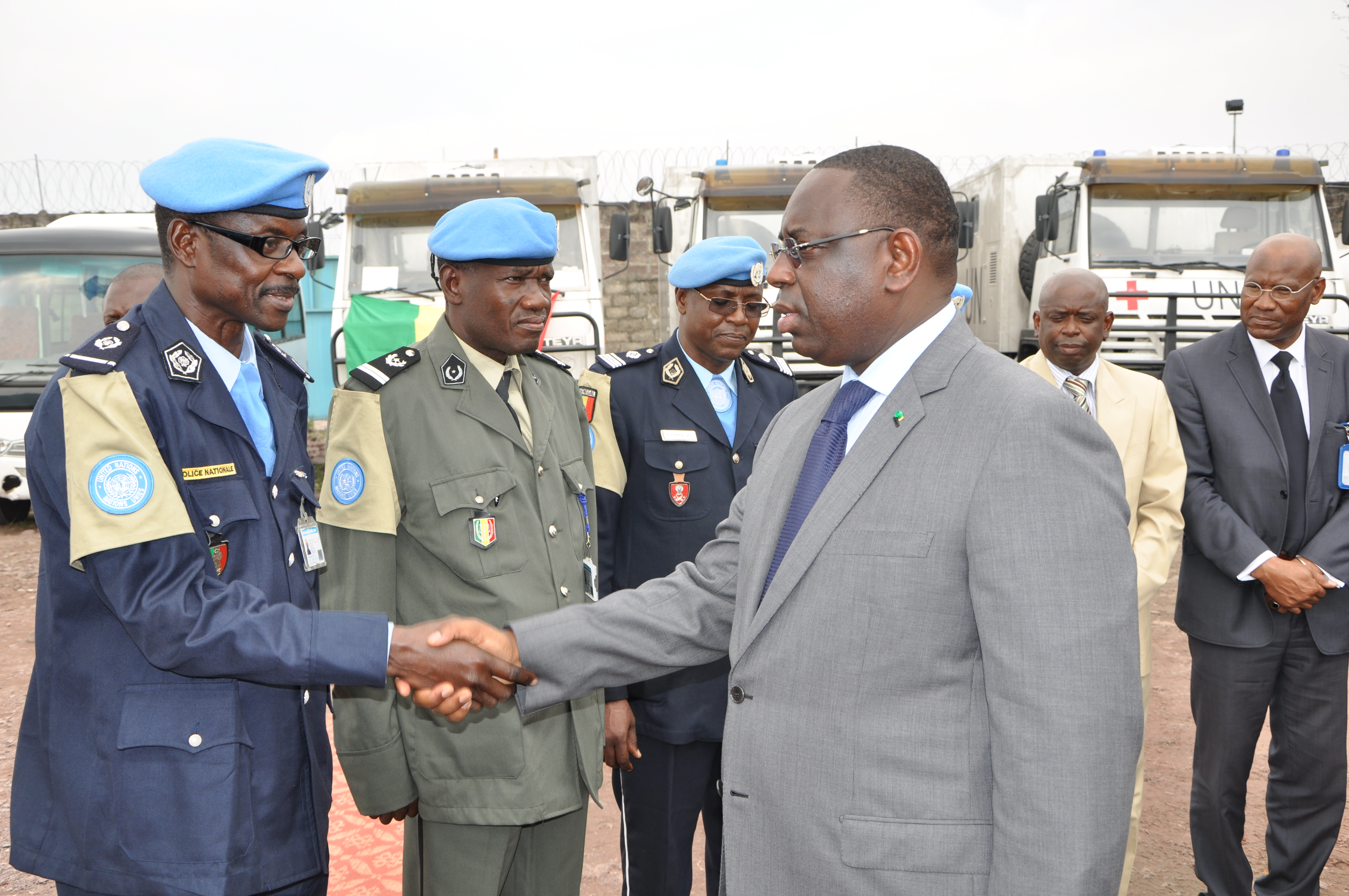
President of Senegal Macky Sall shaking hands with local government officials

As expectations regarding good manners differ from person to person and vary according to each situation, no treatise on the rules of etiquette nor any list of faux pas can ever be complete. As the perception of behaviors and actions vary, intercultural competence is essential. However, a lack of knowledge about customs and expectations within African cultures can make even the best intentioned person seem rude, selfish, or worse.

== Generalizations ==
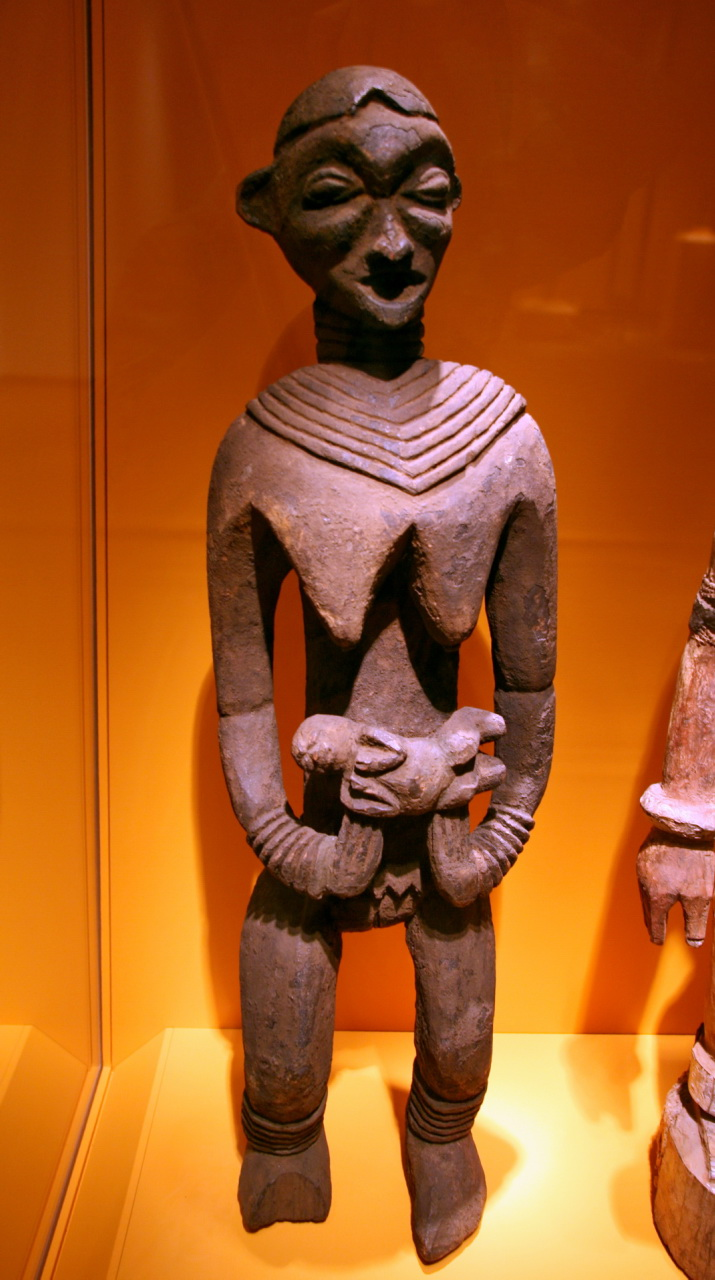
Wood Bangwa sculpture of a female figure with child, carved as a special sign of respect and honor.

Etiquette across Africa is not uniform. Even within the small countries in Africa, etiquette may not be uniform: within a single country there may be differences in customs, especially where there are many ethnicities, as in Eritrea where there are nine ethnic groups. Africa represents an enormous expanse of geography with an incalculable amount of cultures and customs.

=== Religion ===
A number of countries in Africa have many traditions based in Islam and share values with other parts of the Muslim world. As such, guidelines regarding etiquette in the Middle East are often applicable to these places. This holds especially true in Muslim majority countries which include many of the West African nations such as Senegal, Chad and Mali. Even though most people would consider themselves as Muslim, many adherents in these areas mix it with local animism. Many, whatever their religious adherence, to some extent believe in supernatural forces and that certain people, primarily doctors, herbalists, diviners, or marabouts (religious figures) have the power to utilise these forces. It is common to see people wearing amulets (called “gris-gris”) around their waist, neck, arms, or legs. People consult with diviners or marabouts to protect themselves against evil spirits, to improve their financial status or bring them love, to cure chronic illnesses, to settle disputes, or to place a curse on another person.

=== Southern Africa ===
In Southern Africa, it is considered polite to receive a gift with the right hand. In interactions between social classes (e.g. between a young person and an older man) the younger person should not meet the eye of the older (this politeness is perceived as evasiveness by western cultures). It is considered impolite to disappoint an outsider, so queries such as "how far is it," can be met with positive sounding answers like "it is really close" when the destination is very far away. It is polite to pretend agreement with another's point of view, even if there is no agreement. Holding out both hands cupped together is the proper way to respectfully request or beg for a gift.

== See also ==
- Africa
- Culture of Africa
- Etiquette in Asia
- Etiquette in Australia and New Zealand
- Etiquette in Canada and the United States
- Etiquette in Europe
- Etiquette in Latin America
- Etiquette in the Middle East
- Worldwide etiquette
