= Etiquette in Latin America =

Etiquette in Latin America varies by country and by region within a given country.

== Generalizations ==
Map of Latin America

There are several definitions of Latin America, but all of them define a huge expanse of geography with an incalculable amount of different customs. However, some generalizations can be made:

- Compared to much of the English-speaking world, people from areas of Latin America may demonstrate more relaxed and casual behaviour and be more comfortable with loud talk, exaggerated gestures and physical contact. It is common to greet known people by kissing them on the cheek.
- In addition, many Latin American people have a smaller sense of personal space than people from English-speaking cultures. It may be rude to step away from someone when they are stepping closer.
- At some finer restaurants, it may be considered rude for the staff to bring a customer the check without the customer first requesting it.
- It is considered impolite to "toss" objects to people instead of directly handing it to them.
- The American "come here" gesture of palm upwards with the fingers curled back can be considered a romantic solicitation.

== Specific regions ==
The following points of etiquette apply most specifically to a certain region:

=== Brazil ===
- Brazilians speak Portuguese, not Spanish. Addressing someone who speaks Portuguese in Spanish, although most Brazilians understand Spanish to a reasonable degree, may be considered very offensive.
- In Brazil, a form of the American "ok" gesture is obscene when directed at someone with the symbol upside down (back of hands down, circle forward to someone, rest of fingers to your self pointing any side), implying something like "go fuck yourself!". However, the standard "okay" gesture is also used, as is the "thumbs up" gesture.
- The gesture of "flipping someone off" by hitting the wrist against the inside of the elbow (sometimes called "a banana" in Brazil) is considered playful and not very offensive (in some other parts of the world, this is more akin to "the finger").
- Giving someone of the opposite gender a gift may be easily misinterpreted as a romantic overture, except for birthdays.
- In some parts of the country, particularly in rural or suburban areas, homes may not have doorbells. The appropriate way to announce one's arrival is to stand in the yard and clap one's hands. If no one comes to the door, then the visitor may approach the door, knock, and then step back away from the door and await a response. This is especially applicable in regards to small, thin-walled cottages that offer less privacy than homes in North America.
- In the northeast of the country it is considered rude to enter the house with one's shoes: visitors should remove their shoes before entering a house.
- In the northeast region and rural areas it seen as disrespectful not to ask for a blessing from parents and family, so it is common to see children and adults asking: "Abenção?" or "Bença" (more informal) and the parents answer with "Deus te abençoe" (God may bless you).
- Tipping is not common in Brazil.
- Children are not allowed to talk in adult conversation.
- Use napkins when touching one's food.
- It is seen as rude to point at someone in the street or out in public.
- When meeting someone, it is common to give one kiss on each cheek. Men may greet women in this way, but not typically other men.
- At restaurants, usually everyone who eats pays a portion of the bill. It is common to split the bill on dates.

== See also ==
- Etiquette
- Etiquette in Canada and the United States
- Etiquette in Europe
- Etiquette in Australia and New Zealand
- Etiquette in the Middle East
- Etiquette in Asia
- Etiquette in Africa
