= Amelands =

Dialect of Dutch spoken on Ameland

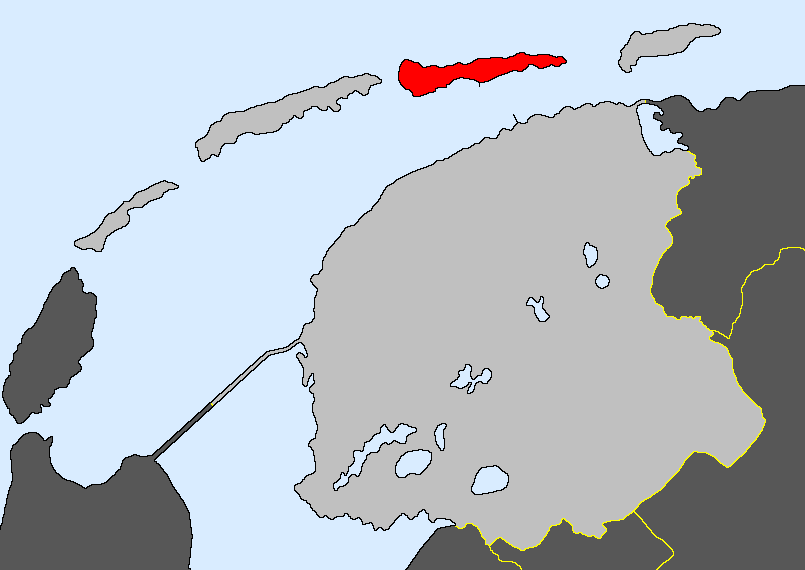
Map with Ameland shown in red

Amelandic (Amelands) is a dialect of Dutch, spoken on the Wadden Sea island of Ameland. It is especially closely related to the Midslands dialect, spoken in the middle segment of the neighboring island of Terschelling. Amelands, which has about 2,900 speakers, is the only dialect of the Dutch Wadden Sea islands that seems to be maintaining itself in its community, whereas all the other Dutch or West Frisian island dialects are losing ground rapidly in favor of Standard Dutch.

== Phonology ==
Along with Midslands it is the only dialect of Dutch which does not feature final obstruent devoicing.

== Bibliography ==
- Van der Veen, Klaas F. (2001), "13. West Frisian Dialectology and Dialects", in Munske, Horst Haider; Århammar, Hans (eds.), Handbook of Frisian studies, Tübingen: Max Niemeyer Verlag GmbH, pp. 98–116, ISBN 3-484-73048-X
