= Midsland =

Midsland Midslân
- Village
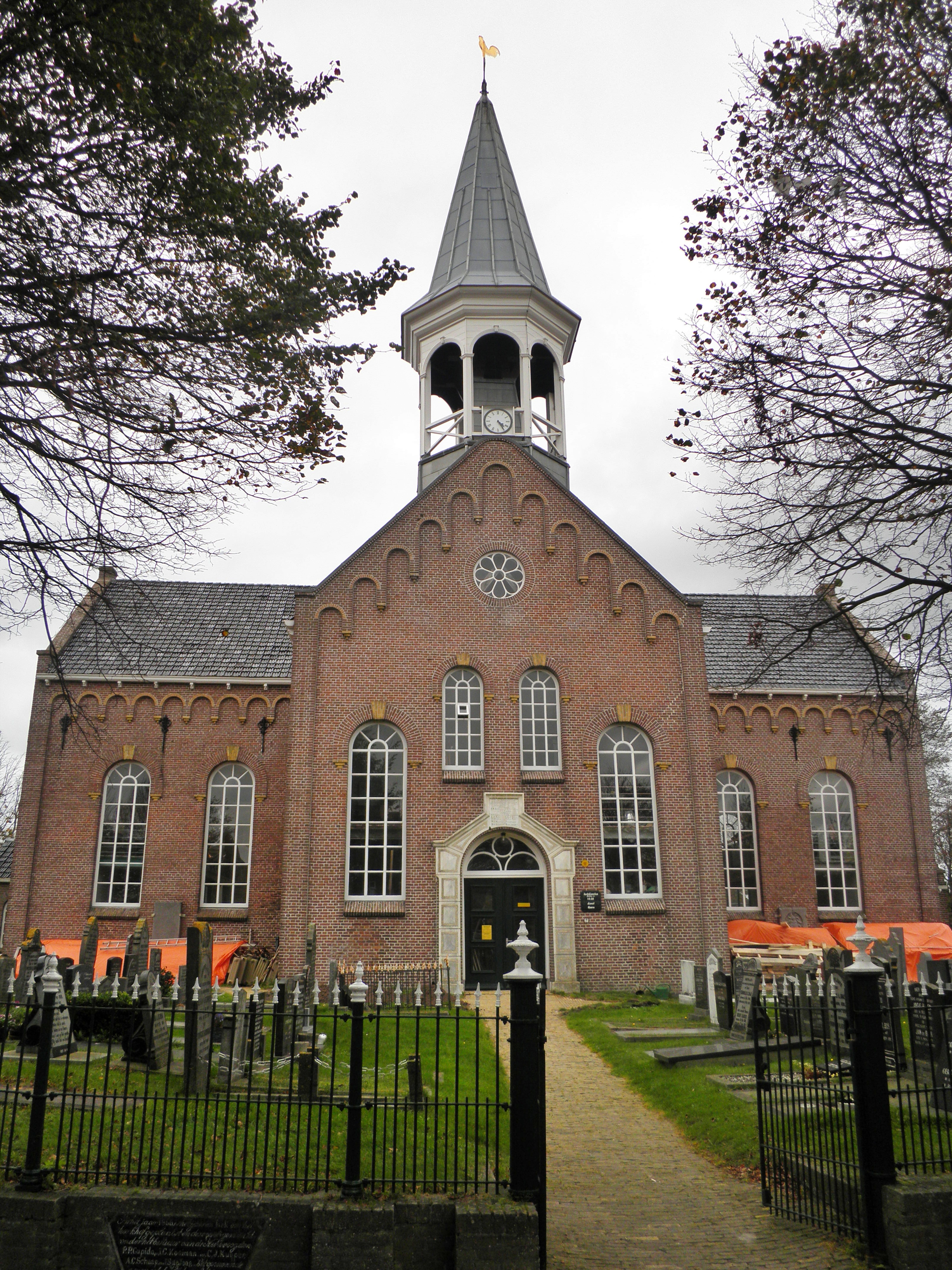
- Holy Cross Church

- Location of Midsland on Terschelling

- Location in the Netherlands
- Country: Netherlands
- Province: Friesland
- Municipality: Terschelling

Population (1 January 2017)
  - Total: 1,018
- Time zone: UTC+1 (CET)
  - Summer (DST): UTC+2 (CEST)
- Postal code: 8891
- Dialing code: 0562

Midsland (West Frisian: Midslân) is the second-largest village on the Dutch island of Terschelling, Friesland, in the north of the Netherlands. It had a population of around 1,018 in January 2017.

A statue was placed near the village in 1982 commemorating Het Stryper Wyfke, an old crone who deceived English troops and saved the island's civilian population during Holmes's Bonfire in 1666.

== Sources ==
- Municipality guide Terschelling 2005-2006
