= The UnDutchables =

Book by Colin White and Laurie Boucke

The UnDutchables: an observation of the Netherlands, its culture and its inhabitants
- Fourth edition
- Author: Colin White, Laurie Boucke
- Illustrator: Joke Schat
- Cover artist: Huug Schipper
- Genre: Humor, Non-fiction
- Publisher: XPat Media
- Publication date: 1989, 1991, 1993, 2001, 2006, 2010, 2013, 2017, 2023
- Publication place: Netherlands
- Media type: Trade paperback
- Pages: 292
- ISBN: 978-94-6319-296-5
- Dewey Decimal: 949.207/3 22
- LC Class: DJ290 .W45 2013

The UnDutchables is a book co-written by British author Colin White and American author Laurie Boucke. First published in 1989, the book's 9th edition was released in 2023.

The complete title is: The UnDutchables: an observation of the Netherlands, its culture and its inhabitants. The book has been a best-seller in the Netherlands since 1990 and is also popular in North America, the United Kingdom, Australia, and former Dutch colonies. To remain current, it is updated every 2 to 4 years. The book has been translated into Dutch and traditional Chinese (荷蘭不唬爛).

== Authors ==
When the book was first released, the authors had spent a cumulative total of 22 years living in the Netherlands. Colin White (British) lived and worked there for 7 years, and Laurie Boucke (American) lived and worked there for 15 years.

== Overview ==
There is no plot and the book is not a travel guide. Instead, the authors subject the Netherlands and the Dutch to an irreverent and unmerciful scrutiny. The UnDutchables takes an in-depth humorous look at daily Dutch life, quirks and character, with subjects varying from coffee drinking habits to child rearing, and from train travel to the toilet. The Dutch press refers to the book as a laughing mirror.

== Popular culture ==
The name "The UnDutchables" has been used by numerous entities including a radio program in New Zealand, sports teams, a rock band, an employment agency, an online chat group, a theatrical play, nightclub, firmware, and many videos on YouTube. In 2004 White-Boucke Publishing acquired a Trademark registration for the name "UnDutchables" and for a line of UnDutchables merchandise that includes a Dutch-style perpetual birthday calendar, a desk calendar with daily jokes, coffee mugs, T-shirts and pens.

== History ==
In 1987 near the end of a long stay in the Netherlands, Laurie Boucke had the idea to write an in-depth humor book about that country. At the time, there were no books of this genre readily available. Laurie Boucke began formulating the structure and text during the authors' last months as Dutch residents. Colin White joined the project when his interest was piqued by the advent of desktop publishing. New editions have been published in 1989, 1991, 1993, 2001, 2006, 2010, 2013, 2017 and 2023. The first edition appeared in a comic book / magazine format (8.5" x 11") with 80 pages. Subsequent editions have been in a more standard book format, with the most recent edition being 296 pages in length and consisting of 20 chapters.

In 1989, renowned Dutch journalist Johannes van Dam spotted the book in the front window of the Athenaeum bookstore in Amsterdam and wrote a review for the Dutch daily Het Parool. In his review he wrote that the book "in a very exact yet funny way discloses all the secrets about us that we really would have preferred to keep to ourselves." This review launched the book in the Netherlands. There have been many subsequent reviews. For example, in 1991, de Telegraaf called the book a "laughing mirror: readers can only laugh as they concede their ridiculous habits." The European called the book "a cult among English-speaking expatriates". The Washington Post described it as "a sometimes funny, sometimes scathing portrayal of Dutch national habits." Film rights were optioned in 1996 when a studio hoped to sign John Cleese as the main presenter. Cleese was not available, and the film rights reverted to the authors.
