= Etiquette in the Middle East =

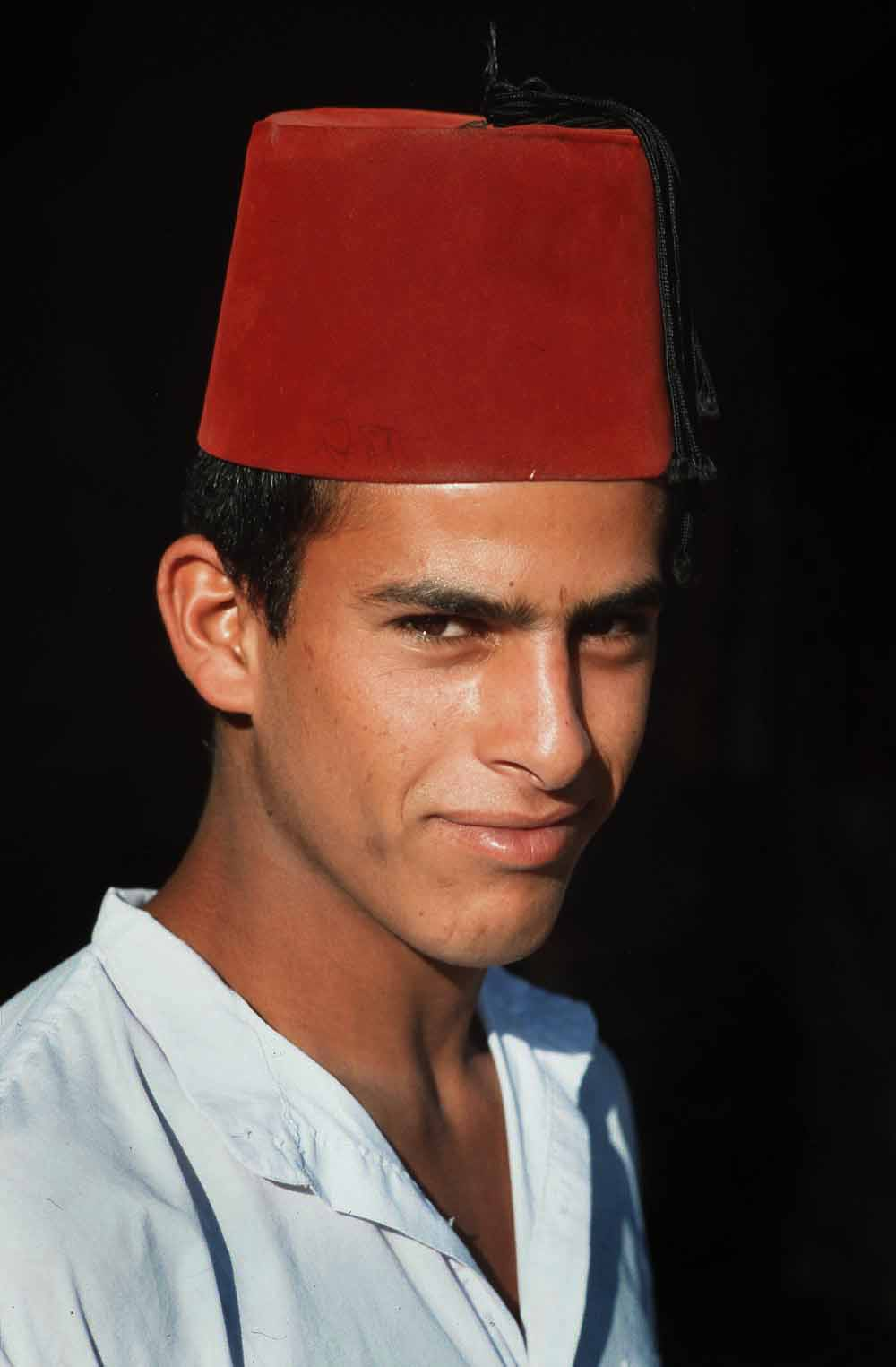
The Middle East contains a multitude of societies with different traditions regarding etiquette. Bedouins like this young man wearing a fez are traditionally renowned for their hospitality.

Many matters of etiquette in the Middle East are connected to Islam as it is written in the Qur'an and how it has been traditionally understood and practiced throughout the centuries. Prescribed Islamic etiquette is referred to as Adab, and described as "refinement, good manners, morals, ethics, decorum, decency, humaneness and righteousness".

As such, many points discussed in this article are applicable in other regions of the Islamic world. This holds especially true in Muslim majority countries outside Middle East.

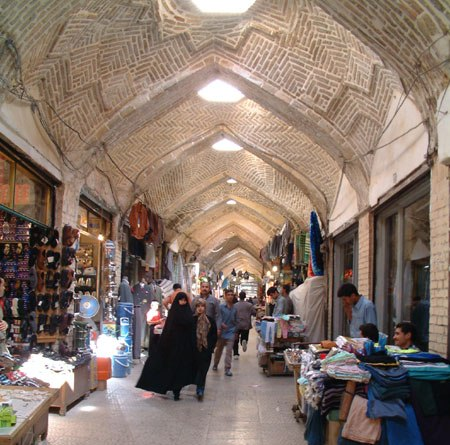
The traditional marketplaces of the Middle East might seem chaotic and intimidating to foreigners who don't comprehend the time-honored etiquette that governs transactions within. Shown here is a Bazaar in Iran.

The Middle East is home to many people who follow faiths besides Islam. Most notable among them are the churches of Eastern Orthodox Christianity, Copts and other adherents of Oriental Orthodoxy, Maronites, Melkites other Catholics of the Eastern Rites as well as the Roman Rite, Druze, Zoroastrians, Baháʼís, Yazidis, Mandaeans, and various Jewish denominations.

In many cases, however, Muslims and non-Muslims in the Middle East will share characteristics, whether it is the prohibition against pork ordained by both Islamic and Jewish dietary restrictions, a preference for the beverage widely known elsewhere as "Turkish coffee", or knowledge of how to conduct business in a crowded souk without being cheated. It is a place where people with different beliefs often share the same traditions.

== Points of etiquette ==
Although the Middle East is a large expanse of geography with a variety of customs, noting the following points of etiquette can be useful when dealing with people around the world who have been raised according to the traditions of the Middle East or, in some cases, Muslim societies elsewhere.

- Regarding head attire specifically, the etiquette at many Muslim holy sites requires that a headscarf -although it is not necessary and many if not most (men) do not wear it- or some other modest head covering be worn. For women, this might be a hijab and, for men, it might be a taqiyah (cap), turban, or keffiyeh. A kippah or other head covering is expected for men in synagogues and other places where Jews pray. Orthodox Christian sites might require the removal of hats by men but will expect women to cover their hair with a kerchief or veil.
- Public displays of affection between people of the opposite sex, including between married people, are frowned upon everywhere more conservative values hold sway. Public displays of affection include activities as minor as hand-holding.
- In many cases, people of the same sex holding hands while walking is considered an ordinary display of friendship without romantic connotations.
- In a related point, many people in the Middle East claim a more modest amount of personal space than that which is usual elsewhere. Accordingly, it can seem rude for an individual to step away when another individual is stepping closer.
- Special respect is paid to older people in many circumstances. This can include standing when older people enter a room, always greeting older people before others present (even if they are better known to you), standing when speaking to one’s elders, kissing the head of an elderly relative, and serving older people first at a meal table.

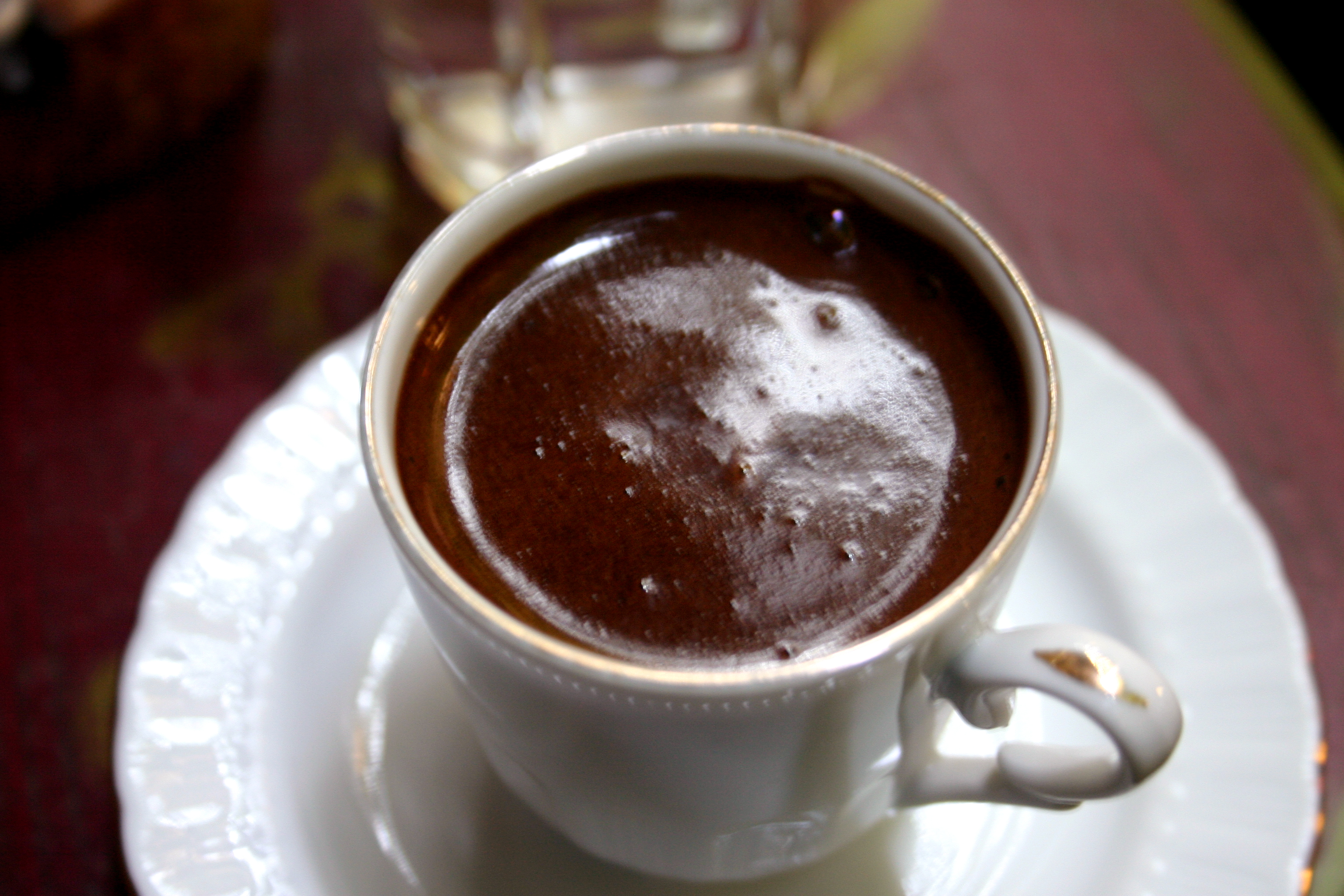
Hospitality is held in high regard throughout the Middle East. Some hosts take pride in the laborious preparation of what is known in Europe as “Turkish coffee”, grinding fresh-roasted coffee beans to a fine powder, dissolving sugar, and carefully regulating the heat to produce a result that meets exacting standards.

- In Iran, the "thumbs up" gesture is considered an offensive insult.
- Displaying the sole of one's foot or touching somebody with one's shoe is often considered rude. This includes sitting with one's feet or foot elevated. In some circumstances, shoes should be removed before entering a living room.
- Many in the Middle East do not separate professional and personal life. Doing business revolves much more around personal relationships, family ties, trust, and honor. There is a tendency to prioritize personal matters above all else. It is therefore crucial that business relationships are built on mutual friendship and trust. According to the manners instructor Tami Lancut Leibovitz it might be common for an Israeli to ask others some personal questions about money or children.

== See also ==
- Adab (Islam)
- Etiquette
- Jewish customs of etiquette
- Taarof
