= Putting down =

Putting or put down may refer to:

- Animal euthanasia
- Putdown, a form of incivility
- Wicket#Putting down a wicket, in cricket
