= Work ethic =

Belief in the virtues of labor

Work ethic is a belief that work and diligence have a moral benefit and an inherent ability, virtue, or value to strengthen character and individual abilities. The desire or determination to work serves as the foundation for values centered on the importance of work or industrious work. The social ingraining of this value is considered to enhance character through hard work that align with an individual's field of work.

== Factors of a good work ethic ==
Proponents of a strong work ethic consider it to be important for achieving goals, that it gives strength to their orientation and the right mindset. A work ethic is a set of moral principles a person uses in their job. People who possess a strong work ethic embody certain principles that guide their work behaviour; according to proponents, a strong work ethic will result in the production of high-quality work which is consistent. The output motivates them to stay on track. A good work ethic fuels an individual's needs and goals, it is related to the initiative by a person for the objectives. It is considered by fans as a source of self-respect, satisfaction, and fulfillment.

Factors are:

1. Goal-oriented actions: It is not about making plans or the next logical steps; it is about getting things done so that the work invested would not be counter-productive.
2. Prioritized focus: Focusing on qualitative activities that a person is responsible for and in areas where they can make a difference or a high impact based on objectives.
3. Being available and reliable: Spending time on the work and building oneself up for the task.
4. Conscientiousness: A desire to do a task well, being vigilant and organized.
5. Creating a rewarding routine/system: Engaging in tasks that provide strength and energy which can be transferred to your ultimate goals, creating a habit and a habitat for success.
6. Embracing positivity: Shape a problem with the statement "good, (action) (problem)", e.g. "I'm tired and it is time for a workout" leads to "Good. Workout tired".

Work ethic also has been measured as a multidimensional variable composed of seven factors, including self-reliance, ethical behavior, valuing leisure time, hard work, giving importance/centrality of work, productive use of time, and delay of gratification.

A negative work ethic is a behavior of a single individual or a group that has led to a systematic lack of productivity, reliability, accountability and a growing sphere of unprofessional/unhealthy relationships (e.g., power politics, lack of social skills, etc.).

=== Assumptions ===
Assumptions about good work ethic, drawn out in the philosophical writings of Goldman, are:

1. The path to what you want is to take action.
2. The success of action plans depends upon how congruent one's worldview (Weltanschauung) is with the society's.
3. Many problems faced are only a temporary breakdown of self-management.
4. Setting time limits for achieving goals helps to overcome the edge of discomforts that time can have on subjective needs.
5. A positive problem-solving or goal attainment experience improves one's ability to cope with the next difficulty.
6. Hardships in life are a normality; they become a problem when they are the same over and over.
7. A person is what they do, and feelings flow from behavior.
8. Feelings can be viewed as beliefs about one's wants.
9. How hard you work will determine how far you go.

== Capitalist view ==
The Puritans who settled in New England around the 17th and 18th centuries believed that working hard at one's call was a sign that one would be saved. They were followed by Calvinists who believed in predestination and had faith that they were chosen or had the call from God to fulfill their duty in the world. To both of them, accumulation of wealth was an indicator of working to their fullest capacity as a response to the call and assurance for receiving salvation. These ideologies are the foundations of the Protestant work ethic.

Max Weber quotes the ethical writings of Benjamin Franklin:

Remember, that time is money. He that can earn ten shillings a day by his labor, and goes abroad, or sits idle, one half of that day, though he spends but sixpence during his diversion or idleness, ought not to reckon that the only expense; he has really spent, or rather thrown away, five shillings besides.

Remember, that money is the prolific, generating nature. Money can beget money, and its offspring can beget more, and so on. Five shillings turned is six, turned again is seven and threepence, and so on, till it becomes a hundred pounds. The more there is of it, the more it produces every turning, so that the profits rise quicker and quicker. He that kills a breeding sow, destroys all her offspring to the thousandth generation. He that murders a crown, destroys all that it might have produced, even scores of pounds.

Franklin believes that valuing time and money is linked to seeing hard work and thriftiness as crucial qualities. He thinks that money, when used wisely, can multiply and create more wealth. This idea mirrors the Protestant ethic's focus on productive labor and reinvesting profits for progress. Franklin also states that reading the Bible showed him the importance of virtue. This also reflects the Christian search for understanding the ethic of living and the struggle to make a living.

Max Weber's definition of work ethic was that a man should work well in his gainful occupation, not merely because he had to but because he wanted to; it was a sign of his virtue and a source of personal satisfaction.

The notion of work ethic continued to grow in the work values of the Western world. In 1903, Theodore Roosevelt expressed, "Far and away the best prize that life offers is the chance to work hard at work worth doing."

Richard Thurnwald, in his work Economies in Primitive Communities, emphasized that people engage in work actively because humans have a natural inclination towards staying active and doing things.

In the 1940s, work ethic was considered very important and nonconformist ideals were dealt autocratically. It is recorded that, at the Ford Company, a worker named John Gallo was dismissed for "laughing with the other fellows, and slowing down the assembly line...".

Steven Malanga refers to "what was once understood as the work ethic—not just hard work but also a set of accompanying virtues, whose crucial role in the development and sustaining of free markets too few now recall".

Experimental studies have shown that people with fair work ethic are able to tolerate tedious jobs with equitable monetary rewards and benefits, are highly critical, and have a tendency for workaholism and a negative relation with leisure activity concepts. They valued meritocracy and egalitarianism.

Even if the death of work were to happen due to technological advancement that eliminates the need for people to work, the desire to stay actively involved in some form of activity is not bound to any particular phasing out of its existence.

== Anti-capitalist view ==
Countercultural groups and communities have challenged these values in recent decades.

The French Leftist philosopher André Gorz wrote:

The work ethic has become obsolete. It is no longer true that producing more means working more, or that producing more will lead to a better way of life. The connection between more and better has been broken; our needs for many products and services are already more than adequately met, and many of our as-yet-unsatisfied needs will be met not by producing more, but by producing differently, producing other things, or even producing less. This is especially true as regards our needs for air, water, space, silence, beauty, time and human contact.

Neither is it true any longer that the more each individual works, the better off everyone will be. In a post-industrial society, not everyone has to work hard in order to survive, though may be forced to anyway due to the economic system. The present crisis has stimulated technological change of an unprecedented scale and speed: 'the micro-chip revolution'. The object and indeed the effect of this revolution has been to make rapidly increasing savings in labour, in the industrial, administrative and service sectors. Increasing production is secured in these sectors by decreasing amounts of labour. As a result, the social process of production no longer needs everyone to work in it on a full-time basis. The work ethic ceases to be viable in such a situation and workbased society is thrown into crisis.

Anti-capitalists believe that the concept of "hard work" is meant by capitalists to delude the working class into becoming loyal servants to the elite, and that working hard, in itself, is not automatically an honorable thing, but only a means to creating more wealth for the people at the top of the economic pyramid. In the Soviet Union, the regime portrayed work ethic as an ideal to strive for.

Periodic Recession cycles, such as the 2000s energy crisis and the Great Recession in 2008, are a contributing factor that holds back work ethic, because the generation that inherits economic decline lives in an economy that is not ready to receive them. Without work there to do, the ethic that is attached to it fails to generate distinctive value. The negative work ethic and power structures that do not value or credit work done or unethically attribute work done as a service or with higher moral ideals have dissolved the ethic presented in the society and turned the focus onto self-centered perks and individualism. Further, urbanization and an emphasis on large-scale businesses has led to eliminating avenues for learning vital concepts about work. Millennials in a research identified what made them unique was consumerist trends like technology use, music/pop culture, liberal/tolerant beliefs, clothes, and individualistic ones like greater intelligence than work, they were not able to distinguish the concept in the traditional understandings of work ethic.

== See also ==
- Arbeit macht frei
- Business ethics
- Contrafreeloading
- Happiness economics
- Humanistic economics
- Laziness
- Locus of control
- Maurice Blanchot (Désoeuvrement · Inoperativity)
- Ora et labora
- Protestant work ethic
- Prussian virtues
- Refusal of work
- Work etiquette
- Workaholism
- Workerism
- Aktion Arbeitsscheu Reich
