= Cutting in =

Act of taking a dance partner from another

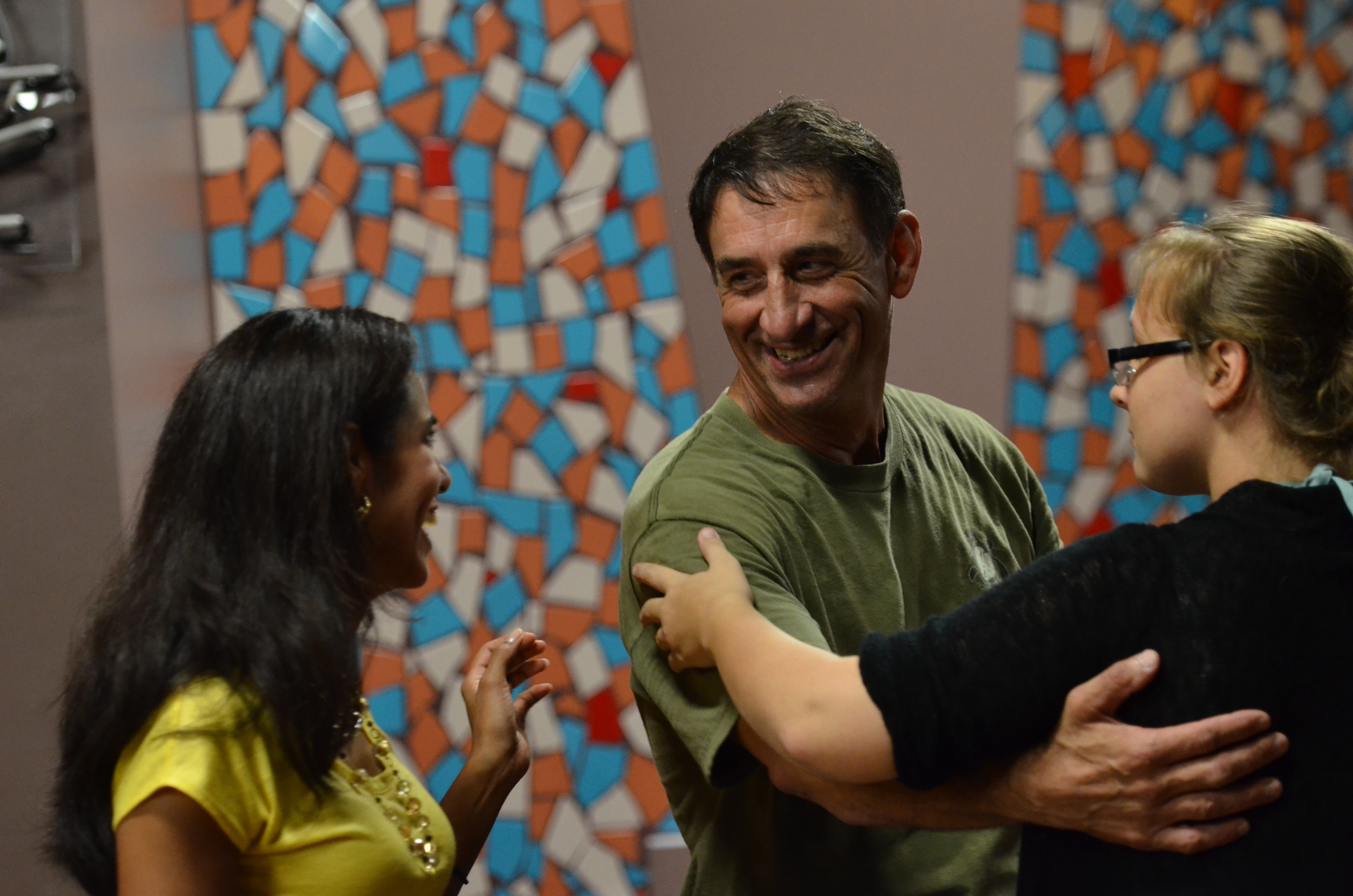
Cutting in may be carried out with a tap on the shoulder and a polite request.

Cutting in is a process, in social dancing, by which a person interrupts two dance partners and claims one as a new partner. As traditionally portrayed in Hollywood films, men are more likely to cut in than women.

Dance etiquette in the 1930s stated that while a dance is in progress, a young man may "cut in" and ask the lady to finish the dance with him. If the dance has not been in progress long, and the young lady wishes to continue it with her current partner, she may nod and say "the next time we pass here". The dance continues around the room, and when the couple reach the same place again, the lady leaves her partner and finishes the dance with the young man who has "cut in". Historian Beth Bailey suggests that it was a sociological response to a society in which men outnumbered women and had to share access to them.

The social signals of cutting have varied over time. Pre-World War II, it was considered a way for a woman to demonstrate her popularity, and one of the only socially acceptable ways to end a dance, such that a couple that did not get cut in on could embarrassingly "get stuck" on the dance floor. In other circumstances, it was perceived as an act of hostility, implying that the person cutting in was a better dancer or more desirable romantic partner. The practice rapidly declined in popularity after World War II.

In Hollywood films, cutting in is often seen as a romantic gesture in which a man sweeps a woman off her feet. In The Sound of Music, Maria and Captain von Trapp's romance first begins to blossom when he cuts in on a dance between his son and Maria. In other cases, cutting in can add tension by interrupting a romantic moment between two protagonists. In the Disney film Enchanted, Giselle and Robert share a romantic dance, only to be cut in on by Nancy, leaving the couple longing for more time together.

The move is the subject of the 1962 top-10 US R&B chart song "Cuttin' In" by Johnny "Guitar" Watson.

== See also ==
- Glossary of partner dance terms
- Money dance, a dance in which cutting in is expected
