= Royal court =

Court of a monarch, or at some periods an important nobleman

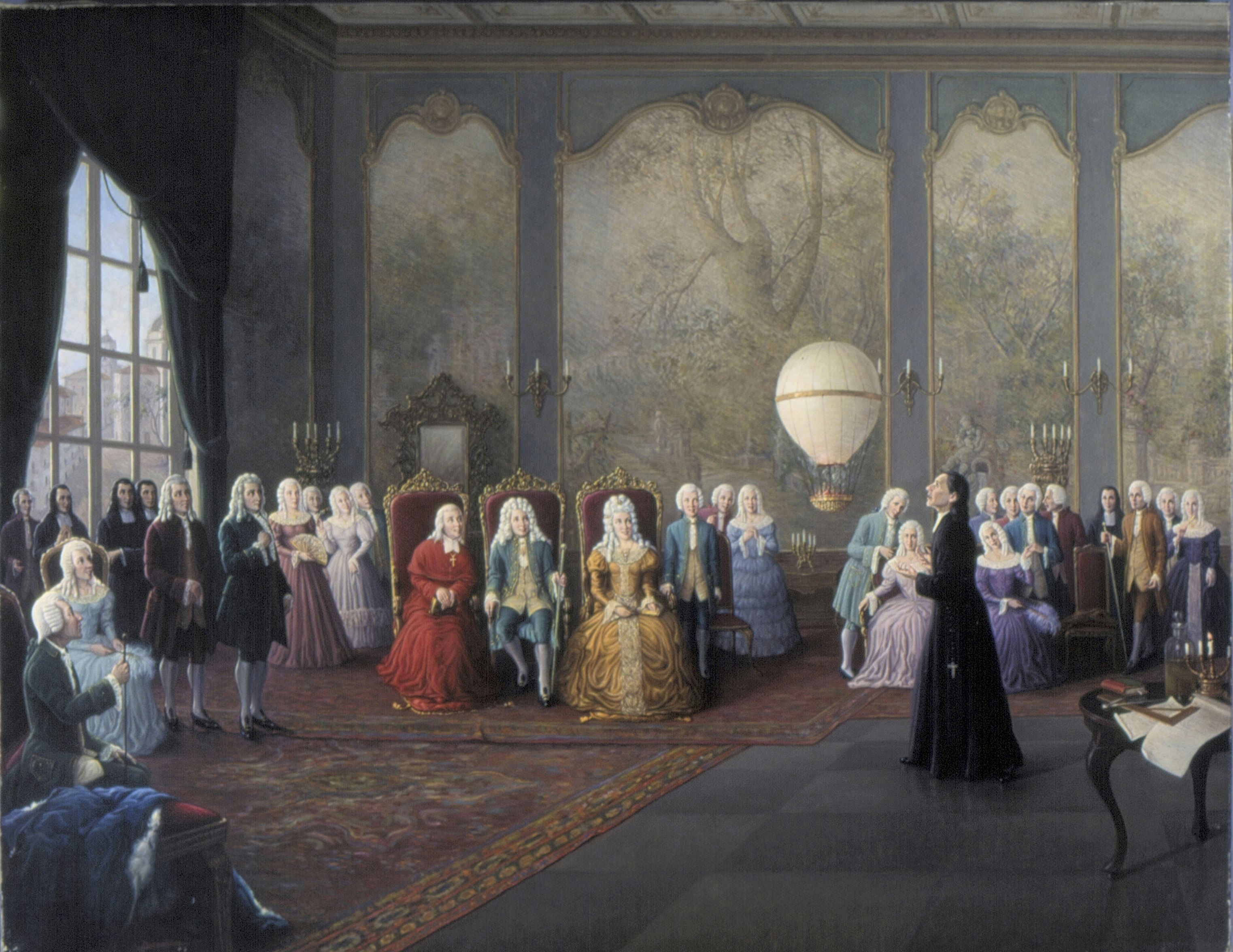
Bartolomeu de Gusmão presenting his invention to the court of John V of Portugal.

A royal court, often called simply a court when the royal context is clear, is an extended royal household in a monarchy, including all those who would regularly attend on a monarch, or another central figure. Hence, the word court may also be applied to the coterie of a senior member of the nobility. Royal courts may have their seat in a designated place, several specific places, or be a mobile, itinerant court.

In the largest courts, the royal households, many thousands of individuals constituted the court. These courtiers included the monarch or noble's camarilla and retinue, household, nobility, clergy, those with court appointments, bodyguards, and may also include emissaries from other kingdoms or visitors to the court. Foreign princes and foreign nobility in exile may also seek refuge at a court.

Courts across Asia often included a harem and concubines as well as eunuchs who fulfilled a variety of functions. At times, the harem was walled off and separate from the rest of the residence of the monarch. In Asia, concubines were often a more visible part of the court. Lower ranking servants and bodyguards were not properly called courtiers, though they might be included as part of the court or royal household in the broadest definition. Entertainers and others may have been counted as part of the court.

== Patronage and courtly culture ==
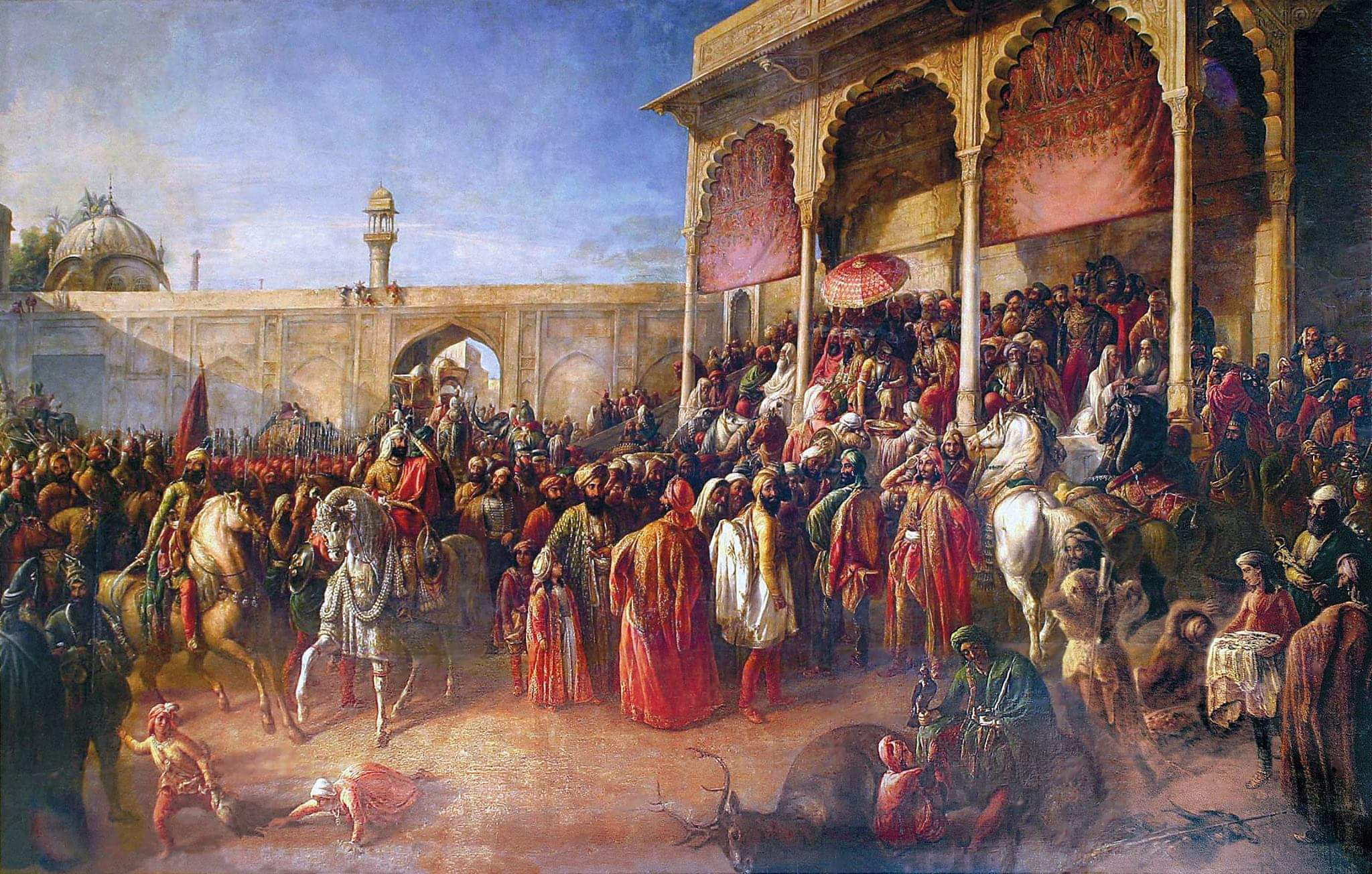
The Sikh 'Court of Lahore'.

A royal household is the highest-ranking example of patronage. A regent or viceroy may hold court during the minority or absence of the hereditary ruler, and even an elected head of state may develop a court-like entourage of unofficial, personally-chosen advisers and "companions". The French word compagnon and its English derivation "companion" literally mean a "sharer of the bread" at table, and a court is an extension of the great individual's household. Wherever members of the household and bureaucrats of the administration overlap in personnel, it is reasonable to speak of a "court", for example in Achaemenid Persia, Ming China, Norman Sicily, the papacy before 1870 (see: papal household), and the Austro-Hungarian Empire. A group of individuals dependent on the patronage of a great man, classically in ancient Rome, forms part of the system of "clientage" that is discussed under vassal.

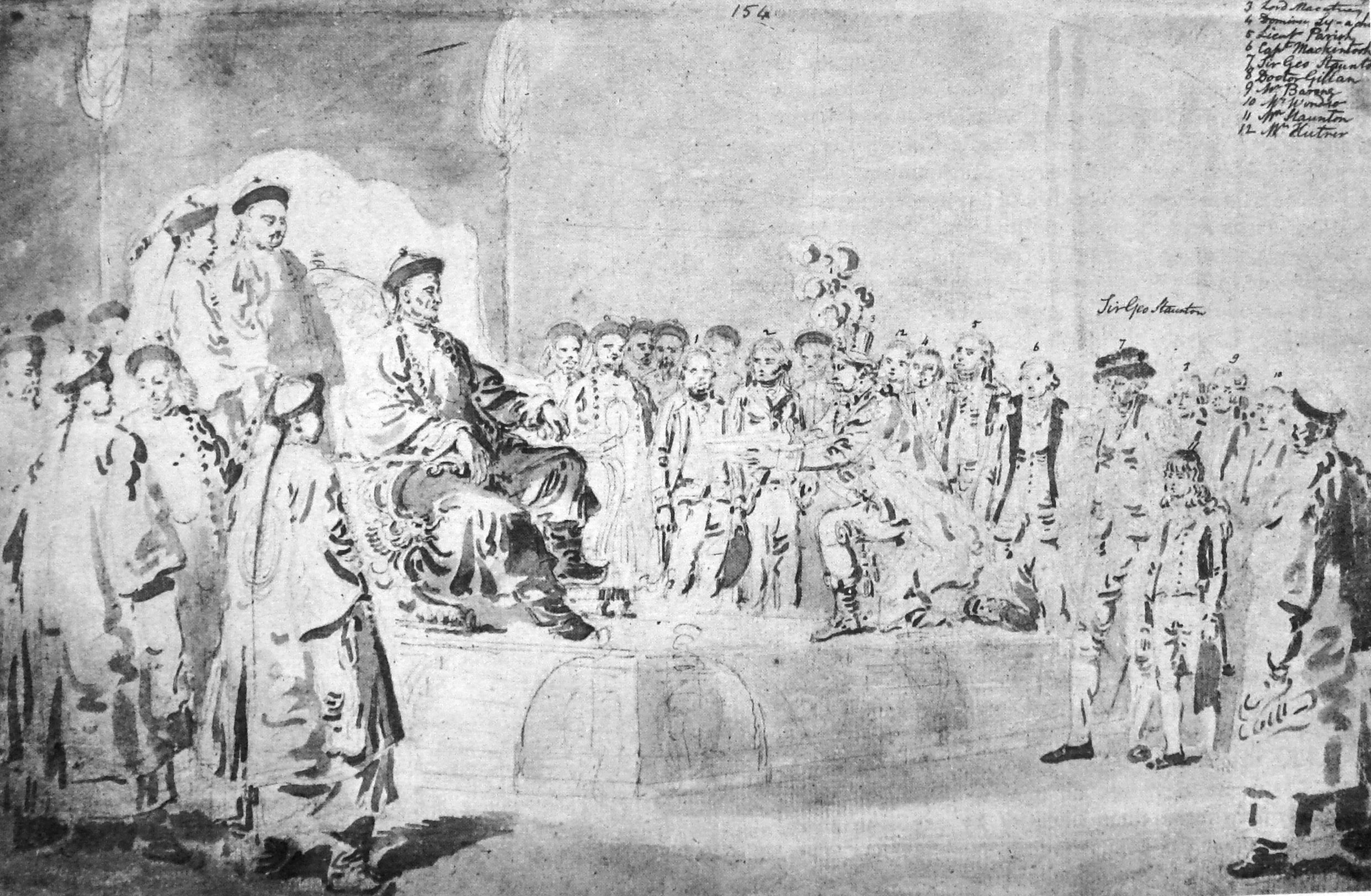
The Macartney Embassy. Lord Macartney salutes the Qianlong Emperor, but refuses to kowtow.

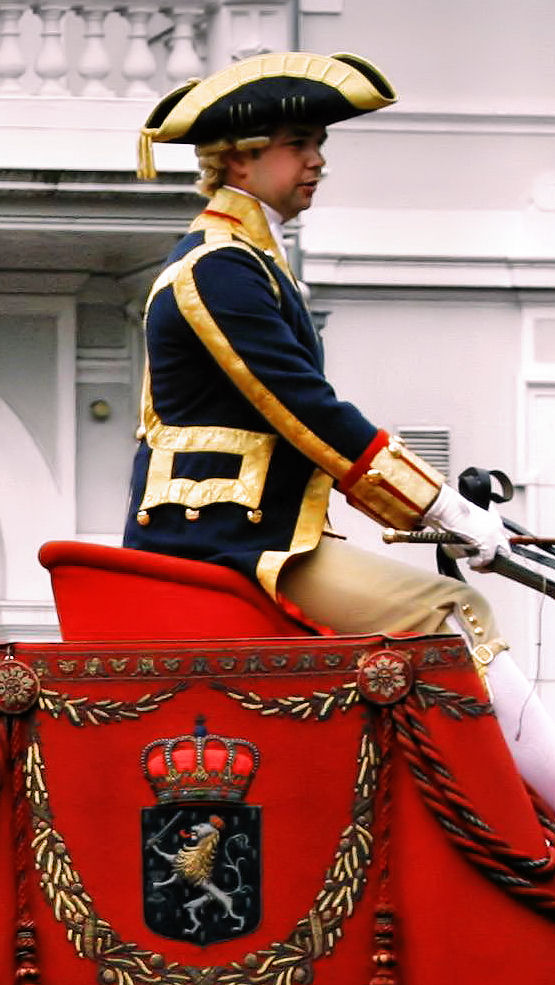
The Dutch court is known for old traditions.

Individual rulers differed greatly in tastes and interests, as well as in political skills and in constitutional situations. Accordingly, some founded elaborate courts based on new palaces, only to have their successors retreat to remote castles or to practical administrative centers. Personal retreats might arise far away from official court centres.

Etiquette and hierarchy flourish in highly structured court settings, and may leave conservative traces over generations. Most courts featured a strict order of precedence, often involving imperial, royal and noble ranks, orders of chivalry, and nobility. Some courts even featured court uniforms. One of the major markers of a court is ceremony. Most monarchal courts included ceremonies concerning the investiture or coronation of the monarch and audiences with the monarch. Some courts had ceremonies around the waking and the sleeping of the monarch, called a levée. Orders of chivalry as honorific orders became an important part of court culture starting in the 15th century. They were the right of the monarch, as the fount of honour, to create and grant.

== History ==
=== Early history ===
The earliest developed courts were probably in the Akkadian Empire, ancient Egypt, and Shang dynasty. However, there is evidence of courts as described in the Neo-Assyrian Empire and Zhou dynasty. Two of the earliest titles referring to the concept of a courtier were likely the ša rēsi and mazzāz pāni of the Neo-Assyrian Empire. In Ancient Egypt, there is a title translated as high steward or great overseer of the house. The royal courts influenced by the court of the Neo-Assyrian Empire such as those of the Median kingdom and the Achaemenid Empire would also have identifiable developed courts with court appointments and other features associated with later courts.

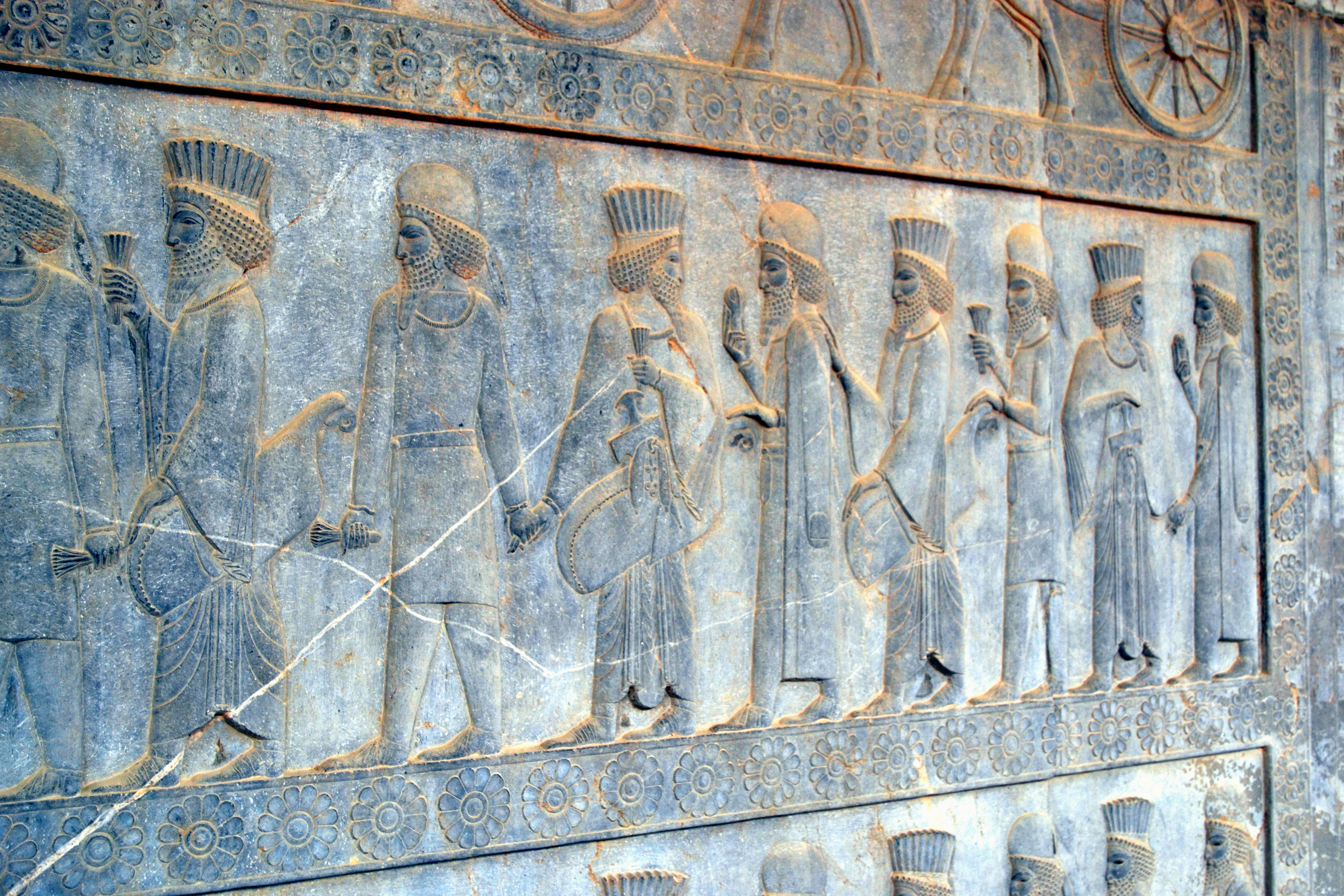
One of the series of the reliefs of the Persian and Median dignitaries at Apadana stairs of Persepolis, all with weapons, but in a casual air—a rare depiction of an ancient court ceremony.

The imperial court of the Achaemenid Empire at Persepolis and Pasargadae is the earliest identifiable complex court with all of the definitive features of a royal court such as a household, court appointments, courtiers, and court ceremony. Though Alexander the Great had an entourage and the rudimentary elements of a court, it was not until after he conquered Persia that he took many of the more complex Achaemenid court customs back to the Kingdom of Macedonia, developing a royal court that would later influence the courts of Hellenistic Greece and the Roman Empire.

The Sasanian Empire adopting and developing the earlier court culture and customs of the Achaemenid Empire would also influence again the development of the complex court and court customs of the Roman Empire and Byzantine Empire.

The imperial court of the Byzantine Empire at Constantinople would eventually contain at least a thousand courtiers. The court's systems became prevalent in other courts such as those in the Balkan states, the Ottoman Empire, and Russia. Byzantinism is a term that was coined for this spread of the Byzantine system in the 19th century.

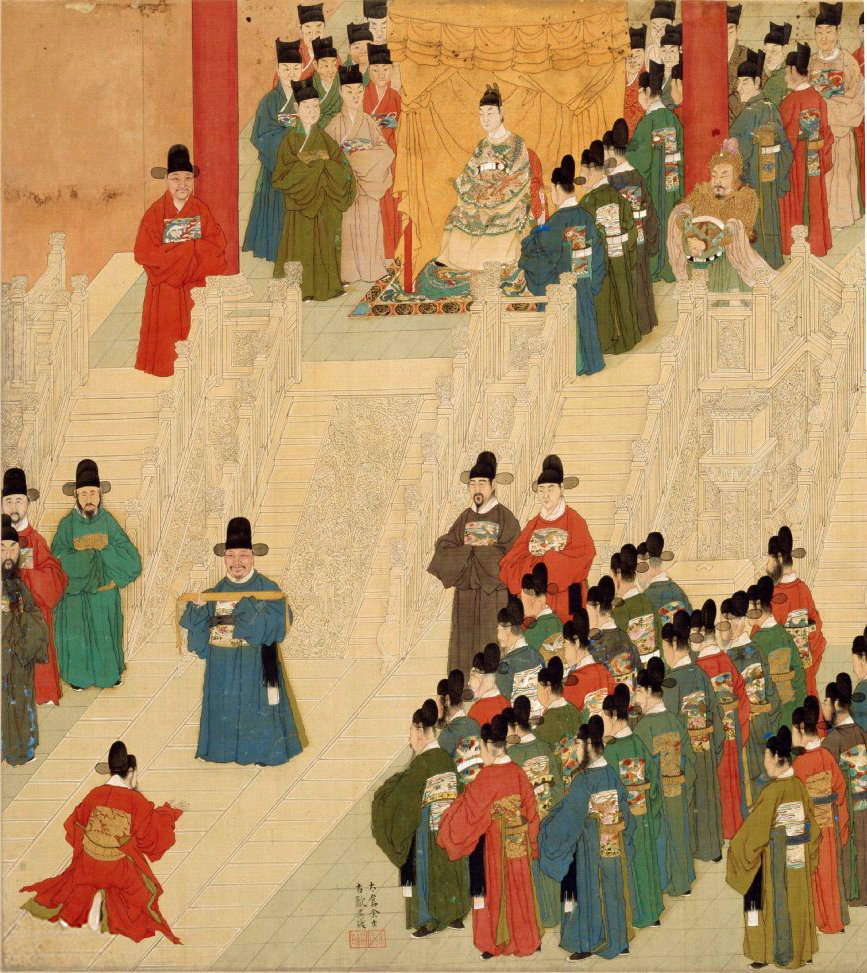
Imperial court conference, Ming dynasty

=== East Asia ===
The imperial courts of Chinese emperors, known as cháotíng (朝廷), were among the largest and most complex of all. The Han dynasty, Western Jin dynasty, and Tang dynasty occupied the large palace complex at Weiyang Palace located near Chang'an, and the later Ming dynasty and Qing dynasty occupied the whole Forbidden City and other parts of Beijing, the present capital city of China. By the Sui dynasty, the functions of the imperial household and the imperial government were clearly divided.

During the Heian period, Japanese emperors and their families developed an exquisitely refined court that played an important role in their culture.

=== Medieval and modern Europe ===
After the collapse of the Roman Empire in the West, a true court culture can be recognised in the entourage of the Ostrogoth Theodoric the Great and in the court of Charlemagne. In the Roman East, a brilliant court continued to surround the Byzantine emperors.

In Western Europe, consolidation of power of local magnates and of kings in fixed administrative centres from the mid-13th century led to the creation of a distinct court culture that was the centre of intellectual and artistic patronage rivaling the abbots and bishops, in addition to its role as the apex of a rudimentary political bureaucracy that rivaled the courts of counts and dukes. The dynamics of hierarchy welded the court cultures together. Many early courts in Western Europe were itinerant courts that traveled from place to place.

Local courts proliferated in the splintered polities of medieval Europe and remained in early modern times in Germany and in Italy. Such courts became known for intrigue and power politics; some also gained prominence as centres and collective patrons of art and culture. In medieval Spain (Castile), provincial courts were created. Minor noblemen and burguesie allied to create a system to oppose the monarchy on many policy issues. They were called "las Cortes de Castilla". These courts are the root of the current Spanish congress and senate.

The courts of Valois Burgundy and the Kingdom of Portugal were particularly influential over the development of court culture and pageantry in Europe. The court of Philip the Good, Duke of Burgundy was considered one of the most splendid in Europe and would influence the development of court life later on for all of France and Europe. Later, Aliénor de Poitiers of the Burgundian court would write one of the seminal books on court etiquette, Les honneurs de la cour (Honours of the Court).

Court life would reach its apogee of culture, complexity and etiquette at the courts of Versailles under Louis XIV of France and the Hofburg under the Habsburgs.

As political executive functions are assumed by democratic or republican institutions, the function of noble courts is reduced once more to that of noble households, concentrating on personal service to the household head, ceremonial and perhaps some residual politico-advisory functions. If republican zeal has banished an area's erstwhile ruling nobility, courts may survive in exile. Traces of royal court practices remain in present-day institutions like privy councils and governmental cabinets.

=== Africa ===
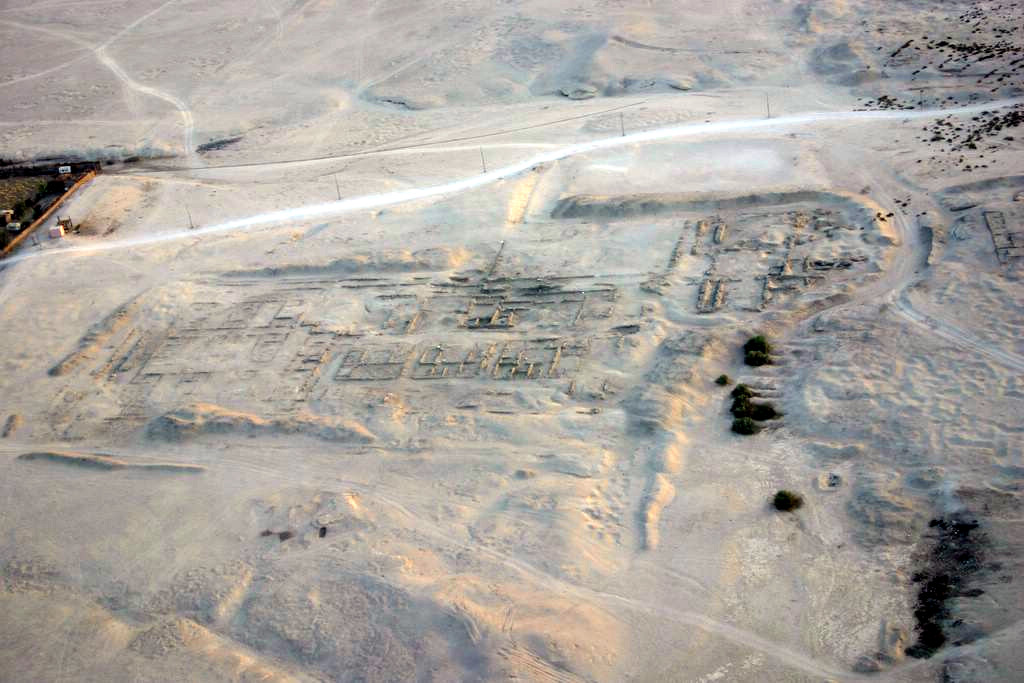
Malkata, the palace of pharaoh Amenhotep III at Thebes

A series of Pharaohs ruled ancient Egypt over the course of three millennia (c. 3150 BC to 31 BC), until it was conquered by the Roman Empire. In the same time period several kingdoms with their own royal courts flourished in the nearby Nubia region, with at least one of them, that of the so-called A-Group culture, apparently influencing the customs of Egypt itself. From the 6th to 19th centuries, Egypt was variously part of the Byzantine Empire, Islamic Caliphate, Mamluk Sultanate, Ottoman Empire, and British Empire with a distant monarch. The Sultanate of Egypt was a short lived protectorate of the United Kingdom from 1914 until 1922, when it became the Kingdom of Egypt and Sultan Fuad I changed his title to King. After the Egyptian Revolution of 1952 the monarchy was dissolved and Egypt became a republic.

In the Horn of Africa, the Kingdom of Aksum and later the Zagwe dynasty, Ethiopian Empire (1270–1974), and Aussa Sultanate all had royal courts. Various Somali Sultanates also existed, including the Adal Sultanate (led by the Walashma dynasty of the Ifat Sultanate), Sultanate of Mogadishu, Ajuran Sultanate, Warsangali Sultanate, Geledi Sultanate, Majeerteen Sultanate, and Sultanate of Hobyo.

The kingship system has been an integral part of the more centralised African societies for millennia. This is especially true in the West African Sahel, where royal courts have been in existence since at least the era of the 9th-century Takrur and Ghana Empires. The ruler of the 13th-century Mali Empire, Mansa Musa, brought a large number of his courtiers with him on the Islamic Hajj pilgrimage to Mecca. Today, the courts of the Ashanti nanas in modern Ghana, the Mande members of the Tunkalemmu caste in Mali, the Bamum sultans of Cameroon, the Kanem shaykhs of Chad, the Hausa emirs of northern Nigeria, the inkosis of the Southern African Zulus and Xhosas, and the obas and baales of Yorubaland, amongst others, continue the pageantry and court lifestyle traditions once common to the continent.

== Court structure and organization ==
=== Court officials ===
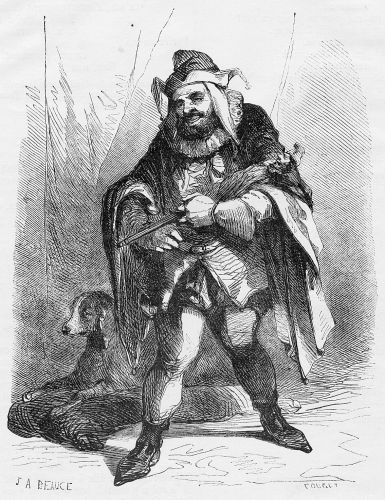
"Triboulet", illustration for the theater play "Le Roi S'Amuse" ("The King Takes His Amusement") by Victor Hugo. Gravure by J. A. Beaucé (1818–1875) and Georges Rouget (1781–1869).

Court officials or office-bearers (one type of courtier) derived their positions and retained their titles from their original duties within the courtly household. With time, such duties often became archaic. However, titles survived involving the ghosts of arcane duties. These styles generally dated back to the days when a noble household had practical and mundane concerns as well as high politics and culture. Such court appointments each have their own histories. They might include but are not limited to:

- Almoner
- Butler
- Chamberlain
- Chancellor
- Chapelmaster
- Chaplain
- Cofferer
- Confessor
- Constable
- Cup-bearer
- Dapifer
- Doorward
- Eunuch
- Falconer
- Gentleman of the Bedchamber
- Gentleman Usher
- Grandmaster
- Great officers
- Groom of the Stool
- Herald
- Intendant
- Royal fool
- Keeper of the seal
- King of arms
- Knight/Earl Marshal
- Lady-in-waiting
- Maid of Honour
- Majordomo
- Master of Ceremonies
- Master of the Horse
- Master of the Hunt
- Page
- Panter or Grand Panetier
- Pursuivant
- Secretary
- Seneschal
- Stolnik
- Standard bearer
- Steward

=== Court seats ===
Earlier courts in medieval Western Europe were itinerant courts, but courts were often held in a fixed place. One of the criteria of Norbert Elias' concept of a court society is that it existed in space. The German word Hof, meaning an enclosed courtyard, can also apply to a rural farmstead with outbuildings and walls forming the perimeter. It has also been used for the palatial seat where the court was held. Thus Hof or "court" can become transferred to the building itself. For example, the grand residence Hampton Court Palace on the River Thames above London was where Thomas Wolsey held court as Catholic cardinal (built after the Italian ideal for a cardinal's palace) until his fall and its confiscation by Henry VIII. William III and Mary II also held court there, 1689–94. Though it is built round two main courts, the structure itself is no longer the seat of a court in the sense of this article.

As an example, ambassadors to the United Kingdom are still accredited to the Court of St James's, and courtiers of the monarchy may still have offices in St James's Palace, London. The present monarch, however, holds court at Buckingham Palace, where dignitaries are received.

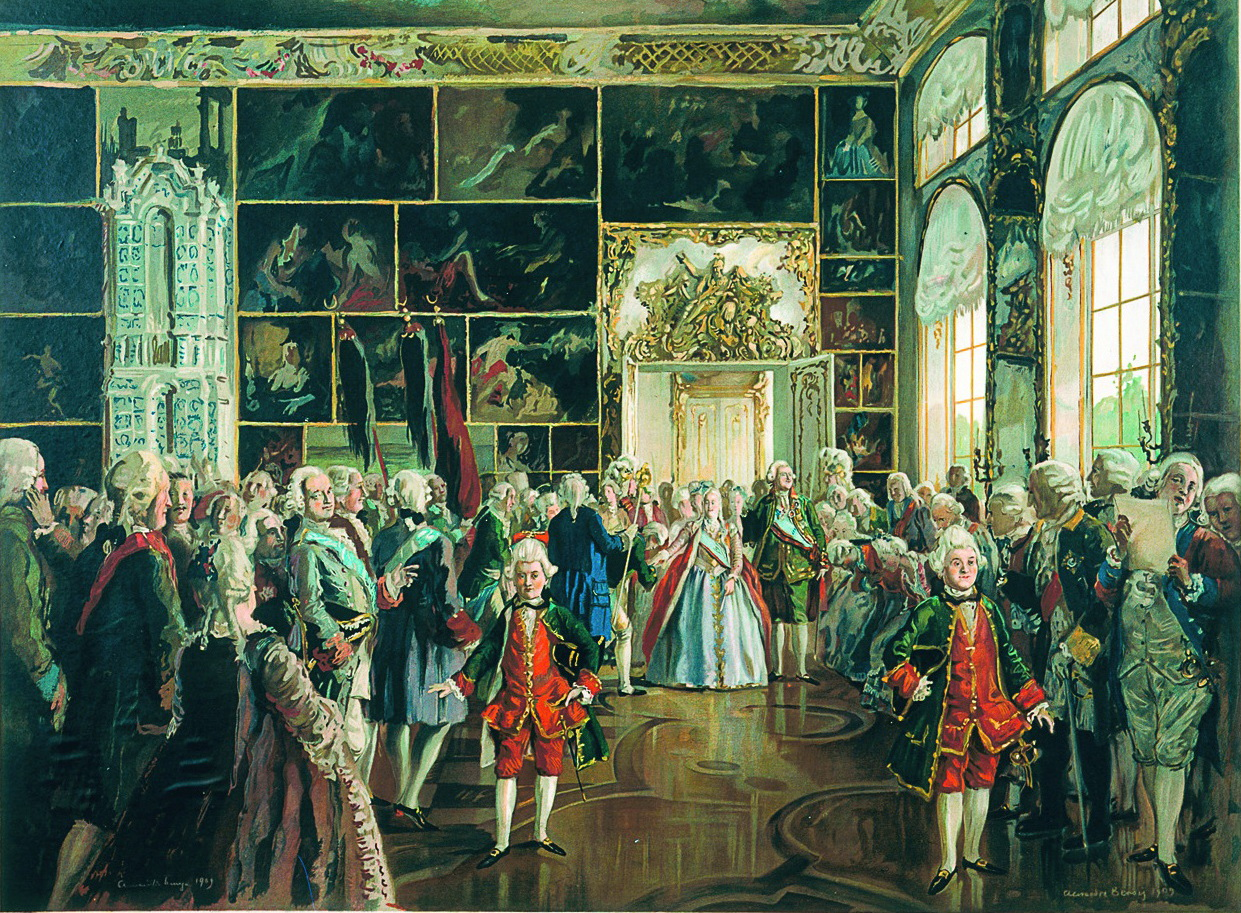
Catherine the Great and her court

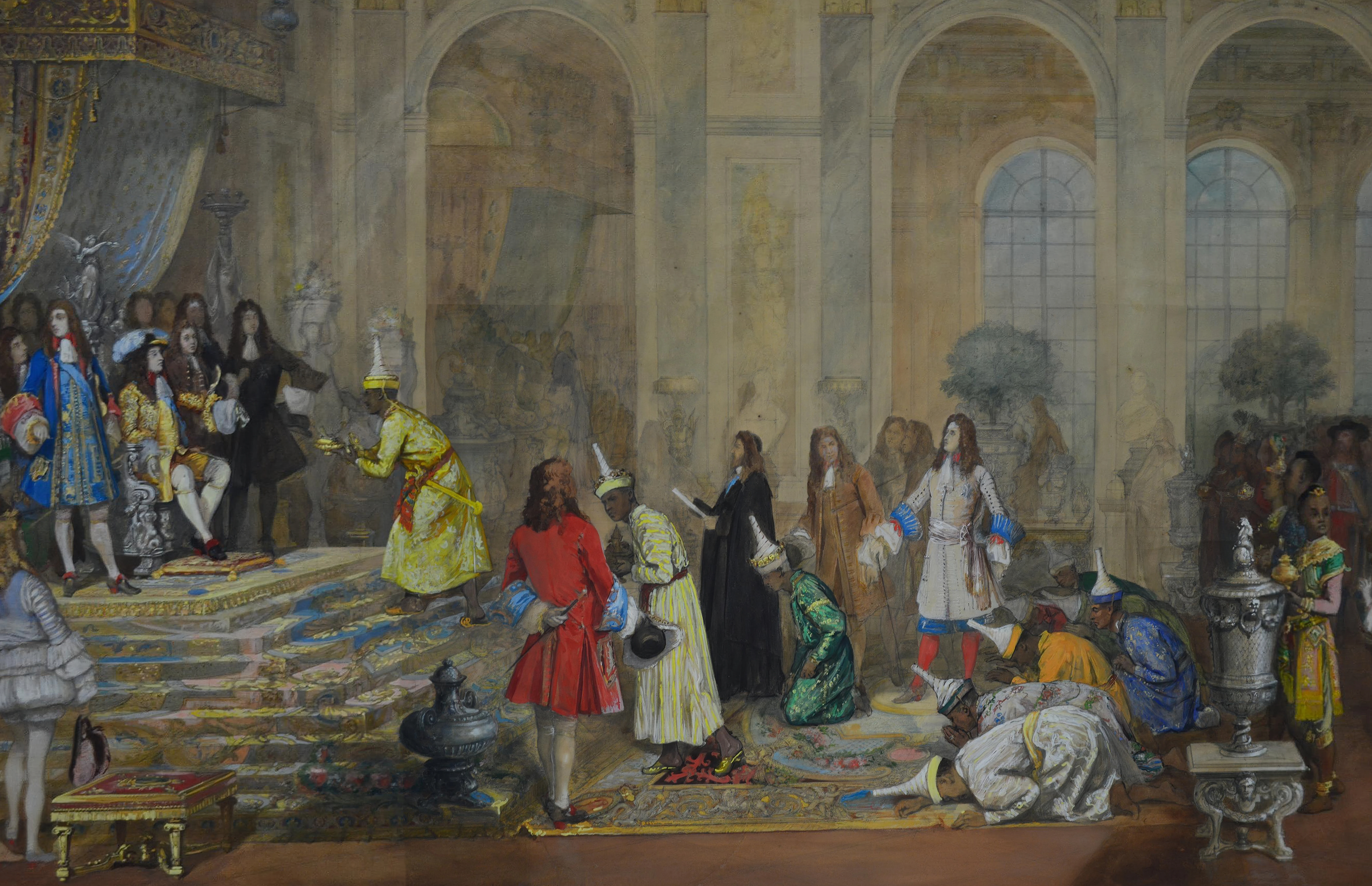
Ambassador Kosa Pan and Siamese envoys pay their respect to Louis XIV at his court in Versailles.

Some former seats of power (see official residence):

- The Haute Cour (High Court) was the feudal council of the Kingdom of Jerusalem.
- Alhambra in Granada, seat of the last Muslim dynasty in current Spain
- Ali Qapu Palace, imperial palace of the later Safavid emperors in Isfahan, Iran.
- The Forbidden City, imperial palace complex of the Ming and Qing dynasties walled off from Beijing
- Gyeongbokgung, royal palace of the Joseon dynasty in Seoul
- Wawel Castle in Kraków and Warsaw Royal Castle, Poland
- Château de Versailles near Paris in France
- Palace of Darius in Susa and Persepolis, imperial Achaemenid palaces
- Taq Kasra in Ctesiphon, imperial Sasanian palace
- Hofburg Palace in Vienna, Austria
- Palatine Hill in Rome, Italy. Origin of the word palace.
- Sanssouci in Potsdam near Berlin
- Munich Residence in Munich in Bavaria
- Ludwigsburg Palace in Ludwigsburg in Swabia
- Dresden Castle in Dresden in Saxony
- The Vatican in the Papal States
- Palazzo Medici Riccardi, palace of the House of Medici, Grand Dukes of Tuscany
- The Kingdom of Portugal
  - The Royal Alcáçova of Coimbra – under the House of Burgundy
  - The Royal Alcáçova of São Jorge, Lisbon – under the houses of Burgundy and Aviz
  - The Royal Palace of Évora – under the reign of Manuel I of Portugal
  - The Royal Palace of Sintra – under the reigns of Manuel I of Portugal and John III of Portugal
  - The Palaces of Ribeira, Lisbon – under the Houses of Aviz, Habsburg, and Braganza
  - The Palace of Ajuda, Lisbon – under the House of Braganza
- Urbino, seat of a duchy in the Marche
- The Red Fort, palatial fortress of the Mughal emperors in Delhi, India
- Shaniwar Wada palace fort of the Maratha Peshwas in Pune, India
- Great Palace of Constantinople in Constantinople
- Topkapı Palace in Istanbul, Turkey – under the Ottoman dynasty
- Winter Palace in Saint Petersburg, Russia
- Royal Palace of Madrid in Spain
- Alcázar de Colón in Santo Domingo

=== Court structure and titles ===
- Byzantine aristocracy and bureaucracy in the Byzantine Empire
- Durbar in Northern India
- Ethiopian aristocratic and court titles
- Government of the Han dynasty
- Imperial Household Agency in Japan
- Itinerant court in European kingdoms in the Early Middle Ages.
- Maison du Roi in France during the Ancien Régime
- Ministry of the Imperial Court in Imperial Russia
- Papal Court of the Holy See
- Royal court of the Sasanian Empire
- Royal Court of Sweden in Sweden
- Royal Household and Heritage of the Crown of Spain in Spain
- Royal Households of the United Kingdom in the United Kingdom
- Titles of the Welsh Court in Wales during the Middle Ages

=== Caliphate courts ===
All four major Caliphates had sophisticated courts; this enabled Cordoba, Cairo and Baghdad (the respective seats of the Umayyads, the Fatimids, and the Abbasids) to become the largest, most culturally developed cities of their time. This drew talented people from all walks of life—such as musicians, singers, poets, and scientists—to seek employment under the patronage of elite bureaucrats, emirs, and sultans at court. The other Caliphate was the Ottoman Empire, which employed its court's culture to stabilize an empire inhabited by huge non-Islamic populations spanning three continents. Everything from Algeria to the Balkans to Yemen was controlled by the court in Istanbul.

The royal courts in the Islamic world were mostly run by rulers, but there were the exceptions of important elite families such as Barmakids and Nizams who established their own minor courts, enabling them to encourage arts and improve the empire even if the ruling king was useless.

== See also ==
- Aliénor de Poitiers, who documented the etiquette of the Burgundian Court in the late 15th century
- Court appointment
- Courtesy book
- Curia regis
- Masque
- Orda (organization), the nomadic court of the Turkic and Mongol peoples
- Striking in the King's Court

== Bibliography ==
- Elias, Norbert (1983) [1969]. The Court Society [Die höfische Gesellschaft]. trans. Edmund Jephcott. Oxford. On the sociology of the court, originally completed in 1939.
- Fox, Robin Lane (1973). Alexander the Great.
