= Incivility =

Social behaviour lacking in civility or good manners

Incivility is a term used to describe social behavior that is characterized by a lack of civility or good manners. This behavior can range from rudeness or a lack of respect for elders, to vandalism and hooliganism, as well as public drunkenness and threatening behaviour. The term "incivility" is derived from the Latin word incivilis, which means "not of a citizen".

The distinction between plain rudeness, and perceived incivility as threat, will depend on some notion of civility as structural to society. Incivility, as anything more ominous than bad manners, is therefore dependent on appeal to notions like its antagonism to the complex concepts of civic virtue or civil society. This phenomenon has become a contemporary political issue in a number of countries.

== Uncivil communication ==
Civil behavior requires that people communicate with respect, restraint, and responsibility, and uncivil communication occurs when people fail to do so. Universal pragmatics, a term coined by Jürgen Habermas, suggests that human conflict arises from miscommunication, so communicative competence is needed to reduce conflict. Communication competence "involves the ability to communicate in such a way that: (1) the truth claim of an utterance is shared by both speaker and hearer; (2) the hearer is led to understand and accept the speaker’s intention; and (3) the speaker adapts to the hearer’s world view." If people disagree about the truth or appropriateness of their interaction, conflict will occur.

According to Habermas, we should establish communicative norms that lead to rational conversations by creating the social coordination needed for interactants to pursue their goals while recognizing the truth or appropriateness of their interaction. Such norms, or social rules, include: "all participants must be allowed to speak freely, all participants must be allowed to speak for themselves (to enable them to establish their own ethos or "selfhood"), and that communication should be equal, with no one participant commanding more attention from the others than is afforded to them on their turn."

Some examples of uncivil communication include rude gestures, vulgar language, interrupting, and loudly having private discussions in public spaces. Recent poll data suggests that Americans believe uncivil communication is a serious problem, and believe it has led to an increase in physical violence. The 2013 study on Civility in America: A Nationwide Survey, conducted by global public relations firm Weber Shandwick and public affairs firm Powell Tate in partnership with KRC Research found that 70 percent of Americans believe incivility has reached crisis proportions. Of those who expect civility to worsen, 34 percent blame Twitter. The study found that Americans encounter incivility, on average, 17.1 times per week, or 2.4 times per day. Some studies suggest that uncivil communication may have real consequences, including increased health problems due to stress, decreased work productivity, more auto accidents caused by aggressive driving, and vandalism.

== Political incivility ==
Political incivility is different from the everyday incivility described above. According to face negotiation theory, politeness norms require us to avoid challenging others, but political incivility is different because, since it is specific to the political sphere, contestation of views and confrontation are required for a democracy to occur. According to Thomas Benson, "Where there is disagreement, there is a risk of incivility; in many cases, incivility is itself a tactic in political discourse, employed as an indicator of sincerity, as the marker of the high stakes in a disagreement."

Civil discourse is "the free and respectful exchange of different ideas". Eight out of 10 Americans believe that the lack of civil discourse in the political system is a serious problem. Eighty-two percent of American respondents to a 2011 survey felt that political advertisements were too "nasty" and 72 percent believed that political commercials that attacked the opponent were "inappropriate". Research has linked political incivility to reduced trust in the legitimacy of political candidates, political polarization, and policy gridlock. Campaigns and politicians are not the only avenues for incivility, however. The public also participates in civil discourse, and incivility. Incivility in these contexts can lead to the breakdown of political discourse, and exclude certain people or groups from the discussion. If people or groups are systematically excluded from the discussion, the democratic nature of that discussion is called into question.

In his article The Public Sphere: An Encyclopedia Article (1964), Habermas explains that the public sphere is "a realm of our social life in which something approaching public opinion can be formed… Although state authority is so to speak the executor of the political public sphere, it is not a part of it." Political incivility threatens the features of the rhetorical model of the public sphere, which include:

1. It is discourse-based as opposed to class-based.
2. Norm of reasonableness, meaning the success of an argument depends on participants agreeing that it makes sense.
3. It "emphasizes indeterminate bracketing of discursive exchanges", meaning the public sphere is made up of many smaller conversations that happen independently of each other.
4. Values communication that leads to shared judgments.

Political incivility threatens the future of the rhetorical model of the public sphere because it fractures that sphere into counter-publics, which may or may not interact with each other. According to Papacharissi (2004), "Incivility can then be operationalized as the set of behaviors that threaten democracy, deny people their personal freedoms, and stereotype social groups.", all of which could result from the violation of the features of the rhetorical model of the public sphere. People or groups may be systematically shut out of the mainstream political discourse, which makes that discourse less democratic, as certain voices are then missing from that discourse. Examples of incivility in political discourse include, but are not limited to, name calling, derisive or disrespectful speech and vulgarity, intentional lies, and misrepresentation. Another type of uncivil behavior is "outrage speech", which includes name calling, insulting, character assassination, mockery, and emotional displays. There are disagreements among researchers about whether or not emotional speech – using anger, fear, or hatred – should be considered uncivil. Some researchers view some emotional speech as civil unless it threatens democracy in some way, while other researchers view emotional speech itself as a disruption to democracy, and push for a purely rational view of civility.

Stryker et al. assert that "political incivility is usefully distinguished from interpersonal politeness outside of politics." Their research found consensus among survey respondents concerning the types of political speech and behavior that "count" as "political incivility". Papacharissi echoes this sentiment, stating that "civility should be redefined as a construct that encompasses, but also goes beyond, politeness."

== Workplace incivility ==
A 2011 report in USA Today defined workplace incivility as "a form of organizational deviance... characterized by low-intensity behaviors that violate respectful workplace norms, appearing vague as to intent to harm." Researchers had announced at the annual meeting of the American Psychological Association that "Workplace incivility is on the rise. Uncivil behaviors are characteristically rude and discourteous, displaying a lack of regard for others", which can lead to distress for those experiencing this treatment. Incivility is distinct from violence. Examples of workplace incivility include insulting comments, denigration of the target's work, spreading false rumors, and social isolation. Cortina (2008) conceptualizes incivility that amounts to covert practices of sexism and/or racism in the workplace as selective incivility. For example, Ozturk and Berber (2022) demonstrate significant evidence of subtle racism in UK workplaces, where racialized professionals appear to be the main targets of selective incivility.

== Marketing incivility ==
At one time, a number of automotive audio manufacturers engaged in marketing incivility with their products, which included Sony with its "Disturb The Peace" tagline.

== See also ==
- Abuse
- Anti-social behaviour
- Anti-social behaviour order
- Civic virtue
- Deviance (sociology)
- Folk devil
- Harassment
- Hooliganism
- Juvenile delinquency
- Rules of Civility and Decent Behaviour In Company and Conversation
- Occupational health psychology
- Social undermining
- Street harassment
- Yobbo
- Workplace aggression

== Quotes ==
- "Candor, far from being the enemy of civility, is one of its preconditions." Robert P. George, McCormick Professor of Jurisprudence at Princeton University, 29 May 2009
- "I don't believe in confrontation. That seems to me outside civil discourse and we all have to find way to be civil to one another." Condoleezza Rice, NPR interview, 4 March 2009.
- "... people shouldn't underestimate the value of civility." President Barack Obama
- "There is a toxic nature to Washington that thrives on food fights and thrives on controversy and thrives on people not getting along." Matthew Dowd, Bush's pollster and chief strategist for the 2004 presidential campaign.
- "On both sides of any issue, I'd like to see us increasingly wage ideological battles with words and ideas and not with volume and antics." Mark DeMoss, NPR interview, 12 August 2009.
- "Civility costs nothing and buys everything." Lady Mary Wortley Montagu, 1689–1766
- "It's too much to expect in an academic setting that we should all agree, but it's not too much to expect discipline and unvarying civility." John Howard, Australian statesman
- "Teaching civility is an obligation of the family." Stephen L. Carter
- "The greatest challenge facing contemporary civilization is to bring some peace between our competitive spirit and our need for communal well-being." Benet Davetian
