= Yob Nation =

Book by Francis Gilbert

- Author: Francis Gilbert
- Publication date: March 2006
- ISBN: 9780749951245

Yob Nation (ISBN 9780749951245), by English author Francis Gilbert, is a non-fiction book that studies the yob culture in modern British society and to what degree it is increasing.

First published in March 2006, the book has received distinctly mixed reviews from critics for the way it defines yobs and the way it links everyday thugs to people in the upper echelons of society. Francis Gilbert starts with his own encounters with yobs in his childhood and while working as a teacher, before moving beyond his own experiences to investigate the thuggery and foul behaviour that exist in other parts of the UK.

== See also ==
- I'm a Teacher, Get Me Out of Here
