= Florence Hartley =

Victorian-era writer

Florence Hartley was a Victorian-era writer whose work was meant for women of the era, covering topics of etiquette and needlework. She was also an advocate for women's health.

== Biography ==
Florence Hartley never married. Little else is known about her life, and the place and date of her birth and death are unknown.

== Etiquette ==
Rhetoric theorist Jane Donawerth identifies Hartley's The Ladies’ Book of Etiquette as part of a distinctive self-consciously feminine discursive tradition of conduct book rhetoric, developed in the 18th and 19th centuries. Donawerth sees Hartley's work as marking the conservative end of the spectrum of works within this tradition, merging the conduct book tradition with the narrower tradition of the etiquette manual. Hartley sees good elocution as natural, not as an art, and avoids the use of the word elocution; she discourages women from speaking in such a way as to draw attention to themselves, or asking professional men (such as physicians, attorneys, artists, merchants, or mechanics) about the subject of their work. She advises her audience to “never, when advancing an opinion, assert positively that a thing ’is so,’ but give your opinion as an opinion . . . remember that your companion may be better informed upon the subject under discussion, or, where it is a mere matter of taste or feeling, do not expect that all the world will feel exactly as you do.”

Hartley argues for women's education principally on the ground that it enables women to be better companions. However, she also believed that women should educate themselves on various subjects for their own enjoyment. Donawerth characterizes Hartley's etiquette as grounded in a profoundly conservative worldview based on wealth and social class. Hartley herself sees her etiquette as a logical extension of Christian ethics, especially the Golden Rule.

Hartley's approach to etiquette strongly emphasized its role in hospitality. Of the 26 chapters in The Ladies’ Book of Etiquette, ten are devoted to the etiquette of the roles of guest or hostess. Hartley also placed great emphasis on the etiquette of letter writing.

=== Response ===
==== Nineteenth century ====
During Hartley's time, her work received favorable reviews, such as this one referring to The Ladies’ Book of Etiquette, and Manual of Politeness:

We should despair of any young lady who, having read this volume attentively, was not sufficiently polished to enter the very best society.

— The Crayon (November 1860)

==== Twentieth and twenty-first centuries ====
Present-day reception of Hartley's work has been mixed. Journalist Tanya Sweeney describes The Ladies’ Book of Etiquette as the "definitive tome" of 19th-century etiquette. According to journalist Jessica Leigh Hester, Hartley's 19th-century etiquette advice can still be instructive in the 21st century, particularly in regard to RSVPs, tasteful dress, avoidance of gossip in places where it can easily be overheard, and loud amateur music at parties. On the other hand, food and travel writer Anna Brones ridicules Hartley's dictum that a good hostess should not discuss, or even notice, what her guests are eating. Historian C. Dallett Hemphill sees Hartley's conservative approach to etiquette as having "nativist or racist roots".

Donawerth notes that Hartley never acknowledges the etiquette writers before her. When Hartley tells readers that

politeness is as necessary to a happy intercourse with the inhabitants of the kitchen, as with those of the parlour; it lessens the pains of service, promotes kind feelings on both sides, and checks unbecoming familiarity

she is directly quoting Eliza Ware Farrar's The Young Lady's Friend without credit.

== Needlework ==
Hartley's Ladies’ Hand Book of Fancy and Ornamental Work offered instruction in a wide variety of types of needlework, including sewing, knitting, and quilting. Just as with etiquette, Hartley saw skill in needlework as essential to a lady's education, with implications for her overall happiness and for her usefulness to, and acceptance within, society.

== Women's health ==
Hartley was an advocate of more healthful practices for women, and a critic of social customs that she saw as jeopardizing women's health. Despite the conservatism of her general approach to etiquette, Hartley denounced the corset, which some other early women writers on etiquette defended. She saw young women of her day as less healthy than their mothers and grandmothers. Hartley warned young women against the practice of staying late at dance balls, so that they would not be utterly exhausted when they left, and would not miss breakfast the next morning. She advocated walking 4–5 miles per day for vigorous young women, as an alternative to dancing in overheated ballrooms.

== Works ==
- The Ladies’ Hand Book of Fancy and Ornamental Work (1859)
- The Ladies’ Book of Etiquette, and Manual of Politeness (1860)
