= I'm a Teacher, Get Me Out of Here =

First edition

I'm a Teacher, Get Me Out of Here is a novel by Francis Gilbert. It was first published in hardback, in 2003 by Short Books.

A parody of the TV show I'm a Celebrity...Get Me Out of Here!, it is set around a teacher's trials and tribulations, in an inner city school, from training to teaching. Gilbert bases this book on his own teaching experiences, much of the content being close to fact with only names and locations changed.

The novel was released in paperback in 2005 (ISBN 978-1904095682).

== See also ==
- Yob Nation
