= Etiquette in Myanmar =

The code of etiquette in Myanmar, or the code of social behavior that governs human interactions, is largely derived from Theravada Buddhism and focuses on the core values of this religion. Like many social cultures, etiquette varies greatly depending on one's status relative to the person in question. Some conventions may be very regional practices, and thus may not exist in all regions of Myanmar. Some customs have changed over the course of Burmese history. The following are generally accepted modern customs in Myanmar.

== Cultural overview ==
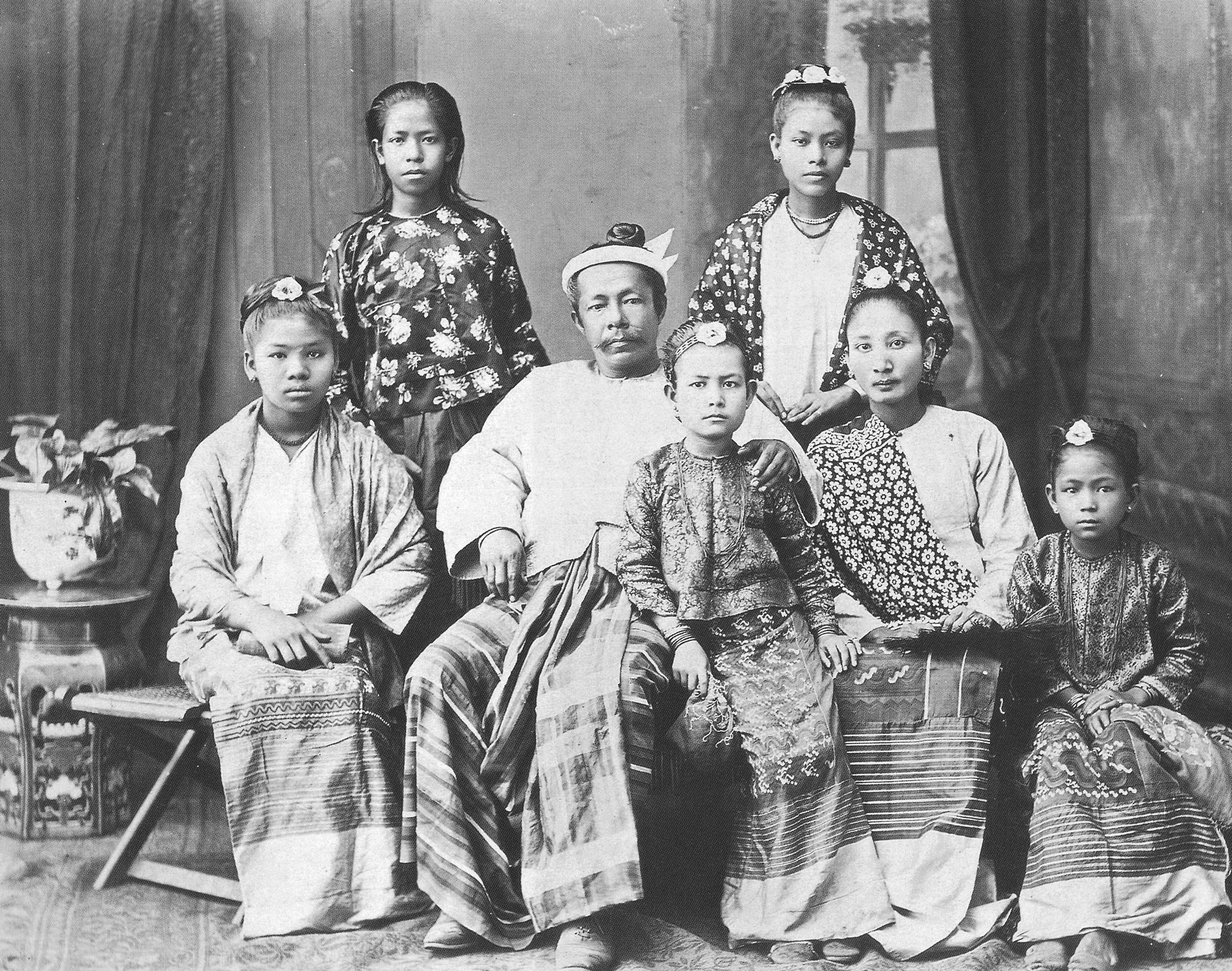
Burmese Family Portrait

Myanmar is a sovereign state located in the Southeast Asian region. Myanmar is bordered by India and Bangladesh to its west, Thailand and Laos to its east and China to its north and northeast. Its capital city is Naypyidaw, and its largest city and former capital is Yangon (Rangoon). Myanmar has been a member of the Association of Southeast Asian Nations (ASEAN) since 1997.

Early civilisations in Myanmar included the Tibeto-Burman-speaking Pyu city-states in Upper Burma and the Mon kingdoms in Lower Burma. In the 9th century, the Bamar people entered the upper Irrawaddy valley and, following the establishment of the Pagan Kingdom in the 1050s, the Burmese language, culture and Theravada Buddhism slowly became dominant in the country. The Pagan Kingdom fell due to the Mongol invasions and several warring states emerged. In the 16th century, reunified by the Taungoo Dynasty, the country was for a brief period the largest empire in the history of Mainland Southeast Asia. The early 19th century Konbaung Dynasty ruled over an area that included modern Myanmar and briefly controlled Manipur and Assam as well. The British took over the administration of Myanmar after three Anglo-Burmese Wars in the 19th century and the country became a British colony. Myanmar was granted independence in 1948, as a democratic nation. Following a coup d'état in 1962, it became a military dictatorship.

Myanmar's recent political history is underlined by its struggle to establish democratic structures amidst conflicting factions. This political transition from a closely held military rule to a free democratic system is widely believed to be determining the future of Myanmar. The resounding victory of Aung San Suu Kyi's National League for Democracy in 2015 general elections has raised hope for a successful culmination of this transition.

== Names ==
=== Addressing others ===
The Myanmar language has various ways to address people of different ranks, ages, and relationships. There are no surnames or first names to properly address a person by. To address a grown person older than oneself, a Burmese person would use "U" for adult males and "Daw" for adult females. For addressing older males or male peers, the title "Ko" is used. "Maung" is used for younger males, and for older females or female peers, "Ma" is used. Senior officials and teachers are addressed as "Saya." This goes back to Buddhist teaching, where parents and teachers are second only to the Three Jewels (ရတနာသုံးပါး yadana thoun ba), together making up the Five Boundless Beneficence (အနန္တငါးပါး ananda nga ba). Using the proper form is an indication to how well bred and correct the speaker is as well as to the status of the individual being addressed.

=== Referring to oneself ===
Personal pronouns in the Burmese language are gendered. A male would refer to himself as "Kyun-daw". A female would refer to herself as "Kyun-ma". When speaking to a monk, proper etiquette demands that one change their personal pronoun to "Da-pyi-daw". When an elder or superior calls a male, the male will respond with "Khin-bya". Likewise, a female would respond with "Shin".

== Religion ==
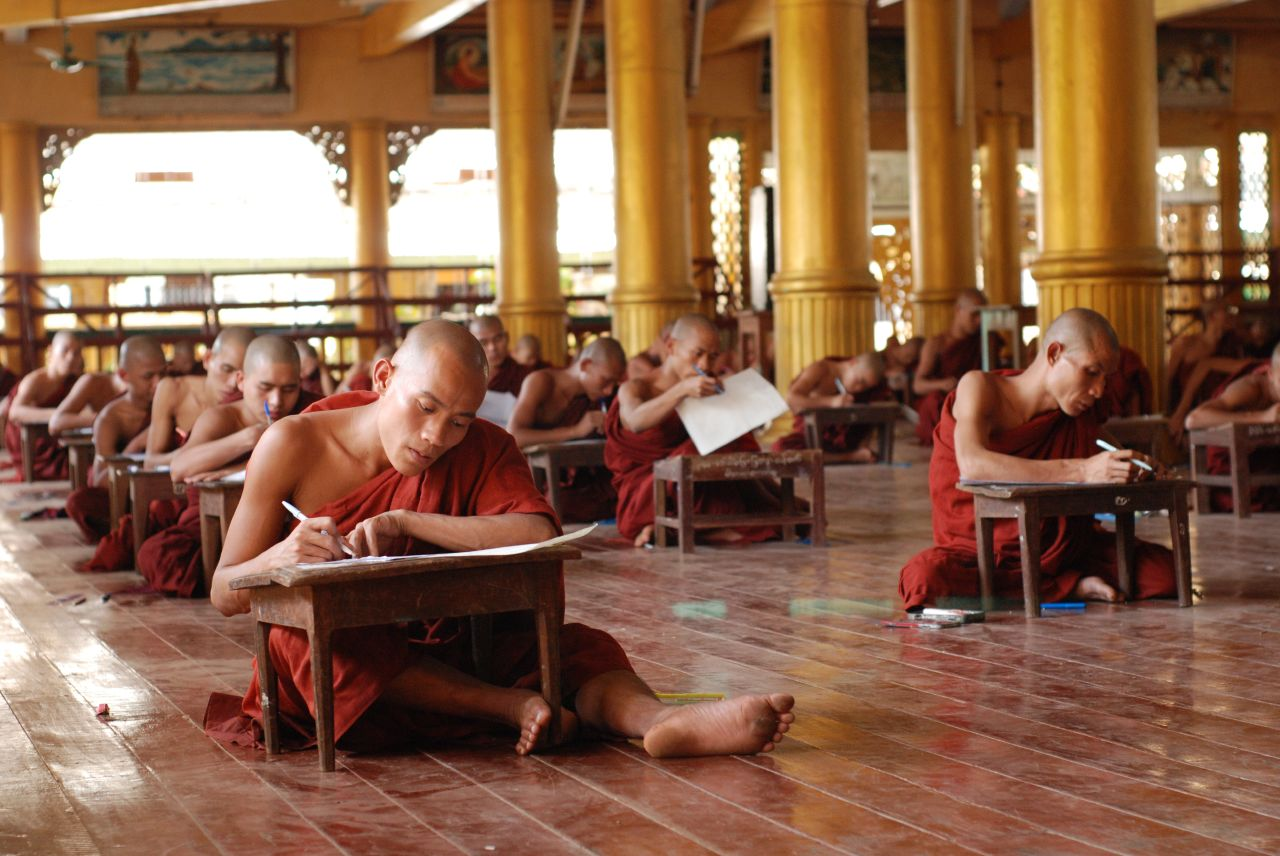
Myanmar Monks

As a predominantly Buddhist country, much deference is given to monks. It is rude to stand on a monk's shadow or point one's feet at a monk. It is also forbidden for a female to touch a monk. Shoes are always taken off upon entering homes, monasteries and pagoda compounds. A custom of the Burmese is to perambulate clockwise (လက်ယာရစ် let ya yit) around a pagoda, not counterclockwise (လက်ဝဲရစ် let wè yit).

== Table manners ==
When dining at home, it is not custom to drink alcoholic beverages with meals. Serving spoons are taken with the left hand. Diners begin to eat only after all of the food has been placed on the table, with the eldest served first. In their absence a spoonful of rice is put aside first in the pot as a token of respect (ဦးချ u cha) before serving the meal. Modern cutlery has become common, though some choose to eat in the traditional way with their fingers.

== Hygiene ==
In Myanmar, the upper parts of the body, especially the head and face, are considered sacred, while the lower parts, especially the feet, are considered dirty. The Burmese separate things used for the face and head from things used for the lower body, such as towels, cleaning basins, and soaps. Furthermore, underwear is not raised above head level, and a woman's lower body clothes, such as the traditional Longyi, are not placed to dry or hang in areas that a male or a monk may pass, such as upper levels of corridors.

Rules of etiquette regarding the feet are numerous. Using the water from a public drinking pot to rinse off one's feet is considered an insult. Feet, no matter how clean, are never placed on bed pillows. It is also considered rude to sit on top of a pillow designated for the head. Gesturing with the feet is also regarded as an insult. The Burmese are careful of which direction their feet point, and take pains not to point their feet towards Buddha's image, elders, or religious sites.

== Business etiquette ==
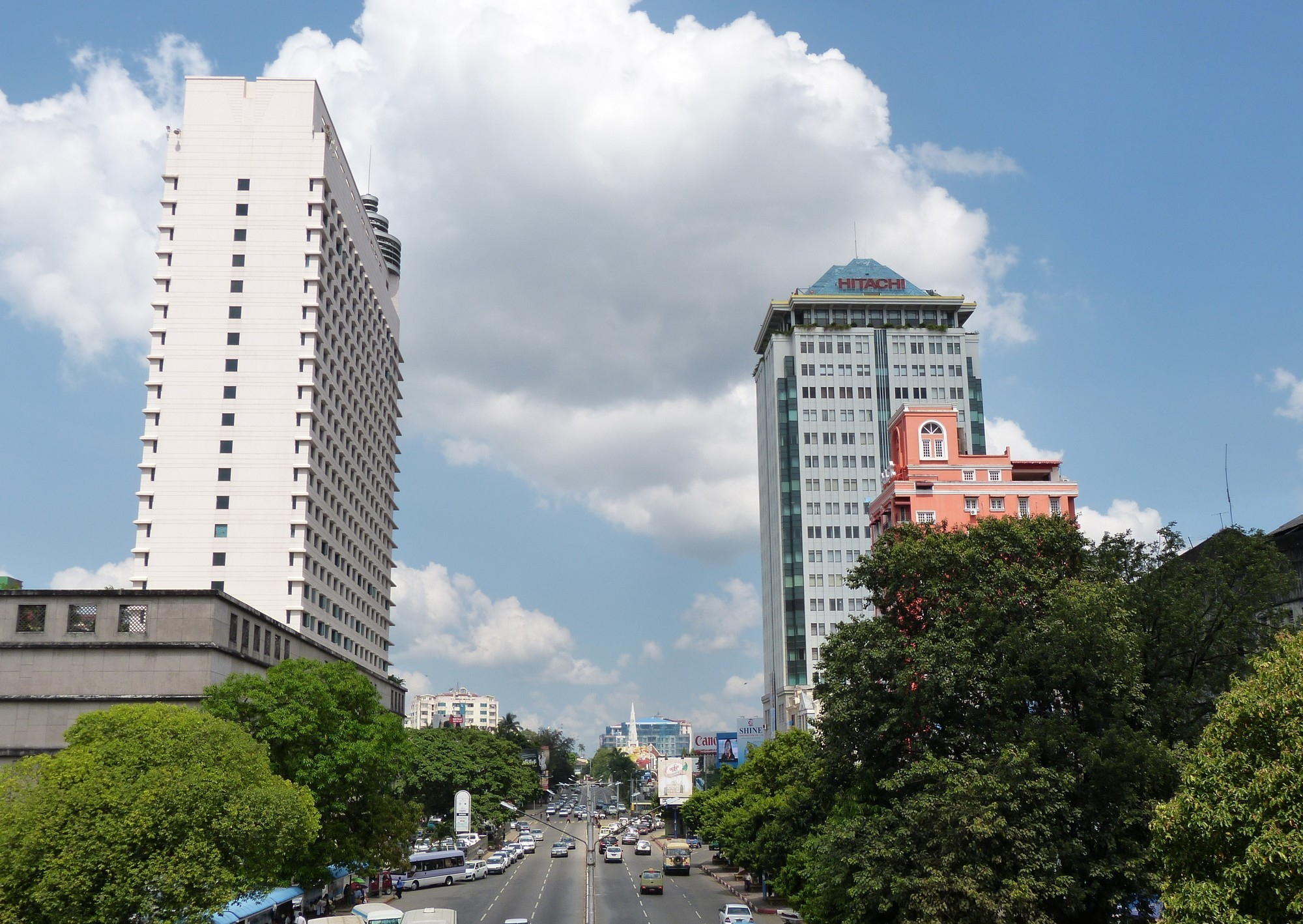
Central Business District in Yangon

Many offices in Myanmar are shoes-free areas. Shoes are worn from the street into public hallways and foyers, but then removed at the door of the office. Hand shakes are common and standard, with both hands being used an acceptable practice. If a businesswoman initiates a handshake, it is acceptable for a male to shake it, but a male would not initiate a handshake with a woman. If a handshake is not initiated by a woman, a male may instead make a small bow.

In an informal market setting haggling is acceptable, though not in shops.

== Ana ==
Burmese society operates on ana (အားနာမှု), a characteristic or feeling that has no English equivalent. It is characterized by a hesitation, reluctance or avoidance, to perform an action based on the fear that it will offend someone or cause someone to lose face or become embarrassed. Also, there is the concept of hpon (ဘုန်း; from Sanskrit bhaga), which translates to "power". It is used as an explanation for the varying degrees of ethnic, socioeconomic, and gender differences between people in a society. Hpon refers to the cumulative result of past deeds, an idea that power or social position comes from merit earned in previous lives. This idea is used to justify the prevalent view that women are lesser than men, who are considered to have more hpon.

== Respect for age ==
Children are taught from young 'to venerate one's elders, to respect one's peers, and to be kind to the young and weak' (ကြီးသူကိုရိုသေ၊ ရွယ်သူကိုလေးစား၊ ငယ်သူကိုသနား။ kyeethu go yothei, ywedu go layza, ngethu go thana). Young people would avoid sitting on a higher level than the elders or passing in front of them unless unavoidable, and then only treading softly with a slight bow. Things would be passed to the elders using both hands together. Men may cross their legs sitting on a chair or a mat but women generally would not. Parents are believed to be solely responsible for their children's behaviour as reflected by the expressions: mi ma hsonma, hpa ma hsonma (မိမဆုံးမ ဖမဆုံးမ undisciplined either by mother or by father) and ami youk tau hnoukkyan, ahpa youk tau ko amu-aya kyan (bad language from bad mother, bad body-language from bad father). Saying "thank you" however is not Burmese custom between friends and within the family.

== Physical touch ==
Physical demonstrations of affection in public are common between friends of the same gender or between members of the family, but seldom seen between lovers. It is thus common to see friends walking together holding hands or with arms round each other, but couples rarely do so, except in major cities.

It is considered rude to touch a person's head, because it is the "highest" point of the body. It is also considered taboo to touch another's feet, but worse still to point with the foot or sit with feet pointing at someone older, because the feet are considered the lowest. Also, pointing a finger at Buddha images is considered blasphemous, although this custom has slowly eroded.
