= Court appointment =

Traditional position in a royal household

Court appointments are the traditional positions within a royal, ducal, or noble household. In the early Middle Ages, when such households were established, most court officials had either domestic or military duties; the monarch's closest advisers were those who served in the household. However, as time went by, most of these positions became hereditary, and their role in the running of the household was gradually eroded. In England, for instance, the Lord Great Chamberlain and the Earl Marshal were originally responsible for the running of the royal household and the royal stables respectively; however, from the late medieval period onwards, their roles became largely honorary, their places in the household being taken by the Lord Chamberlain and the Master of the Horse.

Today, many court titles survive in those European nations that retain royal courts. Examples of court appointments would include:

- Almoner
- Arch-Treasurer
- Butler
- Chamberlain
- Chancellor
- Chancery
- Chapelmaster
- Chaplain
- Cofferer
- Confessor
- Constable
- Cup-bearer
- Director of the Royal Collection
- Doorward
- Eunuch
- Falconer
- Gentleman of the Bedchamber
- Gentleman Usher
- Grand Almoner
- Grandmaster
- Grand Master of the Hunt
- Great officers
- Groom of the Stool
- Herald
- Intendant
- The Royal Fool
- Keeper of the Privy Purse
- Keeper of the seal
- King of arms
- Knight -/ Earl Marshal
- Lady-in-waiting / Lord-in-waiting
- Maid of Honour
- Majordomo
- Marshal
- Master of Ceremonies
- Master of the Horse
- Master of the Household
- Master of the Hunt
- Mayor of the palace
- Page
- Pantler or Grand Panetier
- Proctor
- Secretary
- Pursuivant
- Seneschal
- Serjeant-at-arms
- Stolnik
- Standard bearer
- Steward
- Usher
- Viceroy
