= Etiquette =

Customary code of polite behaviour

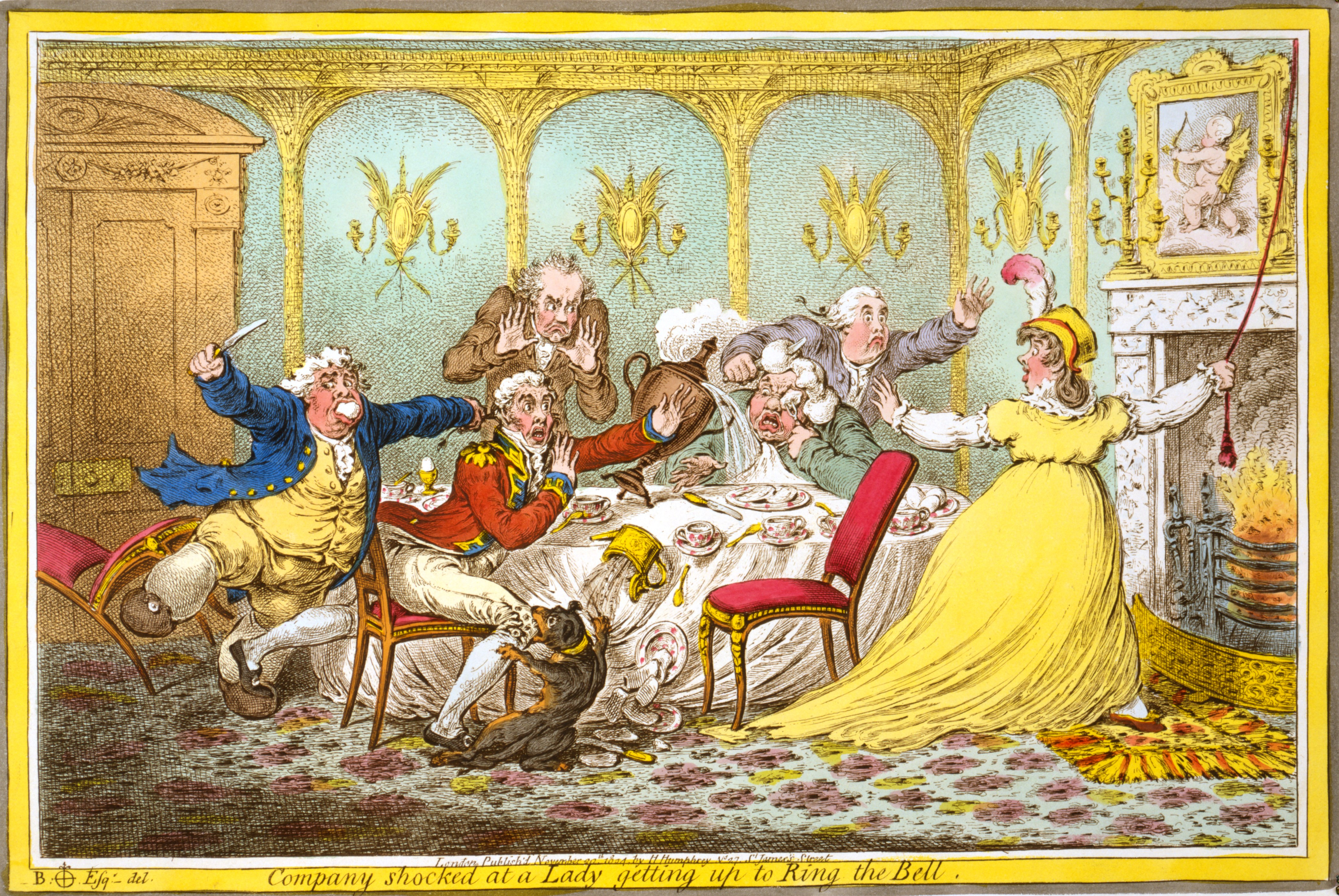
In Company Shocked at a Lady Getting up to Ring the Bell (1805) James Gillray caricatured "A widow and her suitors, who seem to have forgotten their manners in the intensity of their admiration."

Etiquette (/ˈɛtikɛt, -kɪt/) can be defined as a set of norms of personal behavior in polite society, usually occurring in the form of an ethical code of the expected and accepted social behaviors that accord with the conventions and norms observed and practiced by a society, a social class, or a social group. In modern English usage, the French word étiquette (label and tag) dates from the year 1750 and also originates from the French word for "ticket," possibly symbolizing a person's entry into society through proper behavior. There are many important historical figures that have helped to shape the meaning of the term as well as provide varying perspectives.

== History ==
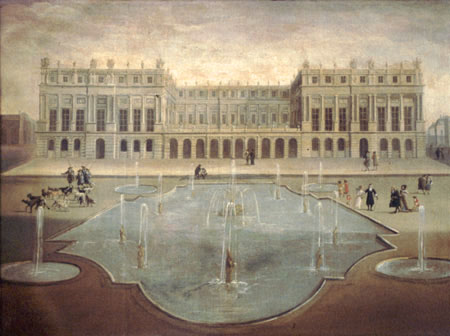
At the Palace of Versailles, King Louis XIV used complicated étiquette to manage and control his courtiers and their politicking.

In the third millennium BCE, the Ancient Egyptian vizier Ptahhotep wrote The Maxims of Ptahhotep (2375–2350 BCE), a didactic book of precepts extolling civil virtues such as truthfulness, self-control, and kindness towards other people. Recurrent thematic motifs in the maxims include learning by listening to other people, being mindful of the imperfection of human knowledge, that avoiding open conflict whenever possible should not be considered weakness, and that the pursuit of justice should be foremost. Yet, in human affairs, the command of a god ultimately prevails in all matters. Some of Ptahhotep's maxims indicate a person's correct behaviors in the presence of great personages (political, military, religious), and instructions on how to choose the right master and how to serve him. Other maxims teach the correct way to be a leader through openness and kindness, that greed is the base of all evil and should be guarded against, and that generosity towards family and friends is praiseworthy.

Confucius (551–479 BCE) was a Chinese intellectual and philosopher whose works emphasized personal and governmental morality, correctness of social relationships, the pursuit of justice in personal dealings, and sincerity in all personal relations.

Baldassare Castiglione (1478–1529 CE), count of Casatico, was an Italian courtier and diplomat, soldier, and author of The Book of the Courtier (1528), an exemplar courtesy book dealing with questions of the etiquette and morality of the courtier during the Italian Renaissance.

Louis XIV (1638–1715), King of France, used a codified etiquette to tame the French nobility and assert his supremacy as the absolute monarch of France. In consequence, the ceremonious royal court favourably impressed foreign dignitaries whom the king received at the seat of French government, the Palace of Versailles, to the south-west of Paris.

Benjamin Franklin (1706–1790), an American inventor and Founding Father, contributed to the American understanding of etiquette through his emphasis on practical morality and social harmony. In his autobiography published in 1791, Franklin outlined a personal system of self-improvement centered around thirteen virtues, including sincerity, humility, and temperance. He viewed etiquette as a means of fostering effective communication, avoiding unnecessary conflict, and promoting cooperation in both personal and public life. Franklin distrusted ostentatious formality and believed manners should serve a purpose rooted in usefulness, sincerity, and democratic ideals.

George Washington (1732–1799), the first President of the United States and commander of the Continental Army during the American Revolutionary War, was heavily influenced in his youth by a set of social maxims titled Rules of Civility & Decent Behaviour in Company and Conversation. Adapted from an earlier French text, these 110 rules emphasized humility, respect for others, restraint, and the importance of maintaining decorum in public life. Though Washington did not write the rules himself, copying them by hand served as early moral training and significantly shaped his public persona. The maxims promoted the idea that civil behavior was a reflection of personal virtue and that etiquette could serve as a tool for cultivating leadership and moral character. Despite George Washington's strong public support for education, many of his contemporaries criticized his intellect, labeling him as poorly educated and lacking eloquence. Figures like Aaron Burr, Thomas Jefferson, and John Adams described him as unrefined, grammatically weak, and intellectually limited. Due to Washington's personal sensitivity to the level of his academic exposure, these critiques only increased the motivation to copy the 110 rules. Although there may not be any evidence of George Washington verbally passing on the maxims, his actions and character served as a physical example of these beliefs.

== Politeness ==
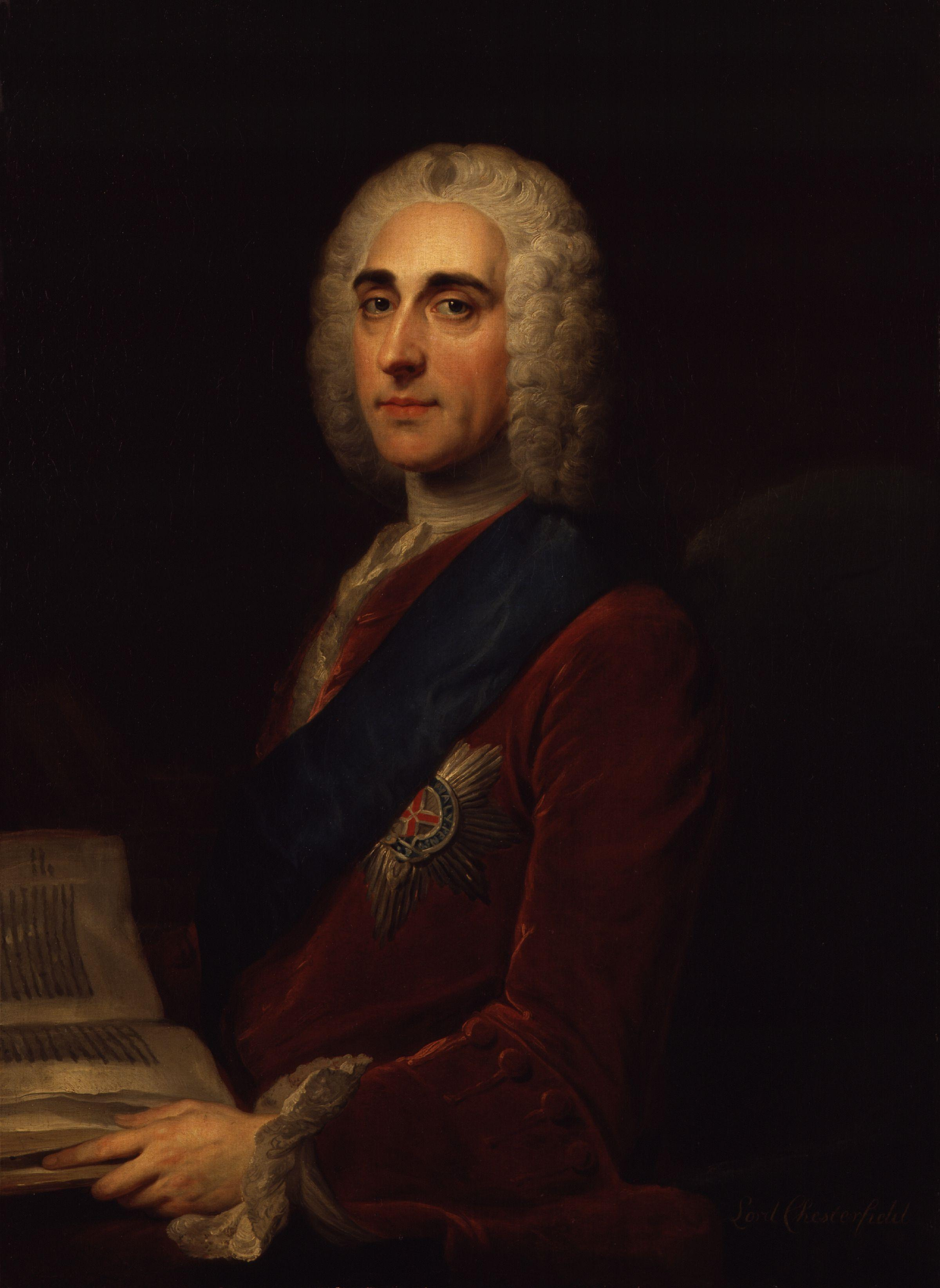
In the 18th century, Philip Stanhope, the 4th Earl of Chesterfield, first used the word etiquette to mean "the conventional rules of personal behaviour in polite society." (William Hoare)

In the 18th century, during the Age of Enlightenment, the adoption of etiquette was a self-conscious process for acquiring the conventions of politeness and the normative behaviours (charm, manners, demeanour) which symbolically identified the person as a genteel member of the upper class. To identify with the social élite, the upwardly mobile middle class and the bourgeoisie adopted the behaviours and the artistic preferences of the upper class. To that end, socially ambitious people of the middle classes occupied themselves with learning, knowing, and practising the rules of social etiquette, such as the arts of elegant dress and gracious conversation, when to show emotion, and courtesy with and towards women.

In the early 18th century, Anthony Ashley-Cooper, 3rd Earl of Shaftesbury, wrote influential essays that defined politeness as the art of being pleasing in company; and discussed the function and nature of politeness in the social discourse of a commercial society:

'Politeness' may be defined as dext'rous management of our words and actions, whereby we make other people have better opinion of us and themselves.

Periodicals, such as The Spectator, a daily publication founded in 1711 by Joseph Addison and Richard Steele, regularly advised their readers on the etiquette required of a gentleman, a man of good and courteous conduct; their stated editorial goal was "to enliven morality with wit, and to temper wit with morality… to bring philosophy out of the closets and libraries, schools and colleges, to dwell in clubs and assemblies, at tea-tables and coffeehouses"; to which end, the editors published articles written by educated authors, which provided topics for civil conversation, and advice on the requisite manners for carrying a polite conversation, and for managing social interactions.

Conceptually allied to etiquette is the notion of civility (social interaction characterised by sober and reasoned debate) which for socially ambitious men and women also became an important personal quality to possess for social advancement. In the event, gentlemen's clubs, such as Harrington's Rota Club, published an in-house etiquette that codified the civility expected of the members. Besides The Spectator, other periodicals sought to infuse politeness into English coffeehouse conversation, the editors of The Tatler were explicit that their purpose was the reformation of English manners and morals; to those ends, etiquette was presented as the virtue of morality and a code of behaviour.

In the mid-18th century, the first, modern English usage of etiquette (the conventional rules of personal behaviour in polite society) was by Philip Stanhope, 4th Earl of Chesterfield, in the book Letters to His Son on the Art of Becoming a Man of the World and a Gentleman (1774), a correspondence of more than 400 letters written from 1737 until the death of his son, in 1768; most of the letters were instructive, concerning varied subjects that a worldly gentleman should know. The letters were first published in 1774, by Eugenia Stanhope, the widow of the diplomat Philip Stanhope, Chesterfield's bastard son. Throughout the correspondence, Chesterfield endeavoured to decouple the matter of social manners from conventional morality, with perceptive observations that pragmatically argue to Philip that mastery of etiquette was an important means for social advancement, for a man such as he. Chesterfield's elegant, literary style of writing epitomised the emotional restraint characteristic of polite social intercourse in 18th-century society:

I would heartily wish that you may often be seen to smile, but never heard to laugh while you live. Frequent and loud laughter is the characteristic of folly and ill-manners; it is the manner in which the mob express their silly joy at silly things; and they call it being merry. In my mind there is nothing so illiberal, and so ill-bred, as audible laughter. I am neither of a melancholy nor a cynical disposition, and am as willing and as apt to be pleased as anybody; but I am sure that since I have had the full use of my reason nobody has ever heard me laugh.

In the 19th century, Victorian era (1837–1901) etiquette developed into a complicated system of codified behaviours, which governed the range of manners in society—from the proper language, style, and method for writing letters, to correctly using cutlery at table, and to the minute regulation of social relations and personal interactions between men and women and among the social classes.

In the 21st century, specifically in the early 2020s as digital communication became more readily available and used in everyday life, the notion of digital etiquette, or netiquette, evolved into a flexible, socially negotiated code of conduct guiding behavior in online spaces. Unlike traditional etiquette, which often revolved around visible symbols of status and formal conduct, digital etiquette today is platform-dependent, highly situational, and subtly influenced by unspoken social norms. For instance, a video call may press for visible presence ("camera on") and active engagement such as contributing ideas or giving visual cues of attention, while sending an email might demand carefully crafted language, formal greetings, and rapid response times to signal competence and respect. An essential aspect of today's netiquette is the management of presence and attention. The expectation to be responsive has become a symbol of respect, while behaviors such as multitasking during meetings or disabling cameras may be interpreted as disrespect or disengagement.

== Manners ==
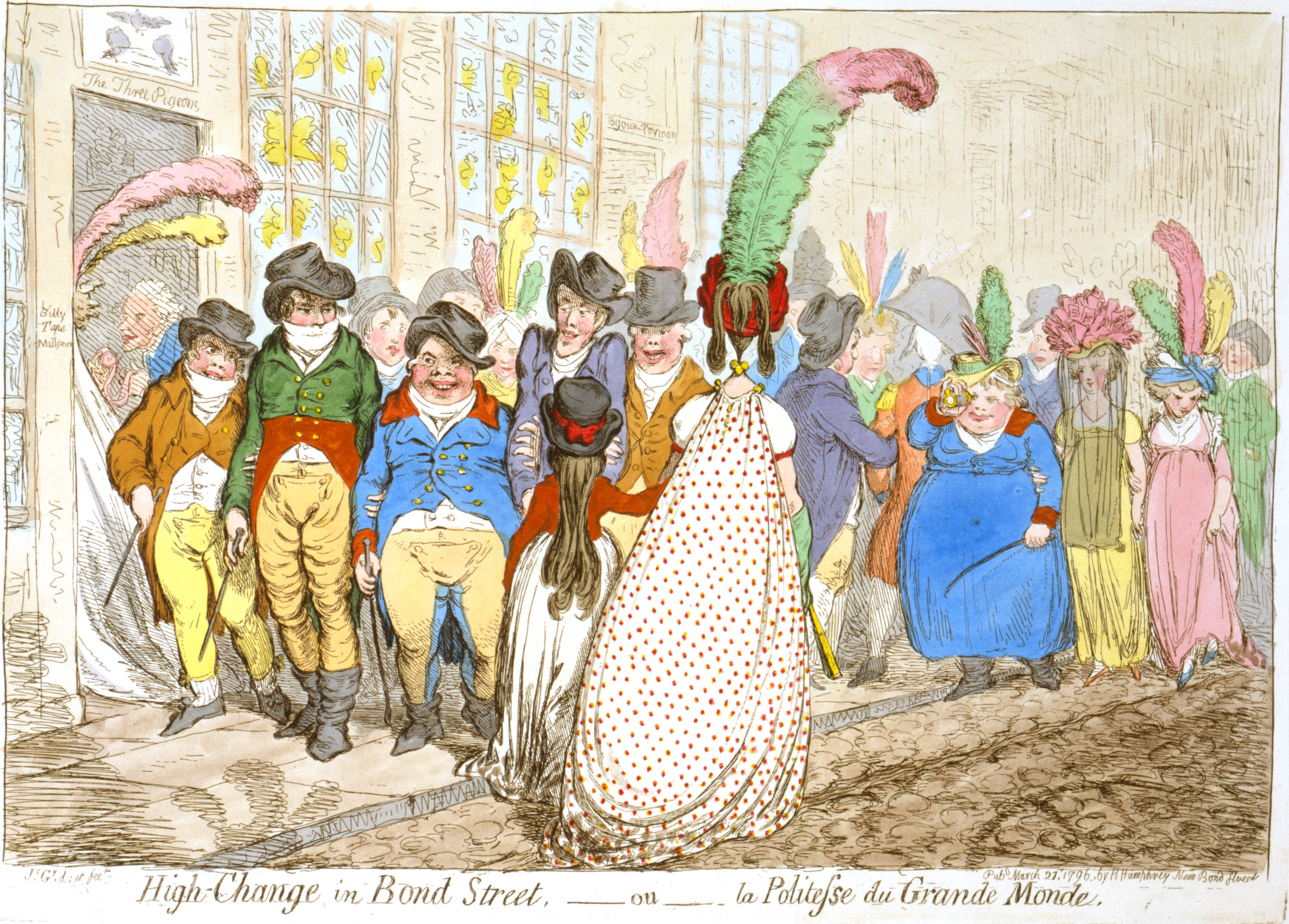
In High-Change in Bond Street, – ou – la Politesse du Grande Monde (1796), James Gillray caricatured the lack of etiquette in a group of men who are depicted leering at women and crowding them off the sidewalk.

=== Sociological perspectives ===
In a society, manners are described as either good manners or as bad manners to indicate whether a person's behaviour is acceptable to the cultural group. As such, manners enable ultrasociality and are integral to the functioning of the social norms and conventions that are informally enforced through self-regulation. The perspectives of sociology indicate that manners are a means for people to display their social status, and a means of demarcating, observing, and maintaining the boundaries of social identity and of social class.

In The Civilizing Process (1939), sociologist Norbert Elias said that manners arose as a product of group living, and persist as a way of maintaining social order. Manners proliferated during the Renaissance in response to the development of the 'absolute state'—the progression from small-group living to large-group living characterised by the centralized power of the State. The rituals and manners associated with the royal court of England during that period were closely bound to a person's social status. Manners demonstrate a person's position within a social network, and a person's manners are a means of negotiation from that social position.

From the perspective of public health, in The Healthy Citizen (1995), Alana R. Petersen and Deborah Lupton said that manners assisted the diminishment of the social boundaries that existed between the public sphere and the private sphere of a person's life, and so gave rise to "a highly reflective self, a self who monitors their behavior with due regard for others with whom he or she interacts, socially"; and that "the public behavior of individuals came to signify their social standing; a means of presenting the self and of evaluating others, and thus the control of the outward self was vital."

Sociologist Pierre Bourdieu applied the concept of habitus to define the societal functions of manners. The habitus is the set of mental attitudes, personal habits, and skills that a person possesses—their dispositions of character that are neither self-determined, nor pre-determined by the external environment, but which are produced and reproduced by social interactions—and are "inculcated through experience and explicit teaching", yet tend to function at the subconscious level. Manners are likely to be a central part of the dispositions that guide a person's ability to decide upon socially-compliant behaviours.

=== Anthropologic perspective ===
In Purity and Danger: An Analysis of Concepts of Pollution and Taboo (2003) the anthropologist Mary Douglas said that manners, social behaviors, and group rituals enable the local cosmology to remain ordered and free from those things that may pollute or defile the integrity of the culture. Ideas of pollution, defilement, and disgust are attached to the margins of socially acceptable behaviour in order to curtail unacceptable behaviour, and so maintain "the assumptions by which experience is controlled" within the culture.

=== Evolutionary perspectives ===
In studying the expression of emotion by humans and animals, naturalist Charles Darwin noted the universality of facial expressions of disgust and shame among infants and blind people, and concluded that the emotional responses of shame and disgust are innate behaviours.

Public health specialist Valerie Curtis said that the development of facial responses was concomitant with the development of manners, which are behaviours with an evolutionary role in preventing the transmission of diseases, thus, people who practise personal hygiene and politeness will most benefit from membership in their social group, and so stand the best chance of biological survival, by way of opportunities for reproduction.

From the study of the evolutionary bases of prejudice, social psychologists Catherine Cottrell and Steven Neuberg said that human behavioural responses to 'otherness' might enable the preservation of manners and social norms. The feeling of "foreignness"—which people experience in their first social interaction with someone from another culture—might partly serve an evolutionary function: 'Group living surrounds one with individuals [who are] able to physically harm fellow group members, to spread contagious disease, or to "free ride" on their efforts'; therefore, a commitment to sociality is a risk: 'If threats, such as these, are left unchecked, the costs of sociality will quickly exceed its benefits. Thus, to maximize the returns on group "living", individual group members should be attuned to others' features or behaviors.'

Therefore, people who possess the social traits common to the cultural group are to be trusted, and people without the common social traits are to be distrusted as 'others', and thus treated with suspicion or excluded from the group. That pressure of social exclusivity, born from the shift towards communal living, excluded uncooperative people and persons with poor personal hygiene. The threat of social exclusion led people to avoid personal behaviors that might embarrass the group or that might provoke revulsion among the group.

To demonstrate the transmission of social conformity, anthropologists Joseph Henrich and Robert Boyd developed a behavioral model in which manners are a means of mitigating social differences, curbing undesirable personal behaviors, and fostering co-operation within the social group. Natural selection favored the acquisition of genetically transmitted mechanisms for learning, thereby increasing a person's chances for acquiring locally adaptive behaviors: "Humans possess a reliably developing neural encoding that compels them both to punish individuals who violate group norms (common beliefs or practices) and [to] punish individuals who do not punish norm-violators."

=== Categories ===
Social manners are in three categories: (i) manners of hygiene, (ii) manners of courtesy, and (iii) manners of cultural norm. Each category accounts for an aspect of the functional role that manners play in a society. The categories of manners are based upon the social outcome of behavior, rather than upon the personal motivation of the behavior. As a means of social management, the rules of etiquette encompass most aspects of human social interaction; thus, a rule of etiquette reflects an underlying ethical code and a person's fashion and social status.

Manners of hygiene
concern avoiding the transmission of disease, and usually are taught by the parent to the child by way of parental discipline, positive behavioral enforcement of body-fluid continence (toilet training), and the avoidance of and removal of disease vectors that risk the health of children. Society expects that by adulthood the manners for personal hygiene have become a second-nature behavior, violations of which shall provoke physical and moral disgust. Hygiene etiquette during the COVID-19 pandemic included social distancing and warnings against public spitting.

Manners of courtesy
concern self-control and good-faith behavior, by which a person gives priority to the interests of another person, and priority to the interests of a socio-cultural group, in order to be a trusted member of that group. Courtesy manners maximize the benefits of group-living by regulating the nature of social interactions; however, the performance of courtesy manners occasionally interferes with the avoidance of communicable disease. Generally, parents teach courtesy manners in the same way they teach hygiene manners, but the child also learns manners directly (by observing the behavior of other people in their social interactions) and by imagined social interactions (through the executive functions of the brain). A child usually learns courtesy manners at an older age than when they were toilet trained (taught hygiene manners), because learning the manners of courtesy requires that the child be self-aware and conscious of social position, which then facilitate understanding that violations (accidental or deliberate) of social courtesy will provoke peer disapproval within the social group.

Manners of cultural norms
concern the social rules by which a person establishes their identity and membership in a given socio-cultural group. In abiding the manners of cultural norm, a person demarcates socio-cultural identity and establishes social boundaries, which then identify whom to trust and whom to distrust as 'the other'. Cultural norm manners are learnt through the enculturation with and the routinisation of 'the familiar', and through social exposure to the 'cultural otherness' of people identified as foreign to the group. Transgressions and flouting of the manners of cultural norm usually result in the social alienation of the transgressor. The nature of culture-norm manners allows a high level of intra-group variability, but the manners usually are common to the people who identify with the given socio-cultural group.

=== Courtesy books ===
16th century

The Book of the Courtier (1528), by Baldassare Castiglione, identified the manners and the morals required by socially ambitious men and women for success in a royal court of the Italian Renaissance (14th–17th c.); as an etiquette text, The Courtier was an influential courtesy book in 16th-century Europe.

On Civility in Children (1530), by Erasmus of Rotterdam, instructs boys in the means of becoming a young man; how to walk and talk, speak and act in the company of adults. The practical advice for acquiring adult self-awareness includes explanations of the symbolic meanings—for adults—of a boy's body language when he is fidgeting and yawning, scratching and bickering. On completing Erasmus's curriculum of etiquette, the boy has learnt that civility is the point of good manners: the adult ability to 'readily ignore the faults of others, but avoid falling short, yourself,' in being civilized.

20th century

Etiquette in Society, in Business, in Politics, and at Home (1922), by Emily Post documents the "trivialities" of desirable conduct in daily life, and provided pragmatic approaches to the practice of good manners—the social conduct expected and appropriate for the events of life, such as a baptism, a wedding, and a funeral.

As didactic texts, books of etiquette (the conventional rules of personal behavior in polite society) usually feature explanatory titles, such as The Ladies' Book of Etiquette, and Manual of Politeness: A Complete Hand Book for the Use of the Lady in Polite Society (1860), by Florence Hartley; Amy Vanderbilt's Complete Book of Etiquette (1957); Miss Manners' Guide to Excruciatingly Correct Behavior (1979), by Judith Martin; and Peas & Queues: The Minefield of Modern Manners (2013), by Sandi Toksvig. Such books present ranges of civility, socially acceptable behaviors for their respective times. Each author cautions the reader that to be a well-mannered person they must practice good manners in their public and private lives.

The How Rude! comic-book series addresses and discusses adolescent perspectives and questions of etiquette, social manners, and civility.

=== Business ===
In commerce, the purpose of etiquette is to facilitate the social relations necessary for realizing business transactions; in particular, social interactions among workers, and between labor and management. Business etiquette varies by culture, such as the Chinese and Australian approaches to conflict resolution. The Chinese business philosophy is based upon guanxi (personal connections), whereby person-to-person negotiation resolves difficult matters, whereas Australian business philosophy relies upon attorneys-at-law to resolve business conflicts through legal mediation; thus, adjusting to the etiquette and professional ethics of another culture is an element of culture shock for businesspeople.

In 2011, etiquette trainers formed the Institute of Image Training and Testing International (IITTI) a non-profit organization to train personnel departments in measuring and developing and teaching social skills to employees, by way of education in the rules of personal and business etiquette, in order to produce business workers who possess standardized manners for successfully conducting business with people from other cultures.

In the retail branch of commerce, the saying "the customer is always right" summarizes the profit-orientation of good manners, between the buyer and the seller of goods and services:

There are always two sides to the case, of course, and it is a credit to good manners that there is scarcely ever any friction in stores and shops of the first class. Salesmen and women are usually persons who are both patient and polite, and their customers are most often ladies in fact as well as "by courtesy." Between those before and those behind the counters, there has sprung up in many instances a relationship of mutual goodwill and friendliness. It is, in fact, only the woman who is afraid that someone may encroach upon her exceedingly insecure dignity, who shows neither courtesy nor consideration to any except those whom she considers it to her advantage to please.

— Emily Post Etiquette 1922

== See also ==
Etiquette and language
- Acrolect
- Aizuchi
- Basilect
- Honorific title
- Honorifics (linguistics) - politeness markers
- Insult
- Netiquette
- Polite fiction
- Prescription and description
- Profanity
- Semantics
- Slang
- Slang dictionary
- Standard language
- Style of address
- T–V distinction
- What happens on tour, stays on tour

Etiquette and letters

- Airmail etiquette
- Email etiquettes
- Missed call § Social usage

Etiquette and society

- Aliénor de Poitiers early documentor of French etiquette
- Code of conduct
- Church etiquette
- Cigar etiquette
- Cinema etiquette
- Civics
- Concert etiquette
- Dance etiquette
- Debrett's
- Diplomacy
- Drinking etiquette
- Driving etiquette
- Escalator etiquette
- Faux pas, Faux pas derived from Chinese pronunciation
- Golf etiquette
- Intercultural competence
- Levée, the English version of Louis XIV's morning rising etiquette (lever) at Versailles.
- Military courtesy
- Order of precedence
- Protocol
- Respect
- Rules of Civility and Decent Behaviour In Company and Conversation by George Washington
- Rudeness
- Social graces
- Social Norms
- Table manners
  - Eating utensil etiquette
- Technology
  - Cell phone
  - Gaming
- Work etiquette

Worldwide etiquette

- Africa
- Asia
  - Chinese dining
  - Indian dining
  - Indonesia
  - Japan
  - Jewish customs of etiquette
  - Myanmar
  - Pakistan
  - South Korea
- Australia and New Zealand
- Europe
  - Dutch customs and etiquette
- Latin America
- Middle East
- North America
- Islamic etiquette
  - Islamic toilet etiquette
