= Aliénor de Poitiers =

Burgundian courtier and writer

Aliénor de Poitiers or Eleanor de Poitiers (1444/1446–1509) was a Burgundian courtier and writer, noted for writing Les Honneurs de la Cour, an account of precedence and ceremony at Burgundian Court, and based on her own experiences of court-life.

== Biography ==
Aliénor was the daughter of the nobleman, Jean de Poitiers of Champagne and Isabel de Sousa, a member of an illegitimate line of the royal house of Portugal. Her parents were both members of the court of the Duke Philip the Good and Isabella of Portugal, Duchess of Burgundy. Her mother had come to Flanders in 1429 as part of Isabella's retinue and was acutely aware of the differences between the Portuguese Court and the Burgundian Court.

Aliénor was raised in the court and from the age of 7, served alongside her mother who at the time was the highest ranked ladies in waiting to Isabella. Aliénor became a demoiselle d'honneur to Isabella of Bourbon in 1458.

In 1462, she married Guillame de Stavele, the Vicount of Veurne (d. 1469). She and Guillame had three children; a boy, Guillaume (1465-1474), and two daughters Adrienne (1467-1525) and Antoine (1469- 1494). She became a widow at around the age of 25 years, just nine years after her marriage. She never remarried. In 1496, she was appointed dame d'honneur to the new duchess of Burgundy, Joanna of Castile, following her marriage to Philip I of Castile. She died on 14 March 1509, at the age of around 65 years, and was buried at her husband's side in the Stavele Parish Church.

== Writing ==
An acute observer, and stickler for protocol, Aliénor de Poitiers committed matters of court etiquette to writing between 1484 and 1491. Her work was later published as Les Honneurs de la Cour (Honors of the Court) The book gives the structures and rules of court ritual and the etiquette appropriate to different social classes and situations. She was particularly interested in the conventions observed when ladies of various ranks were lying in the birthing chamber. The book gives a description of the court life of the Duchy of Burgundy, at the time renowned as the most developed and refined in all Europe outside of Italy. A notable feature of the work is its account of the importance of women in memory and transmitting ritual conduct in court-life. Although she originally intended her publication to be used as an instructional manual, it has become a valuable historical source.

Written during the political vacuum following the death of Duke Phillip's successor, Aliénor was aware that strict court protocols were changing. She feared that the younger generation were forgetting court rules and wanted to preserve the rigid Burgundian arrangements of perfect courtesy, where everyone knew their place. She lamented that the "old rules have been changed in certain places...but that cannot degrade or abolish such ancient honours and estates, which were made and formed after much thought and for good reason."

The book was based on her first-hand observations of courtly life at the Burgundian court. However, she also drew on her mother's experience as lady-in-waiting to Isabella of Portugal, Duchess of Burgundy. In addition to her own observations, she gives those of her mother, and those of another noble lady, Jeanne d'Harcourt, married in 1391 to the Count William de Namur. She had been considered the best authority on court etiquette in the kingdom of France. The resulting collection of the customs of the court forms a kind of family diary embracing three generations, and extending back over more than a century.

The book should not be confused with the similarly titled fr:Honneurs de la Cour, a peerage-book established in France in the 18th century to decide a noble's rank.
