= How Rude! =

American etiquette book series

How Rude! is an American series of comical manners books for teens written by educator and psychologist Alex J. Packer, PhD.

== Contents ==
In 465 pages, How Rude!: The Teenagers' Guide to Good Manners, Proper Behavior and Not Grossing People Out covers most aspects of life that teens are likely to encounter. The text is broken up into short chunks for easy reading.

According to Packer, "Good manners are good for you. They impress people. They build self-esteem. They can help you get what you want from life: friends, fun, success and respect. And they don't cost anything." Seeking to avoid the stereotype of etiquette books as preachy and dull, How Rude! aims to keep teenage readers amused while teaching them the basics of polite behavior in all kinds of situations: at home, at school, in public, with friends, with strangers, at the mall, at the movies, on the phone, online, in conversations, at job interviews, in restaurants, on elevators, in cars, on skateboards, at parties, at formal dinners, on the bus and anywhere they go.

The series gives advice on a variety of subjects, including how to navigate cliques, handle friendship problems, be a host and a guest, offer someone their seat, fight fair, answer invitations, deal with rude adults, respond to bigoted remarks, write a letter, dress properly for any occasion, master techniques for civilized spitting, scratching, sneezing, yawning, coughing, hiccuping, nose-picking, as well as other topics.

Hundreds of "Dear Alex" questions and answers cover a broad range of issues, ranging from dating to breaking up, thank-you notes, table manners, ethnic jokes, obscene phone calls, skiing, and driving. The books also feature "True Stories from the Manners Frontier", a reoccurring segment featuring anacdotes about times when bad manners were used and the consequences that followed. The series also features survey results on the opinions of teens, parents and teachers about proper manners and its importance.

== Reception ==
How Rude! was selected by Young Adult Library Services Association (YALSA) as a "Popular Paperback for Young Adults" and a "Quick Pick for Reluctant Young Adult Readers."

Voice of Youth Advocates called How Rude! "the most incredibly readable, enjoyable, laughable, enlightening and insightful book." College Bound magazine described How Rude! as "...one fast-paced, fun-to-read book that covers the basics of good behavior for teens... Just one look at the table of contents will convince you that this isn't your grandma's guidebook. This is a wonderfully hip and humorous easy read!"

School Library Journal wrote, "From its intriguing title to the tongue-in-cheek ideas for dealing with many kinds of situations, readers will find this manual humorous, non-threatening, entertaining and educational."

== Author ==
Packer is an author of many books on parenting. He is President Emeritus of FCD Educational Services, which provides drug education to colleges and schools.

Other books by Packer include: Wise Highs!: How to Thrill, Chill and Get Away from It All Without Alcohol or Other Drugs; Parenting One Day at a Time; Bringing Up Parents: The Teenager's Handbook; 365 Ways to Love Your Child; and with co-author John Dacey, Ph.D., The Nurturing Parent: How to Raise Creative, Loving, Responsible Children. Packer's books have been translated into many languages including Spanish, German, Serbian, Mandarin, Romanian, Greek, Japanese, Korean and Thai.
