= Church etiquette =

Norms in Christian churches

Church etiquette varies greatly between the different nations and cultural groups among whom Christianity is found. In Western Culture, in common with most social situations, church etiquette has generally changed greatly over the last half-century or more, becoming much less formal. Church etiquette might be seen to mirror other social changes, with the use of given names for leaders, informal dress.

== Dress ==
In North America, Oceania and Europe, up until circa the mid-1970s it was often expected that worshippers wore their best clothes to church services (known colloquially as the Sunday best). This tradition still exists—while it has declined in many mainstream churches, it is still present in the traditional Latin Mass Catholic churches, Southern Baptist, Latter-day Saint and Jehovah's Witnesses traditions in the United States, as well as many black evangelical churches.

Those who support more relaxed dress codes do so on the basis that congregants should come to God as they are, and that communion with God requires no special clothing. Those who support more formal dress consider that although communion with God does indeed not require special clothing, a church service is an office of devotion and as a matter of respect, it is therefore appropriate to wear one's best attire.

In recent decades, some churches have encouraged a more informal dress code. Even where dress code is more relaxed it is still generally considered proper to dress modestly. Among the first to adopt this policy were the Calvary Chapel associated churches. Many clergy members, especially those in denominations and religious groups formed in the 20th century, have abandoned the traditional robes and vestments in favor of business casual clothing. This change was made to close the perceived gap between the clergy and laypersons. Some even wear jeans and other everyday casual wear along with the congregation. One popular option for women is a church suit. Though a small minority, Christian naturists take this one step further, and wear no clothing at all, which they see as "God's design".

== Catholic customs ==
In order to maintain a respectful atmosphere in the major Roman churches, a dress code is recommended, but those not dressed in a conservative fashion will still be admitted into the church.

Upon meeting the Pope, or taking part in Papal ceremonies, the preferred mode of dress is either a business suit or in national costume. Male diplomats may, in formal settings, wear white tie and tails, without top hat. However, black tie is contrary to the norm. Catholic Queens may wear white dresses with white mantillas, usually propped up with an ivory comb. Under normal conditions, other women may wear black dresses with black mantillas. At times, when newlyweds are presented to the Pope, the bride may wear her bridal dress.

== Alcohol ==
It is generally considered poor form to consume alcohol (other than as part of the sacrament) on church premises, and turning up intoxicated to a church service would generally be considered disrespectful. The Methodist, Latter-day Saint, Seventh-day Adventist, and other traditions go further, frowning on alcohol altogether.
