= Work etiquette =

Social code

Work etiquette is a code that governs the expectations of social behavior in a workplace. This code is put in place to "respect and protect time, people, and processes." There is no universal agreement about a standard work etiquette, which may vary from one environment to another. Work etiquette includes a wide range of aspects such as body language, good behavior, appropriate use of technology, etc. Part of office etiquette is working well with others and communicating effectively.

== Dress code ==
An example of business casual

Dress codes are often enforced in the workplace to "dress in a manner appropriate to their responsibilities." They also allow for a "aesthetical recognition" between members and non-members. Commonly, employers won't specifically have a dress code, rather the dress code is regulated through norms and perpetuated through its employees. Business casual is a commonly used term when describing what kind of clothing is appropriate for the workplace. However, specific clothing regulations varies from profession to profession. An example would be how in an office workplace, it is not appropriate for employees to wear denim jeans and a T-shirt.

Clothing is not the only thing that dress codes may regulate. Oftentimes, dress codes regulate accessories such as jewelry and hats. For instance, with the exception of religious headgear, most dress codes deem it inappropriate to wear hats in the workplace. Casual Fridays are sometimes allowed in certain workplaces, which allows the employee to wear jeans or a casual shirt that is inoffensive to others.

== Communication and healthy work relationships ==
Proper "business etiquette and manners" is a key role in building relationships in the workplace. In order to maintain healthy work relationships, employees must be team players, this means having "transparency, [being] caring, and empathetic understanding." Also, using proper body language is important in the workplace. An employee presenting themselves in a manner that shows respect demonstrates to those above them that they always maintain professionalism. Something as simple as a handshake speaks volumes about a person. "Good handshakes" have been found to be integral for maintaining professionalism and demonstrating respect. Guides emphasize to "grip the other person's hand firmly, shake three times, and let go." Maintaining eye contact is a good skill to always remember, as eye contact shows interest in the person speaking. Being civil is also crucial to avoid "negative workplace communication." One should avoid using foul language, especially if it is a continuous problem. People should also be aware of their health and be considerate of others by not coming into work sick; this can affect everyone else's health as well. People shouldn't boast about their salaries, or, on the contrary, complain all of the time. Treating others the way you would like to be treated in the workplace includes respecting and encouraging your coworkers by doing things like congratulating them on milestones, a job well done or on a promotion. It is important to be aware of your very own actions. Getting into a heated argument or even physical violence in the workplace is not only inappropriate, but can result in getting fired, as most workplaces have a "zero-tolerance" policy on workplace violence of any kind.

== Using technology ==
Technology also is an important and emerging resource the workplace. However, since it is a more recent development in the workplace, not many rules have been implemented regarding its limits. In terms of cell phones, it is up to the company to regulate cell phone usage. However, in certain professions like construction, it is against Occupational Safety and Health Administration (OSHA) regulations to "engage in any practice or activity that diverts his/her attention while actually engaged in operating the equipment, such as the use of cellular phones" and using it could lead to suspension or termination.

In terms of other technology, such as computers, online etiquette is just as vital to maintaining healthy relationships and professionalism. It is important to make sure when writing emails, memos, or using any form of communication that isn't face-to-face to be clear and concise so there will be no confusion between coworkers. However, many workplaces consider it unsuitable for the workplace to use technology at work in order to use social media platforms or play games. Many employers use disciplinary action to prevent employees from using technology inappropriately. Inappropriate use of technology can be but is not limited to, blogging, instant messaging (IM), using your email for anything not work related, or texting.

According to Borae Jin and Namakee Park (n.d.), greater cell phone usage is linked to poorer social skills and more loneliness. Communicating via messaging, emails or phone calls should be the same as communicating in person, only, it’s not. Via instant messaging and emails people are able to think about a response. They are able to write out, analyze, and decide what they are going to say, taking as long as necessary, not forcing people to learn to think quick on their feet. In person communication is one of the most important parts of professional careers, especially with meetings and networking.

== See also ==
- Etiquette
- Concert etiquette

== Bibliography ==
- Price, E. (2014). Corporate Life: BUSINESS ETIQUETTE THROUGHOUT THE ORGANIZATION. US Black Engineer and Information Technology, 38(3), 18-19. JSTOR 43773148
- DeIuliis, D., PhD. (2016). Workplace communication. Communication Research Trends, 35(1), 3.
- Gay, G. (2015). Corporate Life: DOE FUNDING GIVES BOOST TO HBCUS: ENERGY PROJECTS GENERATE FRESH IDEAS. US Black Engineer and Information Technology, 39(1), 18-19. JSTOR 43773222
- HOFFMAN, E. (2010). Working Effectively ACROSS the Generations. Perspectives on Work,13(2), 29–32. JSTOR 41810168
- Topper, E. (2005). Working Knowledge: Designing Dress Codes. American Libraries, 36(9), 80–80. Retrieved from
- Goldner, H. (2010). You're Going to Wear That? Appearance in the Workplace. GPSolo, 27(1), 20-24. Retrieved from
- Bazin, Y., & Aubert-Tarby, C. (2013). Dressing professional, an aesthetic experience of professions. Society and Business Review, 8(3), 251–268 Dressing professional, an aesthetic experience of professions
- Swaya, M., & Eisenstein, S. (2005). Emerging Technology in the Workplace. The Labor Lawyer, 21(1), 1–17. JSTOR 40862861
- Valo, M. L. (n.d.). The Development of Intercultural Relationships at Work. Retrieved October 26, 2016.
- Sklar, Monica. (2010). Aesthetic expressions: punk dress and the workplace. Retrieved from the University of Minnesota Digital Conservancy, Aesthetic expressions: punk dress and the workplace..
- Scheller Arsht, Susan (July 2014). "This is how worklife should be": Quality connections, positive relationships, and positive organizational climate (Doctor of Philosophy: Communication thesis). University of New Mexico – via UNM Digital Depository.
