= The Public Sphere: An Encyclopedia Article (1964) =

In this article Jürgen Habermas, Sara Lennox, and Frank Lennox attempt to examine the notions of Habermas's thesis, The Structural Transformation of the Public Sphere focusing on the development of the public sphere today. The article begins by demonstrating the idea of a public sphere, referring to it as a "concept" in which private individuals assemble to form a public body in an "unrestricted fashion". According to Habermas, the public sphere itself is to derive from democracy. He highlights the importance of the freedom to assemble and to express opinions in an inclusive manner. The opinions on matters of general interest from a large public body require a vehicle of transmission in order to supply information and enable the possibility for societal influence. He determines that the modern means for this transmission are through media such as newspapers, magazines, television, and radio.

He then discusses the history of the public sphere starting with medieval times and determines that there was no clear separation between the public and private realms, only public representation of power. The medieval representation of the public sphere was linked to the concrete existence of a ruler, for example he referred to the princely seal as a symbol of sovereignty that was considered public. Feudal authorities including church, princes, and nobility began to disintegrated during a long process of polarization and a bourgeois sphere separate from the state came into existence. "Public no longer referred to the "representative" court of a prince endowed with authority, but rather to an institution regulated according to competence, to an apparatus endowed with a monopoly on the legal exertion of authority".

Habermas includes "The Liberal Model of the Public Sphere" in the third section of the article, focusing on the role of the transformation of public discussion. Individuals began to assemble into a public body in order to guarantee the general interest free of political pressures. The editorial staff emerged as a new element that transformed the newspapers into an institution that would make public opinion accessible. Press soon became the mediator for the public's discussion on general interest matters for the masses.

Finally, the article ends with a section on "The Public Sphere in the Social Welfare State Mass Democracy", as Habermas believes that the existence of "The Liberal Model of the Public Sphere" has diminished in today's society with the use of propaganda, and modern journalism. Habermas argues that the public and private spheres have intertwined together as the gaps in education between classes have declined. He suggests that a refeudalization of the public sphere has occurred due to the power and impact of private interest. The public no longer consists of groups of individuals anymore, but rather of those organized and institutions. The public sphere has been weakened of its critical functions, thus can only be realized on an altered basis.
