= Rules of Civility and Decent Behaviour In Company and Conversation =

Etiquette manual associated with George Washington

Rules of Civility & Decent Behaviour In Company and Conversation is the name of a list best known as a school writing exercise of George Washington, who became the first president of the United States of America. Most of the rules have been traced to a French etiquette manual written by Jesuits in 1595 entitled "Bienséance de la conversation entre les hommes". As a handwriting exercise in around 1744, Washington merely copied word-for-word Francis Hawkins' translation which was published in England in about 1640.

== Rules ==
The list of rules opens with the following:

1. Every Action done in Company, ought to be with Some Sign of Respect, to those that are Present.
2. When in Company, put not your Hands to any Part of the Body, not usualy [sic] Discovered.
3. Shew Nothing to your Friend that may affright him.
4. In the Presence of Others Sing not to yourself with a humming Noise, nor Drum with your Fingers or Feet.
5. If You Cough, Sneeze, Sigh, or Yawn, do it not Loud but Privately; and Speak not in your Yawning, but put Your handkercheif [sic] or Hand before your face and turn aside.

The exercise goes on to list a total of 110 such rules.

== In popular culture ==
The list features in the plot of the 2011 Amor Towles novel Rules of Civility, which is named after it.

== Editions ==
- Toner, Joseph Meredith, ed. (1888). Washington's rules of civility and decent behavior in company and conversation. Washington, D.C.: W. H. Morrison.
  - http://hdl.loc.gov/loc.gdc/gdclccn.09030979
  - https://www.loc.gov/item/09030979/
  - https://collections.nlm.nih.gov/bookviewer?PID=nlm:nlmuid-01010330R-bk
  - https://archive.org/details/washingtonsrule00washgoog
  - https://archive.org/details/cu31924032751202
  - https://archive.org/details/01010330R.nlm.nih.gov
- Conway, Moncure Daniel, ed. (1890). George Washington's rules of civility. New York City: Hurst & Company.
  - https://archive.org/details/georgewashingto00washgoog/page/n10/mode/2up
  - https://archive.org/details/georgewashingto01washgoog/page/n8/mode/2up
- Conway, Moncure Daniel, ed. (1890). George Washington's rules of civility. London: Chatto & Windus.
  - https://upload.wikimedia.org/wikipedia/commons/7/75/George_Washington%27s_Rules_of_civility_traced_to_their_sources_and_restored_%28IA_ofciviltytraced00washrich%29.pdf
  - https://archive.org/details/georgewashingto00conwgoog
  - https://archive.org/details/ofciviltytraced00washrich
  - Republished as Garvin, Ted; Cruze, Shawn, eds. (28 October 2024) [1 April 2004]. George Washington's Rules of Civility. Project Gutenberg. ISBN 979-8-238-12029-4.
- Baldridge, Letitia, ed. (1989). George Washington's rules of civility & decent behaviour in company and conversation. Mount Vernon, Virginia: Mount Vernon Ladies' Association. ISBN 978-0-931917-18-9.
- Moore, Charles, ed. (1926). George Washington's Rules of civility and decent behaviour in company and conversation. Boston: Houghton Mifflin.
- Feldhaus, Hal, ed. (1987). Geo. Washington's rules of civility (& good behavior) in conversation amongst men. Alexandria, Virginia: Do It Publishing Group. ISBN 978-0-936265-02-5.
- Goodheart, Adam; Fallaw, W. Robert, eds. (2007). George Washington's rules of civility and decent behavior. Chestertown, Maryland: Literary House Press of Washington College.
- Phillips, John T. II, ed. (2005). George Washington's rules of civility: Complete with the original French text and new French-to-English translations (4th revised ed.). Leesburg, Virginia: Goose Creek Productions. ISBN 978-0-9711173-2-7. OCLC 133466299.
- George Washington's Rules of Civility & Decent Behavior. New York City: Cosimo Classics. 1 November 2008. ISBN 978-1-60520-348-5. Reprint of 1988 edition?
- Kostyal, K. M., ed. (2014). George Washington's rules to live by: a good manners guide from the father of our country. Washington, D.C.: National Geographic Society. ISBN 978-1-4263-1500-8.
- Bolton, Ross, ed. (2016). George Washington's 110 rules of civility and decent behavior in company and conversation. Lexington, KY: Author. ISBN 978-1-4895-9236-1. OCLC 961186328.
