= Dance etiquette =

Conventional rules for social dance

Dance etiquette is the set of conventional rules which govern the social behavior of social dance by its participants. Such rules include the way in which the participants should look and the way in which they approach, dance with and leave their partner. Etiquette can vary in its specification and stringency between different styles of dance.

== According to Emily Post ==
In her book, Etiquette, Emily Post differentiates between a ball and a dance. The primary differences according to Post, are that a ball's invitations will be extended to all the personal friends of the hostess, it is usually decorated lavishly (the most minimal decoration consists of greenery in the corners and vines placed where appropriate), and it at times includes an elaborate meal to precede it. A dance, formally, is a ball on a small scale, with simpler decorations and refreshments and to which only members of a specific age group are invited. Every young man at a dance is required to dance once with the hostess, once with the hostess of the dinner he went to before the dance, once with the girl or girls in honour of whom the dance was given and once with each of the girls he sat next to during dinner. He is also required to make sure that she is not stuck with any one partner for too long and to escort her home at the end of the dance.

=== Cutting in ===
In order to cut in, a young man must place his hand on the shoulder of the partner of the girl he wants to dance with, and the partner will in turn allow him to take over, until another young man does the same to the newcomer. The original partner is not to cut back on the young man who took her from him (though he may do so to a third partner of the same girl) nor may he continuously cut in on the same young man when he dances with different partners. A girl who is dancing may not refuse a partner who cuts in, a rule which was dubbed by Post as "the worst phase of the cutting-in custom".

=== Refusing ===
It is impolite to ask a girl to dance or interrupt her when she is sitting in another room or sitting on the stairs alone with a man. If she is asked while sitting in a group, she may refuse by saying that she is tired, and if she so chooses she may invite the newcomer to sit with them. If a girl refuses the offer of one to dance and then immediately accepts that of another it is an affront to the first, unless he is intoxicated or offensive in other ways - In Post's words: "Under ordinary circumstances, if she is dancing, she must dance with everyone who asks her; if she is not dancing, she must not make exceptions." However, when one of the pair dances awkwardly or does not know the dance steps, the other may suggest to sit out the rest of the dance. It is inexcusable for a man who does not know how to dance to cut in on one who does.

== According to later authors ==
=== Judy Patterson Wright ===
Judy Patterson Wright distinguished between two types of etiquette, partner etiquette which guides how one should behave with one's dance partner, and floor etiquette which defines how one should behave in various sections of the dance floor. She also listed a number of behaviours which "minimal social dancing etiquette" consists of, such as: asking a partner to dance and thanking them politely, being respectful and courteous, being welcoming and creating a comfortable atmosphere when hosting, avoiding collisions on the dance floor and being mindful of floor etiquette.

==== Partner etiquette ====
Although some of Patterson Wright's guidelines are relevant only to the dance class, others are general and can be applied more widely. At the core of these is the respect with which one must treat one's partner, including: being responsible for one's own actions, not to give unsolicited advice or criticism, trusting one's partner to do the correct action when possible, making requests in a polite and positive tone, thanking one's partner and introducing one's self to a new partner.

==== Floor etiquette ====
The dance floor may accommodate different styles of dancing simultaneously, and dancers are to place themselves according to their style of dance. The outer circumference is the fast lane, slower dances, or dances that start and stop, occupy the inner lane, and the centre is for spot dances which take up little room. Dancers are required to look over their partner's right shoulder to survey the dance floor and avoid potential collisions.

=== Stanford Viennese Ball ===
Drawing from etiquette guides of various social dance venues, the Stanford Viennese Ball listed a number of worthy practices for the dance floor. It established that anyone may ask anyone else to dance, though the request must be made verbally, and everyone has the right to decline without the need for justification, the rejection is not to be questioned. Anyone may choose to lead or follow, and it is not to be assumed that they will do one or the other based on previous performance or gender. Additionally, any special move, such as a dip or a close embrace, must be executed only with the consent of the dancing partner, a rule which requires attentiveness. Aerials and lifts are not to be performed as they may put other dancers at risk. Both dance partners are responsible for their conduct on the dance floor, and are required to avoid collisions. Should a collision occur, they must apologise. The dance floor is not the place for flirting, as people come to a dance in order to dance and not to find a romantic partner, nor is it the place to teach, and one is not to correct another's dancing unless they ask or it hurts someone else. Finally, personal care is to be limited to deodorant and should not include cologne or perfume, breath mints are recommended and if a dancer perspires more than most they are to bring a change of clothes.
