= Striking in the King's Court =

Striking in the King's Court was formerly a crime in Great Britain. As the King's palace was exempt from the jurisdiction of any civil or ecclesiastical court, it had its own laws. If one were to strike another and draw blood within the palace where the king or queen resides, or within 200 feet of its outer gate, one could be found guilty of this crime.

The punishment was designed to act as a strong deterrent for others, and so was carried out with solemnity and ceremony. The Serjeant of the King's Wood-Yard brings to the place of execution a square block and rope. The Yeoman of the Scullery lights a fire by the block, which is used to heat the searing-irons (brought by the chief farrier). The chief officers of the cellar and pantry bring the criminal a cup of red wine and a manchet respectively. The Serjeant of the Ewry brings linen for the coming wound, and the Master Cook brings a sharp dresser-knife to cut the bandage.

The chief surgeon performs an amputation of the criminal's right hand. The criminal will then be imprisoned for the rest of their life, fined, and ransomed at the King's Will.

By 1740, although still law, nobody had been found guilty for many years.
