= Seating plan =

Diagram or instructions determining where people should sit

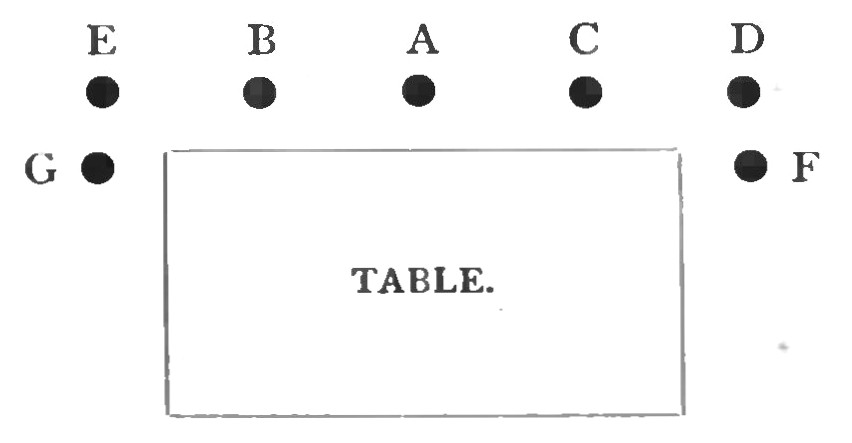
Table seating arrangement

A seating plan is a diagram or a set of written or spoken instructions that determines where people should take their seats. Seating plans are used in a variety of settings.

== Education ==
In schools, seating plans (sometimes known as seating charts) are used to assign students to specific seats. This may be done to support student behaviour, to help teachers to learn student names or to support learning. By seating students according to their academic performance (for example, in Kagan learning structures), students can support each other better.

== Formal dinners ==
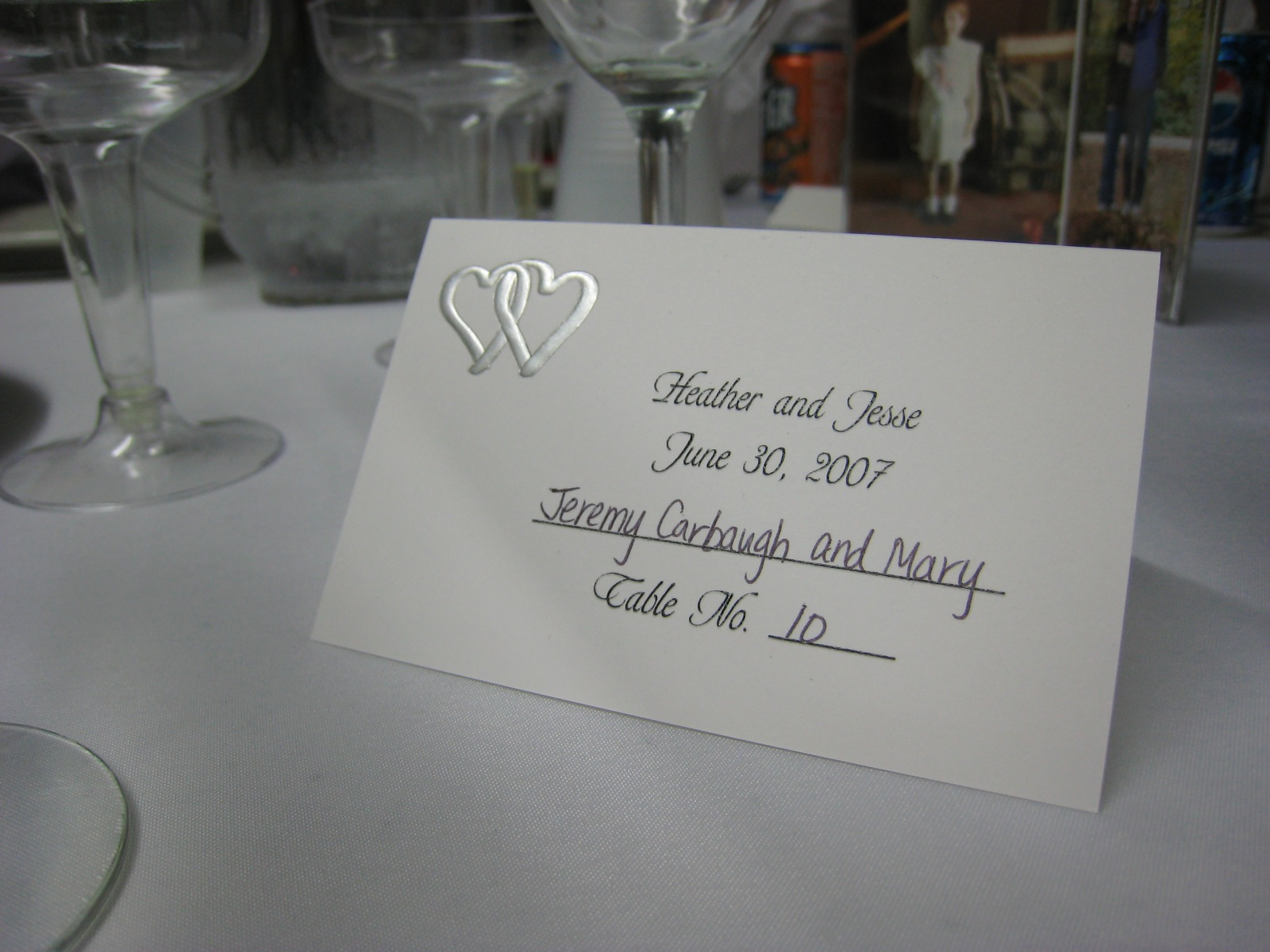
Place card

At formal dinners, plans are usually used to avoid chaos and confusion upon entrance and to follow the etiquette. In this case, it is customary to arrange the host and hostess at the opposite sides of the table, and alternate male and female guests throughout. Place cards can be used to direct guests. State dinners have their own protocol and arrangements are made so that the most distinguished guests can have the possibility to engage in conversation.

In Chinese culture, like many other cultures, the place at the table is a sign of social importance. In the United States according to Peggy Post, "tradition dictates that when everyone is seated together, the host and hostess sit at either end of the table. Honored guests (moms, dads, and in-laws) are placed to the host's and hostess's right and then left." This can also be the source of humor.

== Politics and government ==
An election apportionment diagram is a form of seating chart used to visualize electoral results. Often, they are in the form of a hemicycle.

== Transportation ==
Seating plan for a Boeing 747-400

Plans are also made for airplanes, where the objective is to differentiate passengers between the various travel classes and ensure everybody has a place.

== Entertainment venues ==
Similarly, theatres or cinemas may allow spectators to choose their seats beforehand. A seating plan is of crucial importance for musical ensembles or orchestras, where every type of instrument is allocated a specific section.

== See also ==
- Seating assignment
- Seating capacity
- Table setting
- Kids' table
