= Lillian Eichler Watson =

American author and advertising copywriter (1901–1979)

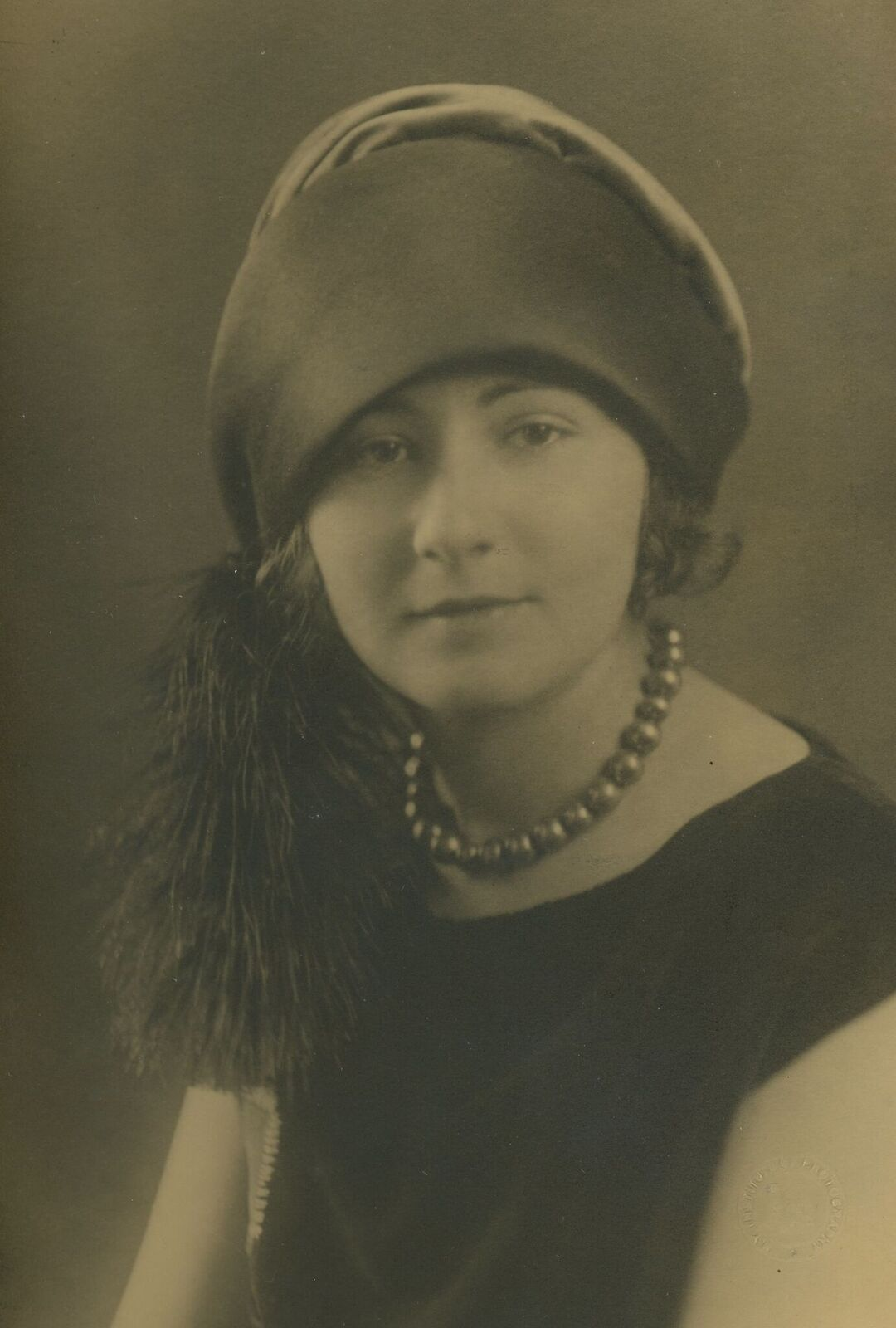
- Born: Lillian Eichler; 3 April 1901; New York City, U.S.
- Died: June 25, 1979 (aged 78); Los Angeles, California, U.S.
- Occupations: Author and advertising copywriter
- Years active: 1919–1970
- Spouse: Dr. Tobias Watson MD (m. 1928)
- Children: 2

Lillian Eichler Watson (April 3, 1901 – June 25, 1979) was an American advertising copywriter and author of bestselling books of etiquette. Her first Book of Etiquette, published in 1921 and for which she created the advertising campaign Again She Orders..."A Chicken Salad, Please", was an immediate bestseller and was followed by several updated volumes and numerous other books.

Many of Eichler's ad campaigns targeted social anxiety.

== Early life ==
Lillian Eichler Watson was born on 3 April 1901. She had an older sister and brother, Charlotte and Sidney, and two younger brothers, Alfred, seven years younger and Julian. She attended Morris High School.

She obtained a job interview with the Manhattan advertising agency Ruthrauff & Ryan in 1919.

== Career ==
=== Copywriter ===
Not having enough money to go to college, Eichler was hired by the "large and important" Manhattan advertising agency Ruthrauff & Ryan in 1919 while in her teens, with help from a family connection. They at first told her that they didn't hire women or Jews, but they were impressed by her portfolio.

Among her first assignments was writing the advertising copy for Rinso laundry soap and creating the popular Rinso jingle ("Rinso white, Rinso white, happy little washday song"). Eichler wrote copy for Rinso for approximately ten years.

One of the agency's new clients was the publishing company Nelson Doubleday, and Eichler, then 18, was assigned the job of trying to sell 1,000 remaining copies of the pre-1900 Everyman's Encyclopedia of Etiquette by Emily Holt. Eichler created an ad showing a guest spilling coffee on the host's tablecloth with the caption, "Has this ever happened to you?" and continued with text designed to appeal to innate insecurities about social embarrassment:

If you were a guest at dinner and you overturned a cup of coffee, what would you do? Would you turn to the hostess and say, 'I beg your pardon'? Would you offer your apologies to the entire company? Would you ignore the incident completely? Which is the correct thing to do?

— Lillian Eichler

Her campaign was so successful that the inventory was sold quickly, but the books themselves contained archaic advice, illustrations, and language and most were quickly returned.

Eichler continued to write advertising copy, including for Cocomalt, whose ads during the time she worked on the account pivoted the brand's approach to selling the stir-in vitamin supplement from focusing on "images of children spotlighted in sunshine" to ads in which mothers suffered social embarrassment because their malnourished children misbehaved in public.

For Ruthrauff & Ryan she also did a series of ads for Lifebuoy soap that focussed on another source of anxiety, body odor.

By 1935 at the age of 32 she was training her brother Alfred to take over her accounts to allow her to become Ruthrauff & Ryan's "idea man" for the agency's entire client list.

=== Etiquette books ===
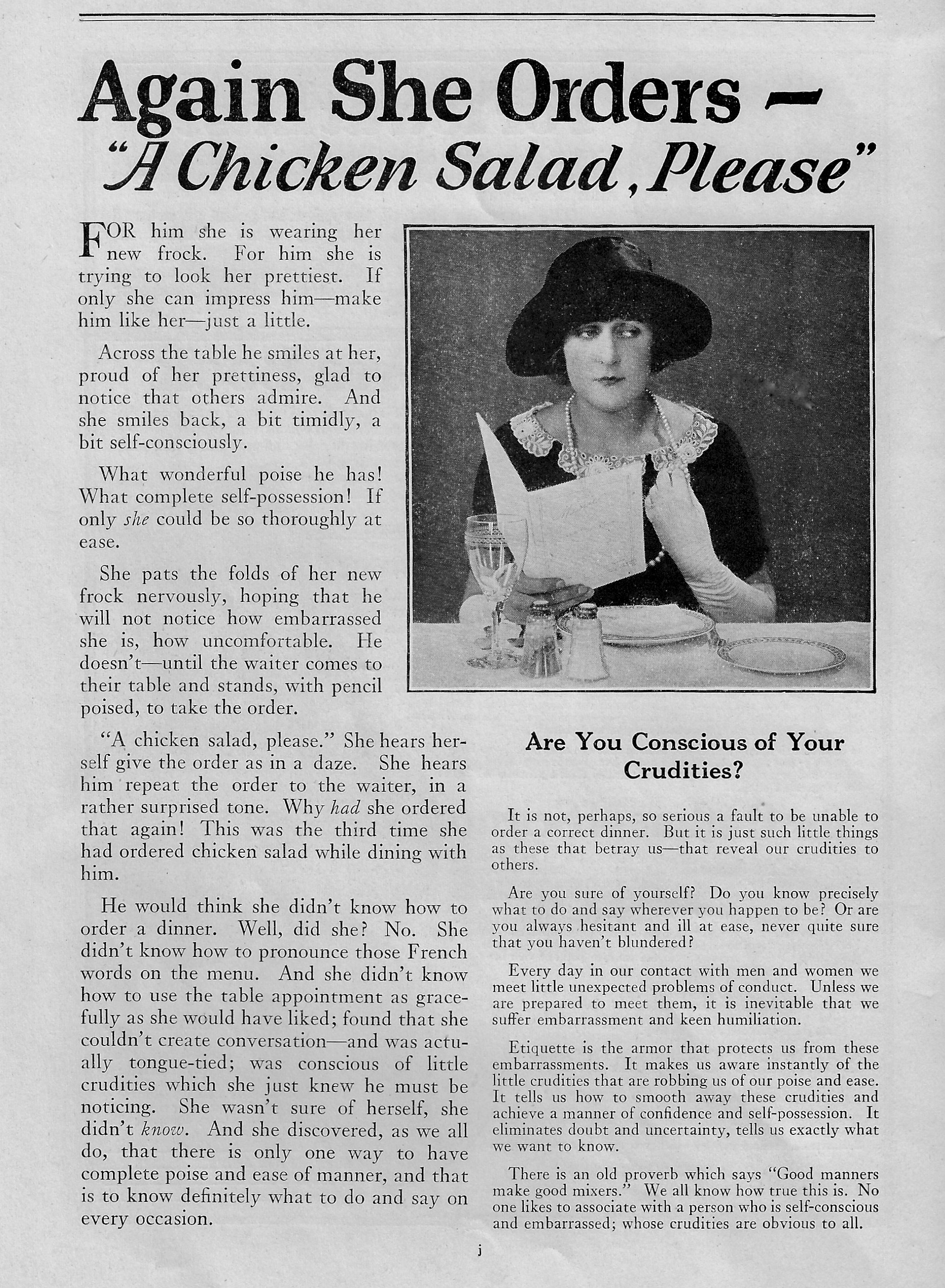
Eichler Watson's well-known 1921 ad, which she wrote for her own Book of Etiquette

Doubleday realized that the success of the marketing campaign itself meant there was a market for an etiquette book and reasoned that if Eichler's ad copy could sell the book, then she might be good enough to rewrite the book herself. She wrote it in two months after working hours.

Eichler's 1921 revised version, The Book of Etiquette, was more modern and appealed to young immigrants anxious to learn correct American behavior. She also wrote the ad for it, headlined "Again She Orders..."A Chicken Salad, Please", which has been described as "sensationally successful" and has been included in Julian Watkins's The 100 Greatest Advertisements in its dozens of editions from the first in 1949 through the most recent in 2013. The advertisement portrayed the plight of a young woman who, on a date with a man she wants to impress, doesn't know how to order dinner in a fancy restaurant, which Victor Schwab said was effective because it "capsulized a common and embarrassing situation." "The chicken-salad girl" became a national reference point. Schwab in 1962 noted that the ad's headline was still being quoted and along with other headlines from the campaign had entered everyday language. Examples include those from other ads created by Eichler such as: "What's Wrong in This Picture?" (a phrase Arthur M. Schlesinger credited her with coining), "Why I Cried After the Ceremony", "May She Invite Him into the House?", "She Ordered Filet Mignon and She Thought it was Fish", and "Suppose This Happened on Your Wedding Day?" Accompanying illustrations emphasized the embarrassment of those being portrayed. The campaigns were "the direct inspiration" of the Everybody Tittered style of advertising that dominated the 1920s.

The book became "the first really successful book on etiquette" in the United States, according to Ken magazine. Eichler became the bestselling author in the United States.

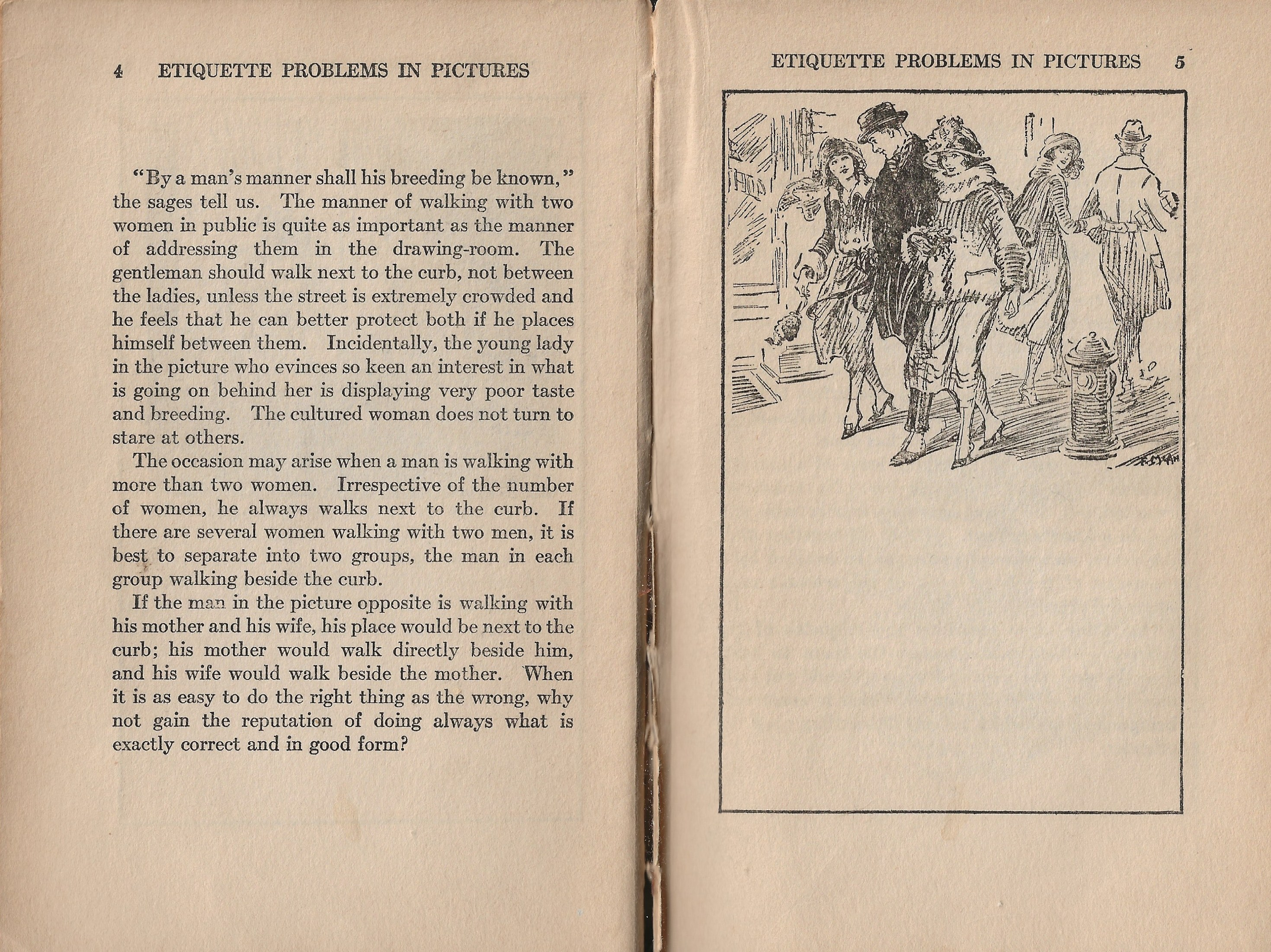
A young man (incorrectly) walks between two women on the street. A woman passerby stares back (also incorrectly) at his gaffe.

Eichler wrote a followup, Etiquette Problems in Pictures, which followed a young and socially inept couple as they attempted to impress neighbors, employers, and others but inevitably embarrassed themselves due to their lack of knowledge of social norms. The book appealed to "those who aspired to the middle class after World War I" and in particular new immigrants. The original Book of Etiquette was published as a gold-edged double volume set and sold more than two million copies at $1.98 each. Eichler produced a revised edition in 1925; although advertising was discontinued approximately in 1939, by 1949 a $1 edition was still generating 2,000 sales per month. By 1959 the newest edition was according to Watkins, "still selling nearly as briskly in bookstores as it once sold by mail."

In the mid-twenties, Eichler was doing a weekly 10-minute radio show on WGBS.

One reviewer of a revised version in 1949 warned those who might be "clinging to an old-fashioned rule or two that might mark you as a fussbudget, vintage 1931" that they might update their manners by reading Eichler's newly updated The Standard Book of Etiquette.

Eichler's books competed with those by Emily Post and the two alternated for books with top sales positions. Whereas Post's 1921 book, Etiquette in Society, in Business, in Politics, and at Home, seemed formal and detached, Eichler's book, as described by literary critic Edmund Wilson, was "friendly and accessible". It frequently out-sold Post, which according to her biographer Laura Claridge made Post quite furious that "a teenage daughter of Jewish immigrants would dare write a book about etiquette". Post's publisher in their ads emphasized the relative authority Post had to "share precious knowledge" to which she had unique access because of her position in society. By 1923 ads for Post's book were making pointed comparisons about the appeal-to-fear nature of the advertising for Eichler's book: "Friendly Example – Not Ridicule".

Eichler-Watson continued to update her etiquette books with several new editions over the next thirty years.

=== Other writing ===
Eichler also wrote other nonfiction and fiction. Her The Customs of Mankind, an 800-page work, became a bestseller in England. Other nonfiction included Well-Bred English (1926) and The Art of Conversation. Works of fiction included Still Born.

== Impact ==
Claridge called Eichler "without a doubt the great forgotten figure in American manners." The 1941 How to Get a Job and Win Success in Advertising (co-edited by Eichler) said 'Again She Orders..."A Chicken Salad Please"' had "paved the way for Emily Post, and helped raise the general level of culture in this country." New Outlook in 1935 said she had "made the country etiquette-conscious".

The campaigns she wrote for her first etiquette book were "the direct inspiration" of the Everybody Tittered style of advertising that dominated the 1920s.

Her first etiquette book became "the first really successful book on etiquette" in the United States, according to Ken magazine. Eichler became the bestselling author in the United States at the time.

== Bibliography ==
- The Book of Etiquette (1921), later reprinted as The Standard Book of Etiquette
- Etiquette Problems in Pictures
- Well Bred English (1926)
- The Book of Conversation
- Charles Dickens
- The Customs of Mankind
- Wee Moderns
- Still Born
- The Standard Book of Letter Writing (1948)
- Light From Many Lamps (1951)

== Personal life ==
Eichler married Tobias F. Watson in 1928 and had two children. In 1941, she and Watson built a 20-room Tudor-styled house in Jackson Heights, Queens, which was declared a landmark, but was finally demolished by New York City in 2011 after unsuccessful efforts to save it.
