= Etiquette in the United States =

Etiquette rules in the United States

Etiquette in the United States is the set of norms for behavior in the United States. These generally apply to all individuals, unlike cultures with more formal class structures, such as those with nobility and royalty. The United States has cultural and linguistic heritage originating in Europe. Some points of traditional European etiquette apply in the United States, especially in more formal settings

Among the most prominent writers on etiquette in the United States are Meloise, Letitia Baldrige, Judith Martin, Emily Post, Elizabeth Post, Peggy Post, Mary Monica Mitchell, Gertrude Pringle, and Amy Vanderbilt.

== Principles ==
Judith Martin states that if one wishes to become an accepted member of any society or group, one "had better learn to practice its etiquette".

Early American etiquette books claimed that the manners and customs of the "Best Society" could be imitated by all, although some authors lamented that the lower classes, meaning those "whose experience in life has been a hardening process", in fact treated the rules of etiquette with "contempt and ... a sneer". Current etiquette books do not employ the concept of "best society", but rather define etiquette as a set of guidelines that "help steer our behavior as we move through our daily routines" and that can help deal with "the pressures of modern life [which] make it all the more difficult to stay civil". This change is reflected in the content of etiquette books; etiquette books published in the early 20th century contained detailed advice on the treatment of servants, the conduct of formal dinner parties, and the behavior of debutantes; more modern books are likely to emphasize the importance of respecting people of all classes, races, and ethnic backgrounds. Some books make a further distinction between etiquette and manners:

Etiquette is protocol, rules of behavior that you memorize and that rarely bend to encompass individual concerns and needs. Manners embrace socially acceptable behavior, of course, but also much more than that. They are an expression of how you treat others when you care about them, their self-esteem, and their feelings.

Etiquette writers assert that etiquette rules, rather than being stuffy or elitist, serve to make life more pleasant. Mary Mitchell states that in most, if not all, cases where conflict emerges between external rules and the urge to be kind and considerate, manners should trump etiquette. She emphasizes that: "In every human situation there is the correct action, the incorrect action, and the appropriate action."

Though etiquette rules may seem arbitrary at times and in various situations, these are the very situations in which a common set of accepted customs can help to eliminate awkwardness. While etiquette is often a means to make others feel comfortable, it is also the case that etiquette can serve to eliminate inappropriate behaviors in others by increasing discomfort.

=== Bodily functions ===
One should attempt to suppress yawning in polite company, concealing the mouth with the back of the hand. Also, sneezing into a handkerchief, tissue, or side of your sleeve is expected, rather than turning or sneezing into the open air.

== Private life ==
=== Invitations ===
- Hospitality requires that when extending an invitation as a host, one anticipates and provides for the needs of the invited guests. "Strings" may not be attached to the invitation. Guest responsibilities include dressing appropriately to the occasion, and providing one's own transportation and lodging. As a courtesy, the host may include dress instructions. (See section on weddings for details on standard North American attire.)

Generally, etiquette writers consider it incorrect to include any suggestion that gifts are, or even could have been, expected at a hosted event, and therefore no mention of gift registries or other prohibitive or prescriptive statements on an invitation are permitted, such as "monetary gifts only", or "no gifts, please". If a guest inquires himself, such things may only then be brought up by the host. Only overnight guests should feel obliged to bring a gift for the host.

An invitation is meant only for the people to whom it is addressed. "Mr. and Mrs. Jones" does not mean "Mr. and Mrs. Jones and any of their relatives they may wish to bring." If wishing to invite additional family members, the host should not add "... and Family", but instead should be specific rather than have the invitees guess what exactly this means. Individuals may decline or accept invitations extended to multiple persons. For example, a woman may accept an invitation extended to her entire family, even if the husband and children must send regrets (all in the same letter to the host). Invitations for mixed social events, such as parties, weddings, etc., must be extended to the established significant others of any invitees, such as spouses, fiancés, or long time or live-in boyfriends or girlfriends. The significant other must be invited by name, and the host should inquire if it is not known. If the couple does not live together, the host should inquire as to the partner's full name and address and send a separate invitation for formal occasions. If a person's socially established partner has not been invited, etiquette allows him or her to politely request that the host do so. Persons without socially established partners may not request to bring a guest, nor is a host expected to invite singles to bring a date (i.e., "[Invitee] and Guest").

- When receiving an invitation, one is obliged to respond in kind as soon as possible. This means if receiving the invitation by phone, reply by phone, etc. One must accept or decline even if "RSVP" is not specified. To not do so is an insult to the host.

Most formal invitations are hand-written, but for large numbers, such as for weddings, engraved or printed invitations are acceptable, though less formal. Printing is considered less appropriate than "frank and honest" handwriting. Engraved invitations, which are more expensive than printed ones, are shipped with protective tissue paper to prevent wet ink from smudging, but as the ink has dried by the time they are received by the hosts, they should be removed before mailing to guests, and etiquette authorities consider their inclusion to be improper and a form of bragging.

Emily Post's Etiquette gives examples of the traditional forms for formal and informal invitations; granddaughter Peggy Post provides updated examples of the forms in Etiquette (17th edition) that take into account non-traditional social relationships.

Reply cards, with or without postage, may be included with an invitation according to some etiquette writers, though they need not be. However, Judith Martin calls response cards "vulgar", as they imply the guest would not reply without being prompted to do so. She advocates discarding them and replying on one's own stationery, while Peggy Post suggests that guests use them if included, to avoid interfering with the host's card collection system. Some say maps, directions, websites, and other information may be included. Others note that these are not formal aspects of an invitation, and therefore should not be included in formal invitations, and those who accept should instead later be sent the information via informal communication, such as postal mail, phone, or the Internet. At-home cards may be included with wedding invitations. Traditionally, they announced the bride and groom's new address; they are now more likely to be used to announce the couple's choice of surnames.

=== Weddings ===
See also "Gifts" and "Invitations" sections

Weddings are often an occasion for particular concern about etiquette; and for some people, weddings are the only time when etiquette becomes a concern. In general, etiquette writers state that a wedding should be one more occasion for the exercise of thoughtfulness towards others, and thus a wedding is not, as is often said, "my special day" (a term "which seems to sanction selfishness"), "her day", or "their day", but an event to be enjoyed by all invited to be present.

==== Wedding planning ====
Etiquette writers agree that the first step in planning a wedding should be selecting the guest list, not deciding on the type of wedding to be held. This is because others' enjoyment of the celebration should be a priority, not one's personal desires or fantasies, or as Judith Martin said, "The guest list should have priority over the arrangements, which is to say that you ask first who should be there, and then what you can afford to feed them, rather than the other way around." Traditionally, "the guest list was divided equally between the bride's and the groom's families and friends, but this is no longer considered necessary".

Likewise, etiquette writers prescribe that the selection of a bridal party should be based on interpersonal closeness to the bride or to the groom. In the past, women were most likely to choose female attendants, and likewise for the groom and males, but "friendship [should be] the chief factor, not gender" in selecting attendants. Each member of the bridal party should stand with the person to whom he or she is closest. Terms such as "man of honor", "bridesmen", "groomswomen", and "best woman" are used when appropriate. A bridal party is not, in Judith Martin's words, a "chorus line", and therefore the bridal party needn't consist of either equal numbers on each side, nor equal numbers of men and women.

Guests should not be expected to wait for an extended period of time between the ceremony and reception, and should be fed a meal if the reception and/or ceremony is during normal meal times. However, while hosts must supply beverages of some sort, they are considered under no obligation to provide alcohol. Those who do so are obliged to provide neither unlimited nor specific types of alcohol. Cash bars are considered inappropriate by etiquette writers, on the grounds that it is inappropriate to ask guests to pay for anything and because "true hospitality shares what it has. It does not attempt to give what it has not." While commonly seen in reception rooms, a cash bar indicates that the host believes the guests should have access to drinks, but is not willing to pay for them. Judith Martin suggests that if one cannot afford to serve liquor at the reception, "... serve tea or punch. If you can't afford that, serve water. But serve it graciously."

While in the past it was customary for the bride's parents to pay for the wedding, today, "[t]he days when the bride's parents were expected to bear all the expenses of the wedding and reception are over". In 1922, Emily Post had called it an "unalterable rule" that the wedding be given always by the bride's parents, never by the groom or his parents. Others believe that while this was the custom, it was simply a voluntary gesture of the bride's parents.

==== Attire ====
The bride may wear any color, although since the 19th century first-time brides often choose to wear white, especially in a white wedding (a specific wedding routine, often taking place inside a church). The idea that white signifies the bride's virginity has long since been abandoned, but the rule that others present should avoid white has not.

Men and women in the bridal party should dress to the same level of formality as the bride and groom, but need not wear matching suits, dresses, or colors. While black attire has become common for female wedding party members, not all etiquette writers believe this is a correct selection. Peggy Post writes that "[v]irtually all colors are acceptable today, including black and shades of white". Others, such as Judith Martin, argue that in North American culture "black symbolizes death....[A] great many people are still shocked to see it at weddings, even on guests, because it gives them tragic associations".

==== Guests and gifts ====
- While gifts are customarily given, they are not to be expected by the recipient. Guests are under no obligation to spend a particular amount of money - enough to cover the supposed cost of their meal, for example - or to buy a particular gift, from a gift registry, for instance. Authorities differ on when a gift should be given; some say that guests have up to a year to give a gift, while others state that a gift should be given before or as soon after the wedding as possible.
- Guests should not expect to receive party favors. It is considered improper for hosts to announce that they have made a charitable donation "in lieu of favors" as this is the broadcasting of a private matter which would normally not be discussed with others.
- Though common in some circles, asking guests "where their envelope is", wishing wells, and money dances are considered vulgar by North American etiquette authorities, as they are blatant indications that cash gifts are expected from the guests.

== Public interactions ==
=== Seating ===
If seating is limited (or there is standing-room only) in public transportation or waiting areas, it is proper for people in good health to offer their seats to an elderly person and to those with special needs, such as the frail, disabled, people with infants, and pregnant women, or women in general more traditionally. It is considered rude, however, to ask another person to give up their seat, as they may have a medical or physical condition.

=== Cultural identity ===
Canadians strongly dislike being mistaken for American citizens.

== See also ==
- Table manners in North America
- Etiquette in Africa
- Etiquette in Asia
- Etiquette in Australia and New Zealand
- Etiquette in Europe
- Etiquette in Latin America
- Etiquette in the Middle East
- Worldwide etiquette
