= Jefferson dinner =

Carefully curated dinner party

A Jefferson dinner or Jeffersonian-style dinner, is a dinner party characterized by a relatively small and carefully curated list of guests dining at one table and engaging in discourse on one or more specific topics. Usually this involves the host curating a guest list (typically 8-14 guests), carefully choosing a seating chart, and coming up with a topic for conversation. The topic can be anything: a cause the host and guests are passionate about, a challenge that concerns the hosts and guests, or an issue the host and guests are fascinated (or confused) by. It is important that guests at a Jefferson dinner are seated at one table and that side conversations are limited/prevented as the idea is to have a single group discussion.

Jefferson dinners are often used by non-profits to help clarify their mission and strengthen the overall organization, much like a focus group. This is often differentiated from fund-raising dinners in that what is sought from the participants is advice, not necessarily money, though in many cases people often opt to make a financial contribution.

== See also ==
- List of dining events
