= Hemicircle =

Hemicircle may refer to:

- Hemicycle, a semicircular or horseshoe shaped debating chamber
- Semicircle, a geometric shape that forms half of a circle
