= Elizabeth Post =

American etiquette writer (1920–2010)

Elizabeth L. Post
- Born: May 7, 1920; Englewood, New Jersey, United States
- Died: April 24, 2010 (aged 89); Naples, Florida, United States
- Spouse(s): Lt. George Eustis Cookman, USN (1941–1943); William Goadby Post (1944–2010)
- Children: 4
- Relatives: Emily Post (grandmother-in-law); Peggy Post (daughter-in-law)
- Writing career
- Subject: Etiquette

Elizabeth Lindley Post (May 7, 1920 – April 24, 2010) was an American etiquette writer, the granddaughter-in-law of Emily Post.

Born the third child of Allen Ledyard Lindley and Elizabeth Ellsworth Lindley, she was the great-granddaughter of Cyrus Field. Elizabeth Lindley's first husband was Lt. George Eustis Cookman, USN, who was killed in action in 1943. They had one son, Allen, who took his stepfathers last name. She married William Goadby Post, the only grandchild of Emily Post, in 1944.

She succeeded Emily Post at The Emily Post Institute and served as director for over 30 years. Elizabeth Post revised and updated Emily Post's Etiquette five times from 1965 to 1992, with her last revision selling more than 80,000 copies. She also wrote the "Etiquette for Everyday" column published monthly in Good Housekeeping magazine. She authored more than ten other books, including Emily Post's Complete Book of Wedding Etiquette, Emily Post on Business Etiquette, and Emily Post on Entertaining,.

She retired in 1995 and was succeeded by daughter-in-law Peggy Post in her duties at the Emily Post Institute and Good Housekeeping column.

Mrs. Post was known to family and friends as "Libby". According to Peggy Post: "Libby was very open minded, fair and flexible... She was full of common sense and kindness. Not at all pretentious and not at all stuffy." Post enjoyed fishing alongside her husband, and she landed the largest tarpon caught by a woman in the United States.

Post died on April 24, 2010, in Naples, Florida, at the age of 89.
