= Senning =

Senning is a surname. Notable people with the surname include:

- Åke Senning (1915–2000), Swedish cardiac surgeon
  - Senning procedure, an atrial switch heart operation
- Daniel Post Senning (born c. 1978), American etiquette expert
- John Peter Senning (1884-1954), political science professor at Wesleyan Univ. (Connecticut) and Univ. of Nebraska
- Niels Claussøn Senning (c. 1580–1617), Danish/Norwegian Lutheran bishop
