= Place card =

Seating assignment at an event

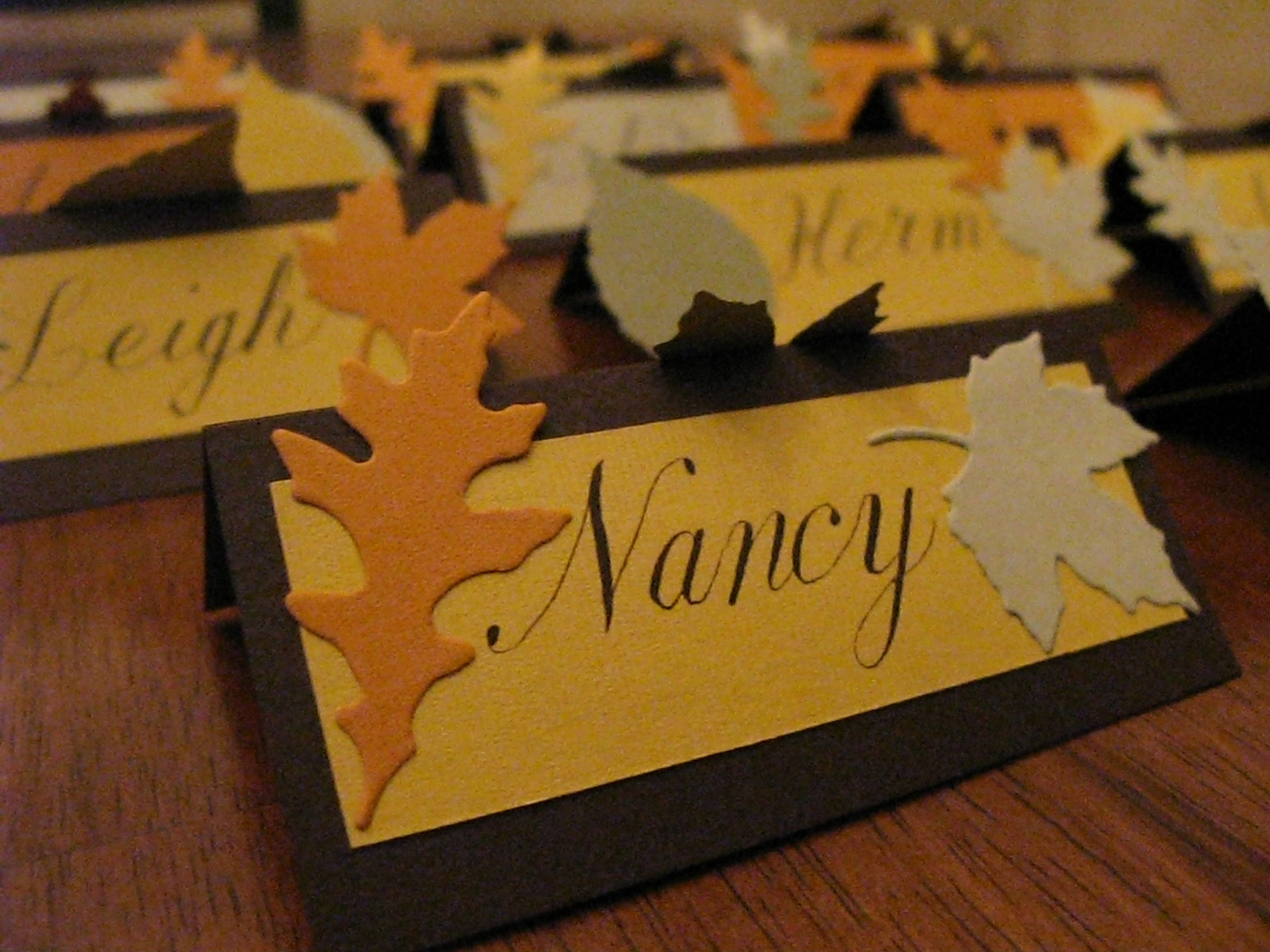
A group of place cards

A place card is a piece of paper indicating what table a guest at an event, such as a wedding or banquet, is assigned to sit. Place cards generally have the guest's name and table number, and frequently have some design as well to add style.

== Background ==
Place cards also serve the function of identification of those who may otherwise be unknown to one another. Once taken by the respective guests, they are placed at the assigned seat, and once there, this enables others to identify the person sitting in that seat by name.

At some weddings, place cards can double as the menu for the food that is served at the wedding.

Place cards are not only used for weddings and are not always pieces of paper. Theme based celebrations have become extremely popular for such party celebrations as Bar and Bat Mitzvah celebration meals, as well as birthdays, sports banquets, anniversaries, retirements, corporate events, etc. Custom place cards coordinated with the celebrant's theme have become very popular as well.

Place cards can be decorated to fit the party's theme. For example, if the theme of the wedding or party is a beach theme, the card might have a tropical flower on it. Cards can also indicate tables using token objects. Sea shells, party gifts, color of the tablecloth, plates or cups on the table may be used to identify the assigned table.

Place cards have a long history, dating back to ancient civilizations where they were used for various purposes, such as divination and game playing. The earliest known card game was played in China in the 9th century, and cards soon spread to other parts of Asia, the Middle East, and Europe.

== Issues ==
Place cards, especially if fancy, can be an added expense for the couple.

The use of place cards in some circles may be controversial. Some guests may want to sit wherever they wish.

== See also ==
- Seating plan

== Bibliography ==
- Lenderman, Teddy. The Complete Idiot's Guide to the Perfect Wedding.
- Mancuso, Jennifer (2008). The Everything Guide to Being an Event Planner: Insider Advice on Turning your Creative Energy into a Rewarding Career. Avon, Massachusetts: Adams Media. ISBN 978-1-59869-417-8.
- Scardina Becker, Joyce (2006). Countdown to Your Perfect Wedding: From Engagement Ring to Honeymoon, a Week-by-Week Guide to Planning the Happiest Day of Your Life. New York: St. Martin's Griffin. ISBN 978-0-312-34845-8.
