= Seating assignment =

Scheme utilized for seating groups of individuals

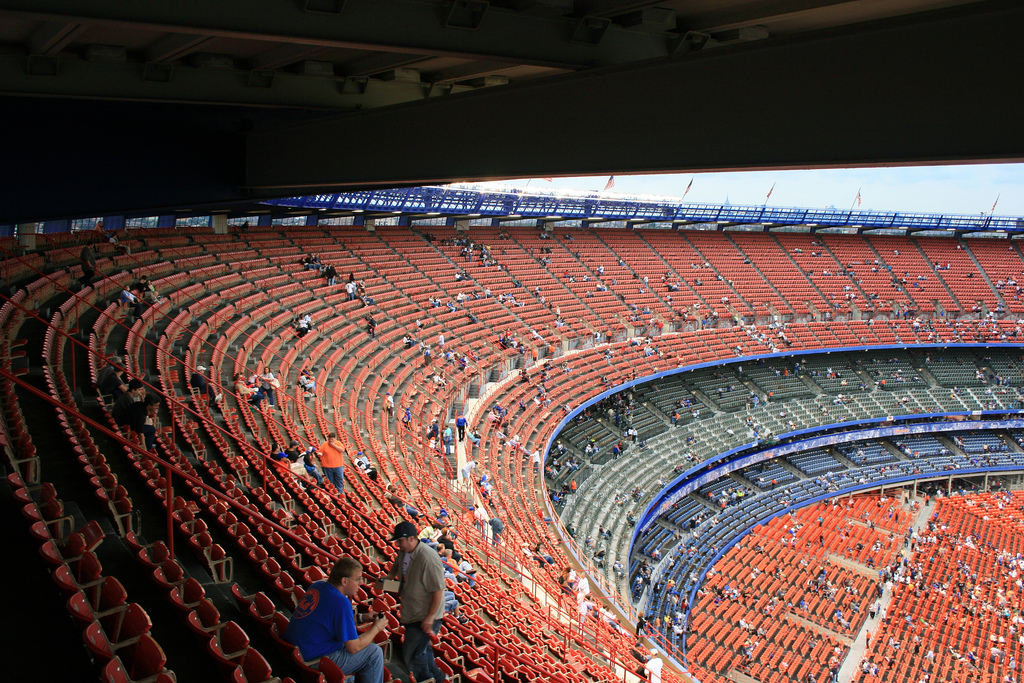
Seating arrangement in Shea Stadium

In live entertainment there are several possible schemes for the seating assignment of spectators, including completely unassigned seating. There are several schemes most commonly used, though there are no firm rules, and alternate or modified schemes are sometimes used.

== Reserved seating ==
In a purely reserved seating (also known as allocated seating or assigned seating) scheme, each ticket is assigned a specific seat in the venue at the time of purchase. Seats are typically identified by row number/letter, seat number and sometimes by section.

Reserved seating is the most common scheme used for large indoor venues such as stadia, arenas, and larger theatres. It is also common at other venues, as are other seating schemes, such as outdoor amphitheatres.

== General admission ==
In a general admission (also known as open seating or free seating) scheme, each spectator has a ticket. The location where they will sit is determined upon arrival at the venue. General admission is most commonly employed in seat-less venues, such as outdoor festival shows and smaller club shows. It is also sometimes used in seat-less sections of events that would otherwise have reserved seating (standing-room only sections, including the floor section(s) at some concerts). In some general admission events, a ticket may assign the holder a specific section of the venue (e.g., balcony or floor), with the choice of seat within that section.

General admission can also refer to a scheme in which seating is available, but is not pre-assigned. Typically in this scheme, seat selection is on a first-come, first-served basis. A common example of this scheme is most movie theatres in the United States.

General admission events may be ticketed with no assigned seat number, or it may be purely first-come, first-served, in which the first certain number of people in line are admitted (either as a free event, or paying at the door/gate). Due to the first-come, first-served nature of the seating selection, line-ups may still form for pre-ticketed events.

=== Festival seating ===
Festival seating typically refers to the form of general admission (first-come, first-served) in which there is a large open area (generally outdoors) and all spectators must stand (unless they are permitted to bring their own portable seating). Many music acts use festival seating because it allows the most enthusiastic fans to get near the stage and generate excitement for the rest of the crowd. Some performers and bands insist on a festival seating area near the stage.

On December 3, 1979, the Riverfront Coliseum in Cincinnati, Ohio, was the site of one of the worst rock concert tragedies in United States history. Eleven fans were killed and several dozen others injured in the rush for seating at the opening of a sold-out concert by The Who. The concert was using festival seating. When the crowds waiting outside heard the band performing a soundcheck, they thought the concert was beginning and charged the still-closed doors, trampling those at the front of the crowd.

The tragedy was blamed on poor crowd control, mainly the failure of arena management to open enough doors to deal with the crowd outside. As a result, concert venues across North America switched to assigned seating or changed their rules about festival seating. Cincinnati immediately outlawed festival seating at concerts, although it overturned the ban on August 4, 2004, since the ban was making it difficult for Cincinnati to book concerts. (In 2002, the city had made a one-time exception to the ban, allowing festival seating for a Bruce Springsteen concert; no problems were experienced.) Cincinnati was the only city in the US to outlaw festival seating altogether.

=== Lawn seating ===
"Lawn seating" refers to a seating method where concert-goers sit on the grass in the rear of the venue. Attendees can sometimes bring their own chairs or rent them from vendors at the concert.

== See also ==
- Place card
- Seating capacity
- Seating plan
