= Lizzie Post =

American writer and expert on modern manners

- Occupation: writer
- Known for: frequently quoted expert on manners

Lizzie Post is an American writer whose opinion on evolving changes in modern manners is frequently cited.

Post is a great-great-grandchild of Emily Post, the author of a book on etiquette, published almost 100 years ago, which is still widely consulted today. Post is the co-president of the Emily Post Institute with her cousin Daniel Post Senning; she and other descendants have published updated versions of Emily Post's books. She has also published several books of her own, including Higher Etiquette a cheeky guide to the etiquette of sharing cannabis.

Following the fears triggered by Coronavirus disease 2019, and the precautions mandated to keep the public safe, Post has been asked how people can exercise precautions, while still remaining polite.

On April 10, 2020, The Los Angeles Times offered advice to readers on how to be polite when requesting other people you want them to abide by social distancing precautions. They quoted Post's reassurance that individuals are entitled to request that others back off, and quoted several suggested ways to word such requests.

On April 15, 2020, The Daily Beast offered advice on when and how readers could politely decline an invitation to participate in an online gathering, relying on Post's opinion that politely saying one could not participate was sufficient, even if the only reason was just a lack of interest in attending.

On April 23, 2020, Wired magazine wrote about the most tactful ways to offer condolences during the COVID-19 virus period, when one could not offer them in person. They quoted Post's advice to do one's best to bear in mind what the friend or acquaintance really wanted. Messages should explicitly say you do not need them to make the effort to reply. Facebook was a less recommended way of contacting the bereaved, but could be used if it was the only way one had to contact them.

On April 24, 2020, Atlantic magazine, noting how false the traditional answer of "fine" could seem, offered advice on how to respond to the greeting "How are you?". They quoted Post, noting how Emily Post adapted her advice to the exceptional circumstances of wartime, suggesting readers had the option to offer more candid replies.

On May 1, 2020, Digiday quoted Post's advice on whether it was polite for individual participating in an online meeting, via Zoom, or another videotelephony platform, should feel free to drink beverages. She advised that drinking soft drinks, like tea or coffee, was acceptable, provided one was able to avoid "slurping".
