= Ruthrauff & Ryan =

American advertising agency of the 20th century

Ruthrauff & Ryan was a prominent American advertising agency founded in 1912. Clients included A. H. Lewis' Tums brand, American Airlines, Campbell Soup's Franco American brand, Canadian Pacific, Cocomalt, Dodge Brothers, Dr Pepper, Gillette Safety Razor Company, Goodrich Rubber, Lehn and Fink, Lever Brothers' Rinso, Lifebuoy, and Spry brands, Noxzema Chemical Company, Packard Motor Car Company, Pennzoil, Quaker Oats, and Wm. Wrigley Jr. Company. The principals included Wilbur B. Ruthrauff and Fritz Ryan. By 1957 they'd merged with another agency; the merged agency closed in 1964.

According to Advertising Age, the agency was during its heyday one of the most powerful in the industry.

== Principals ==
Wilber B. Ruthrauff and Frederick "Fritz" Ryan were both graduates of Yale, Ruthrauff in 1904 and Ryan in 1909. Ruthrauff had worked as a rent collector and Ryan as a real estate salesman. They met in Cape Cod in 1910 or 1911.

== Prominent campaigns ==
Ruthrauff wrote a prominent ad campaign for the Roth Memory Course. The ads featured a businessman greeting another with, "Of course--I remember you: Mr. Addison Sims of Seattle". The ads convinced American business people that a memory for names was an essential business skill, and "Mr. Addison Sims" entered the vernacular.

Copywriter John Caples created an ad for the U.S. School of Music, They Laughed When I Sat down at the Piano, But When I Started to Play! was named in 1976 by Advertising Age as one of the ten greatest ads ever created and has been listed in Julian Watkins' book of 100 greatest ads perennially.

The agency's campaigns for Dale Carnegie's How to Win Friends and Influence People turned it into a bestseller.

The agency specialized in mail order campaigns. In 1919 agency copywriter Lillian Eichler, then 18, created the prominent campaign Again She Orders..."A Chicken Salad, Please". Eichler also created Ruthrauff & Ryan's campaign for Lifebuoy that in 1933 was called out by Advertising and Selling for doing a "public service" by "scaring so many about B.O." Eichler also created many of the agency's influential ads for Cocomalt, which pivoted the brand's approach to selling the stir-in vitamin supplement from focusing on "images of children spotlighted in sunshine" to ads in which mothers suffered social embarrassment because their malnourished children misbehaved in public.

Ruthrauff & Ryan's ads for Dodge were credited with increasing their share of market from 9th place to 4th.

== History ==
The agency opened in 1912, primarily doing mail order advertisements in their early years, including for products that were "faintly disreputable" such as patent medicines. By the 1920s it had become an important player in the industry and by the 1930s had a prestigious client list. In 1939 the agency's offices "flourished mightily" in the Chrysler Building, according to Ken. Advertising Age said the agency was "at its peak" in the 1930s and 1940s. In 1957 they merged with Erwin, Wasey & Co. to form Erwin, Wasey, Ruthrauff & Ryan. The agency closed in 1964.

== Impact and approach ==
Advertising and Selling coined the term "Ruthrauff-and-Ryanism" to describe a style of advertising that targeted the average consumer in a style that was "inelegant and hard-selling". The agency was known for its skill marketing to the middle class and those aspiring to the middle class; a popular saying in the industry was "Young & Rubicam for the classes, Ruthrauff & Ryan for the masses." Their offices featured a mural showing a "sea of faces", meant to symbolize "the masses", accompanied by the agency credo: "This is your market. To sell them you must know them."

In 1930 Ruthrauff gave an interview to Printers' Ink Monthly in which he described the Great Depression as having a "distinctly healthful" influence on advertising as it had encouraged the development of advertising that focussed on the practical and moved away from idealism and "lovely copy."

Ruthrauff & Ryan's ads for their own work include, in Fortune, a description of their mass-appeal approach:

Many an advertiser has found himself on the wrong side of the ledger because, in framing his sales to the mass market, he endowed prospects with refinement and subtlety which in reality they do not possess. Our choice of advertising appeals, therefore, must embody concession to popular taste. This kind of advertising may seem too down-to-earth at times, but it sells!

The agency coined the term "B.O." for its Lifebuoy ads to solve the problem of readers being offended by the term "body odor". The acronym entered the American lexicon.
