= Daniel Post Senning =

American etiquette expert

Daniel Post Senning (born c. 1978) is an American etiquette expert. He is the co-president of the Emily Post Institute, founded by his great-great-grandmother Emily Post.

== Early life and career ==
Senning attended Pomona College, where he participated in the guerilla founding of the Pomona College Organic Farm and graduated with a degree in molecular biology in 1999. He began his career in modern dance, touring with the Laurie Cameron Company. He taught contact improv with the Beijing Modern Dance Company.

== Etiquette career ==
Senning joined the Emily Post Institute in 2008 in an entry-level administrative role. In December 2016, he was named its co-president alongside his cousin Lizzie Post, becoming the fifth generation in his family to run the institute since its founding by Emily Post, a socialite who became famous for her writings about etiquette.

Senning co-authored the 19th edition of Emily Post's Etiquette. He has been widely quoted in the media as an expert on etiquette in various settings, including the workplace, pandemics, and online spaces. Since 2014, he has co-hosted, with Lizzie Post, the Q&A podcast Awesome Etiquette, which is produced by American Public Media.

Senning advocates for the reframing of the idea of etiquette for contemporary society, responding to the notion that it is an outdated or elitist concept. He defines etiquette as a combination of manners, which are context-specific, and guiding principles, chiefly "consideration, honesty, and respect for others".

== Personal life ==
Senning lives in Duxbury, Vermont, with his wife Puja (née Gupta), whom he married in 2015. He has two daughters.
