= Again She Orders – "A Chicken Salad, Please" =

1921 advertisement

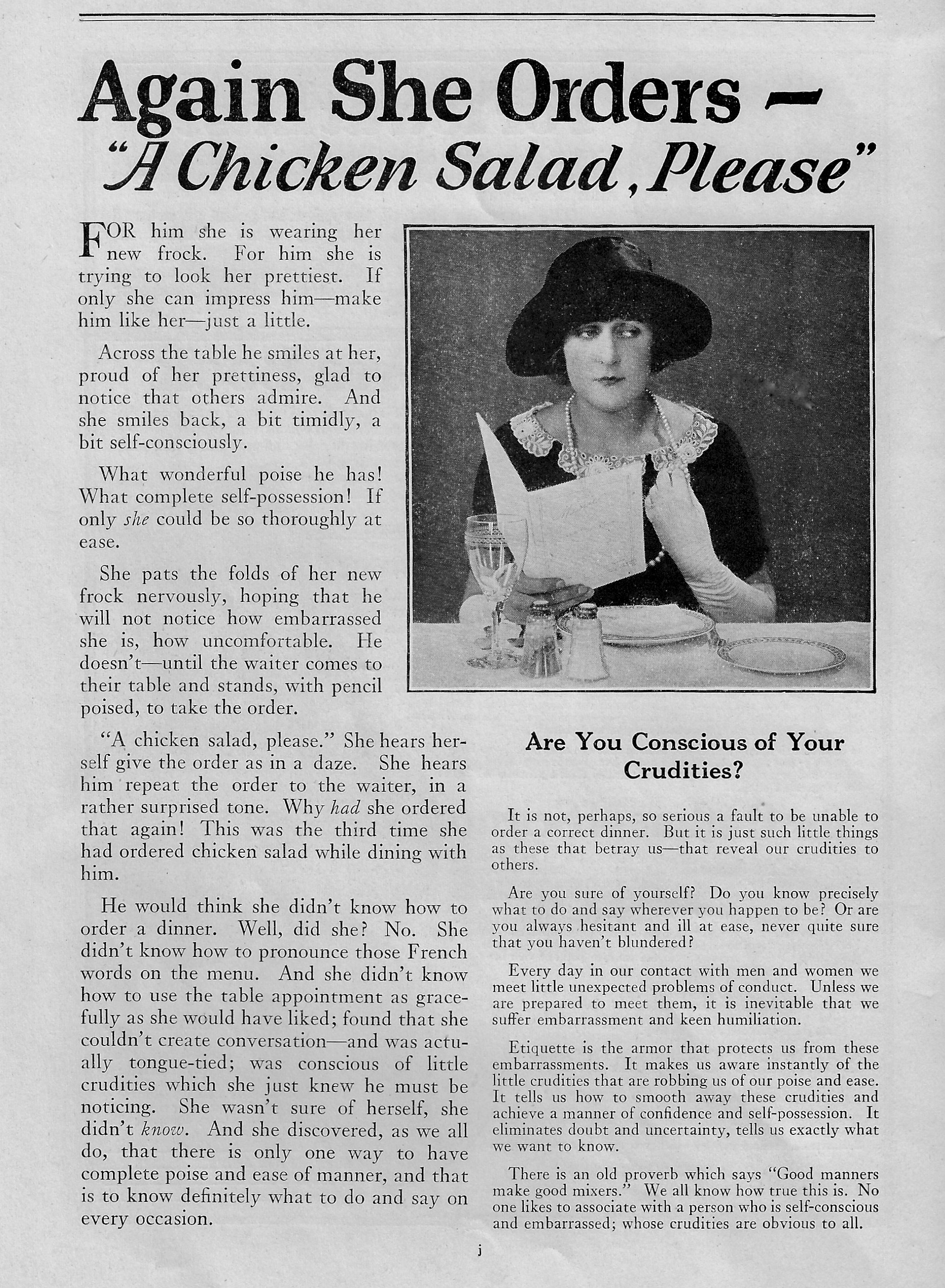
Again She Orders..."A Chicken Salad Please"

"Again She Orders – 'A Chicken Salad, Please'" is a 1921 advertisement for the two-volume Book of Etiquette. Both the book and the advertising campaign were written by American author and advertising copywriter Lillian Eichler Watson while still a teen.

Eichler was hired by Ruthrauf & Ryan in 1919. One of her first assignments was to write an advertisement selling the remaining copies of the pre-1900 Encyclopedia of Etiquette by Eleanor Holt. Her campaign was so successful that the original book's publisher, Doubleday, asked her to rewrite the book and create a campaign for the updated version.

Eichler created the advertisement for the revised book, retitled The Book of Etiquette. The advertisement portrayed the plight of a young woman who, on a date with a man she wants to impress, doesn't know how to order dinner in a fancy restaurant, which Victor Schwab said was effective because it "capsulized a common and embarrassing situation".

"A Chicken Salad, Please." She hears herself give the order as in a daze. She hears him repeat the order to the waiter, in a rather surprised tone. Why had she ordered that again! This was the third time she had ordered chicken salad while dining with him.

He would think she didn't know how to order a dinner. Well, did she? No.

The advertisement has been described as "sensationally successful" and has been included in Julian Watkins's The 100 Greatest Advertisements in its dozens of editions from the first in 1949 through the most recent in 2013. Schwab in 1962 noted that the ad was "so noteworthy and memorable" that the headline was still part of everyday speech.

The "chicken-salad girl" became a national reference point. Other headlines from the campaign were often quoted as well, including "What's Wrong in This Picture?", "Why I Cried After the Ceremony", "May She Invite Him into the House?", and "Suppose This Happened on Your Wedding Day?"
