= Higher Etiquette =

2019 book

- Author: Lizzie Post
- Subject: Cannabis etiquette
- Publisher: Ten Speed Press
- Publication date: 2019
- ISBN: 978-0399582394

Higher Etiquette: A Guide to the World of Cannabis, From Dispensaries to Dinner Parties is a book about cannabis etiquette by Lizzie Post.

== Reception ==
Publishers Weekly said, "Those new to the cannabis scene, or those curious about it, would do well to check out Post's work, directed as it is to a more enjoyable and stress-free experience for all involved."

== See also ==
- List of books about cannabis
