= Table manners in North America =

Etiquette and practices in North America

Table manners are the cultural customs and rules of etiquette used while dining. As in other areas of North American etiquette, the rules governing appropriate table manners have changed over time and differ depending on the setting.

== History ==
Table manners have an ancient and complex history, as each society has gradually evolved its system. Today, many of the behaviors that take place at the dinner table are deeply rooted in history. Much of the invention of modern manners was done during the Renaissance in Italy.

== In the home ==
Today, many families eat fast food without silverware and eat meals in front of the television or in the car rather than following past norms of gathering the family at the dining table for a meal. Critics claim that these changes have led to fewer opportunities to learn table manners in the home. Additionally, advancement of technology in recent years raises issues regarding smartphone use at the dining table. Opinions vary regarding whether the use of smartphones at the dining table is acceptable.

== Offenses ==
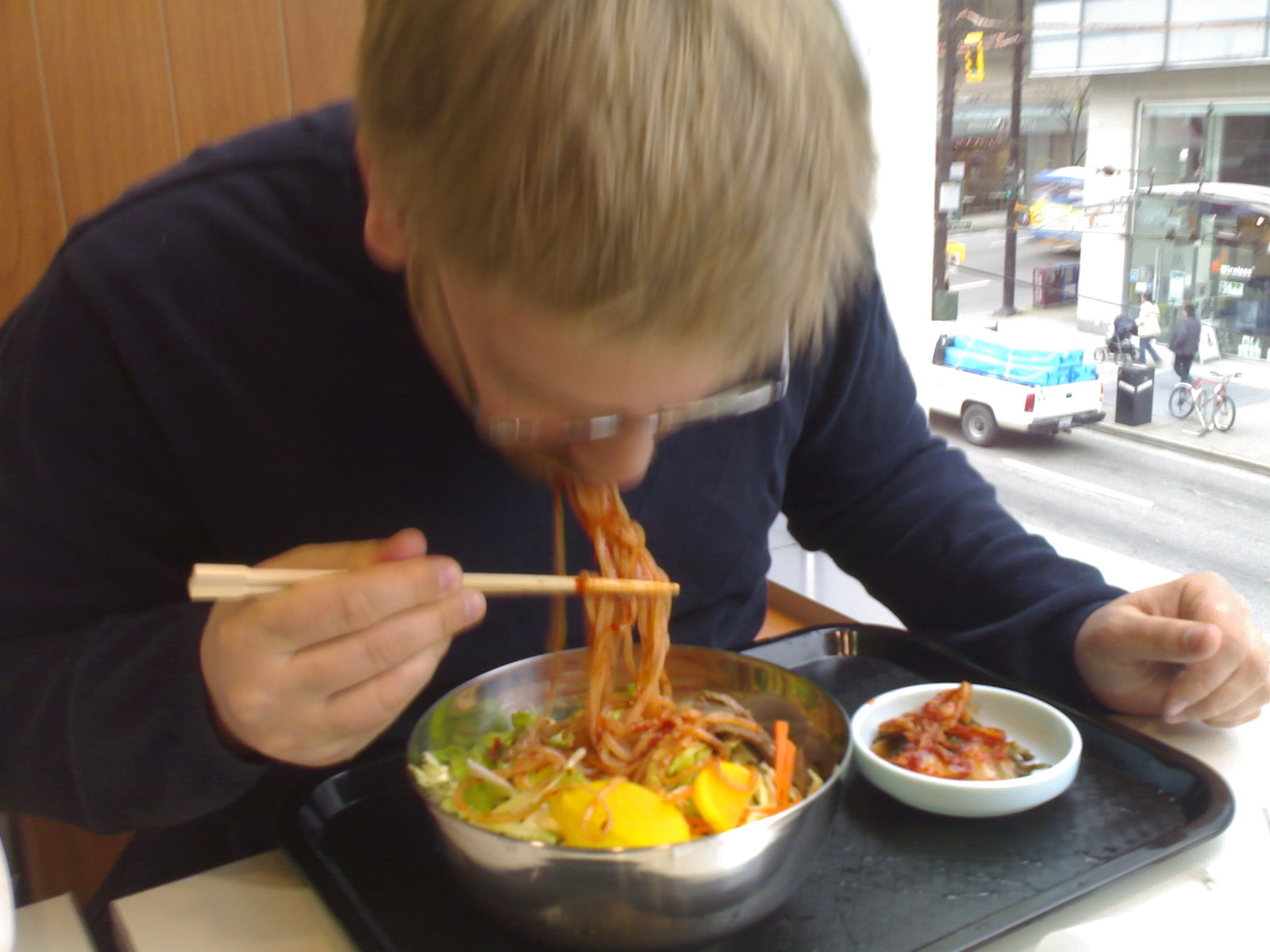
Slurping is an action that has been perceived differently by different cultures.

In most places, it is inappropriate for someone to make disapproving or disrespectful opinion when presented with food. Likewise, blowing one's nose at the table is impertinent.

== Business related ==
As business dealings can take place over a meal, table manners can be helpful while dining with clientele, co-workers, or subordinates – building rapport with a client, celebrating the accomplishments of a team, or simply hosting a discussion in a non-office setting all call for proper etiquette if dining is involved. It is deemed an essential enough behavioral skill that has suffered from a decline in naturally occurring generational inheritance to the effect that some schools have opened programs and classes centered around dining etiquette to educate students in the practice. Inappropriate table manners can affect the opinion of those involved, as well as the outcome of the meeting.

Many appropriate mannerisms from formal dining situations can be applied in a business setting, though variations exist depending on who is the host and who is the guest, and the relation the one has with the other. Speaking while still chewing or mid-bite may be acceptable in an informal lunch setting with often-seen coworkers, but in a high-stakes meeting with a potential customer, it will likely to be viewed as impolite. Napkins are intended to be kept in the lap. The exception is when leaving the table temporarily – placed on the chair signals the staff that the diner's meal is unfinished, placed on the table near the plate shows the patron has completed their meal.

Unless the host offers to pay the inevitable bill, it should be assumed that each diner is responsible for their own bill, and the staff (and table) should be made aware of this at the appropriate time. If one is not paying for their own meal, it is impolite to order expensive menu items - especially food more expensive than that of the paying person.

The dress code for a business related dining event can vary, usually around when the event takes place. The lunch period will likely find participants wearing what they wore to work, though special events may require a more scene-suitable dress. It is important to understand and attempt to match the formality of the event – this type of table manners begin prior to sitting down at the table.

== Restaurant ==
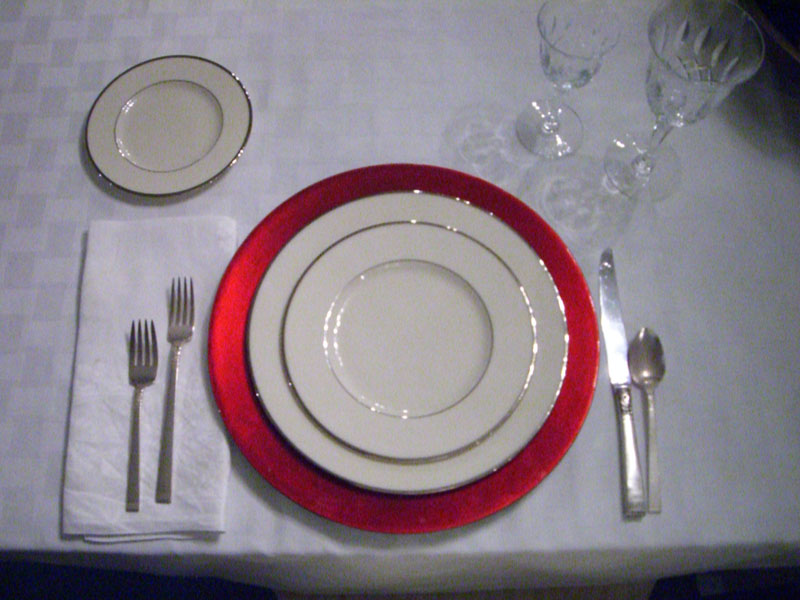
The basic place setting

The level of formality can vary depending on the formality of the restaurant.

Many restaurants set the table with a bread plate and water glass at each seat before patrons arrive. The bread plate goes to the left of the plate, and the beverage to the right.

== Statistics ==
One element of manners that has been the subject of debate is whether to use cell phones. According to a study done by the Pew Research Center, 38% percent of people think it is acceptable to use cell phones in restaurants, and that number gets even smaller depending on the occasion. 12% of people think it is OK to use cell phones at family dinners, and only 5% think it is appropriate during meetings.

When it comes to paying the bill in American restaurants, adding a tip is a common custom that is often expected by the waiter. According to a study by CreditCards.com, 4 out of 5 Americans always leave a tip when dining out, and the average tip is 16%–20% of the total bill.
