= Cannabis etiquette =

Conventional rules of behavior when consuming cannabis

Cannabis etiquette is the set of conventional rules of behavior when consuming cannabis.

== Smoking ==
Puff, puff, pass is a widely recognized rule of etiquette in cannabis culture that means taking two hits from a shared joint, blunt, or pipe before passing it to the next person in the circle.

"Bogarting" is holding a lit joint for too long without actually smoking, unnecessarily wasting the joint while preventing others from smoking.

== Books ==
- Higher Etiquette: A Guide to the World of Cannabis, From Dispensaries to Dinner Parties, Lizzie Post
