= Etiquette in Society, in Business, in Politics, and at Home =

Book by Emily Post

- Author: Emily Post
- Language: English
- Genre: Manners
- Publisher: Funk & Wagnalls Company
- Publication date: 1922
- Publication place: United States

Etiquette in Society, in Business, in Politics, and at Home (frequently referenced as Etiquette) is a book authored by Emily Post in 1922. The book covers manners and other social rules, and has been updated frequently to reflect social changes, such as diversity, redefinitions of family, and mobile technology. The 20th edition of Etiquette (2022), is authored by Post's descendants Lizzie Post and Daniel Post Senning.

== Legacy ==
- The sociologist Erving Goffman drew for his studies of ritual in everyday life on what he called Post as "a good source of half-analysed material...in the ritual idiom of a hypothetical class".
- In Joan Didion's 2005 book The Year of Magical Thinking, a memoir about the year following the death of her husband, she praises Emily Post for the practical wisdom of her chapter on funerals (Ch XXIV), especially in relation to the physiology of grief and distress.

== See also ==
- Pierre Bourdieu
- Politeness
