= Peggy Post =

American author

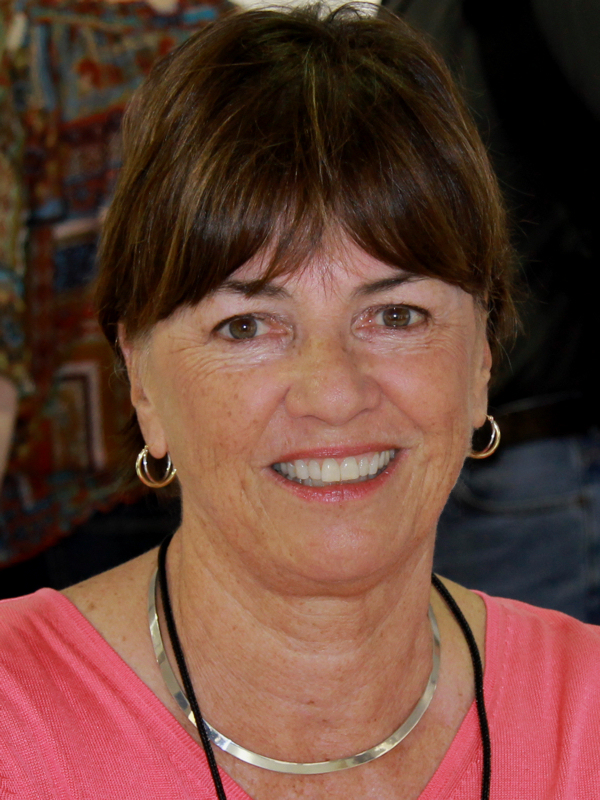
Peggy Post at the 2011 Texas Book Festival

Peggy Post is an American author and consultant on etiquette. She is Emily Post's great-granddaughter-in-law and continues her work as director and spokesperson for The Emily Post Institute in Vermont.

== Background ==
Post was born in Washington, D.C., and raised in Maryland and New Orleans. She finished Louisiana State University with a Bachelor of Science degree in education. She started her career as an international flight attendant for Pan American World Airways. After that she worked as a teacher for English and history in New York City. Later she entered a career in management, consulting and sales. Along with others she managed Chemical Bank in New York City.

Post married the investment consultant Allen Post who is Emily Post's great-grandson in 1979. Peggy raised two stepsons. In 1991, Peggy started to work with her mother-in-law Elizabeth Post who was the first successor to Emily Post and her granddaughter-in-law. Elizabeth Post revised Emily Post's Etiquette book five times between 1965 and 1992.

Post followed Elizabeth, who retired in 1995, as director and spokesperson of the Emily Post Institute. Today Peggy is author of more than twelve books including the 17th edition of Emily Post’s Etiquette, all published by HarperCollins. She writes columns for such magazines as Good Housekeeping, Parents, and USA Weekend.

Post's latest edition of Emily Post’s Etiquette includes not only an Attire Guide Beach Casual to White Tie but sections on appropriate e-mail manners, how to graciously discuss a potential sex partner's past and the circumstances under which one can re-gift in good conscience. In an interview she stated that she found out that discussions about people perceived as rude or uncivil leads to a search for a sense of order.
