= Hemicycle =

Semicircular, or horseshoe-shaped, debating chamber

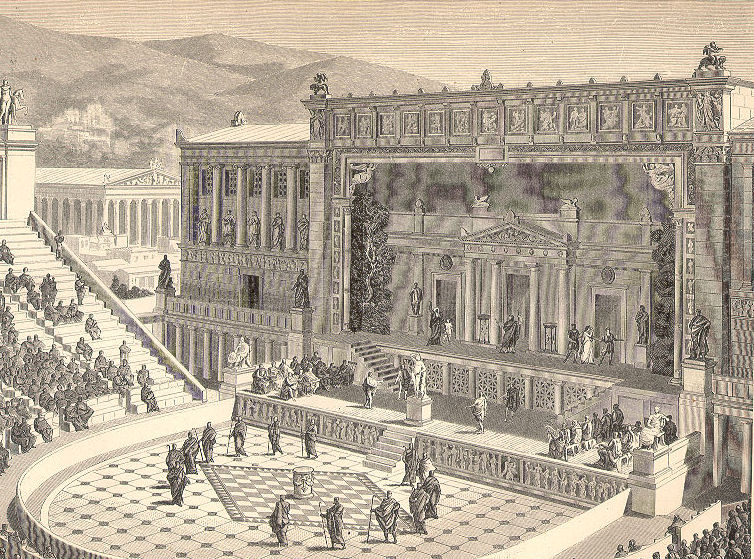
The Theatre of Dionysus, which hosted the Athenian Ecclesia, around the 4th century BCE

A hemicycle is a semicircular, or horseshoe-shaped, legislative debating chamber where members sit to discuss and vote on their business. Although originally of Ancient Greek roots, the term and modern design derive from French politics and practice.

== Usage ==
The circular shape is designed to encourage consensus among political parties rather than confrontation, such as in the Palace of Westminster, where the government and opposition parties face each other on opposing sets of benches. The design is used in most European countries (and hence was adopted by the European Parliament) and the United States.

The United Kingdom, which is the originator of the Westminster system, does not use a hemicycle. However, two of the three devolved legislatures, the Scottish Parliament and Senedd (Welsh Parliament), do, while the Northern Ireland Assembly is a hybrid "horseshoe” format.

== Arrangement ==
In the case of Australia (pictured below), the two largest parties still face each other, whereas in the Scottish Parliament's hemicycle, the largest party sits in the middle. However, some hemicycles follow a strict left–right arrangement with, for example, a left wing governing party sitting on the left and the right wing opposition on the right. In these cases, election results are often portrayed in the hemicycle to show the results of left wing or right wing coalitions (reaching 50% in the centre, where centrist third parties are located) for the formation of a majority.

== Variations ==
Some Westminster-system countries outside the UK, such as India, New Zealand and Australia, have confrontational benches, but the end segment is curved to create a partial hemicycle; while other countries, such as the People's Republic of China, have a single set of benches facing towards a stage area (which reflects the one-party system in operation there).

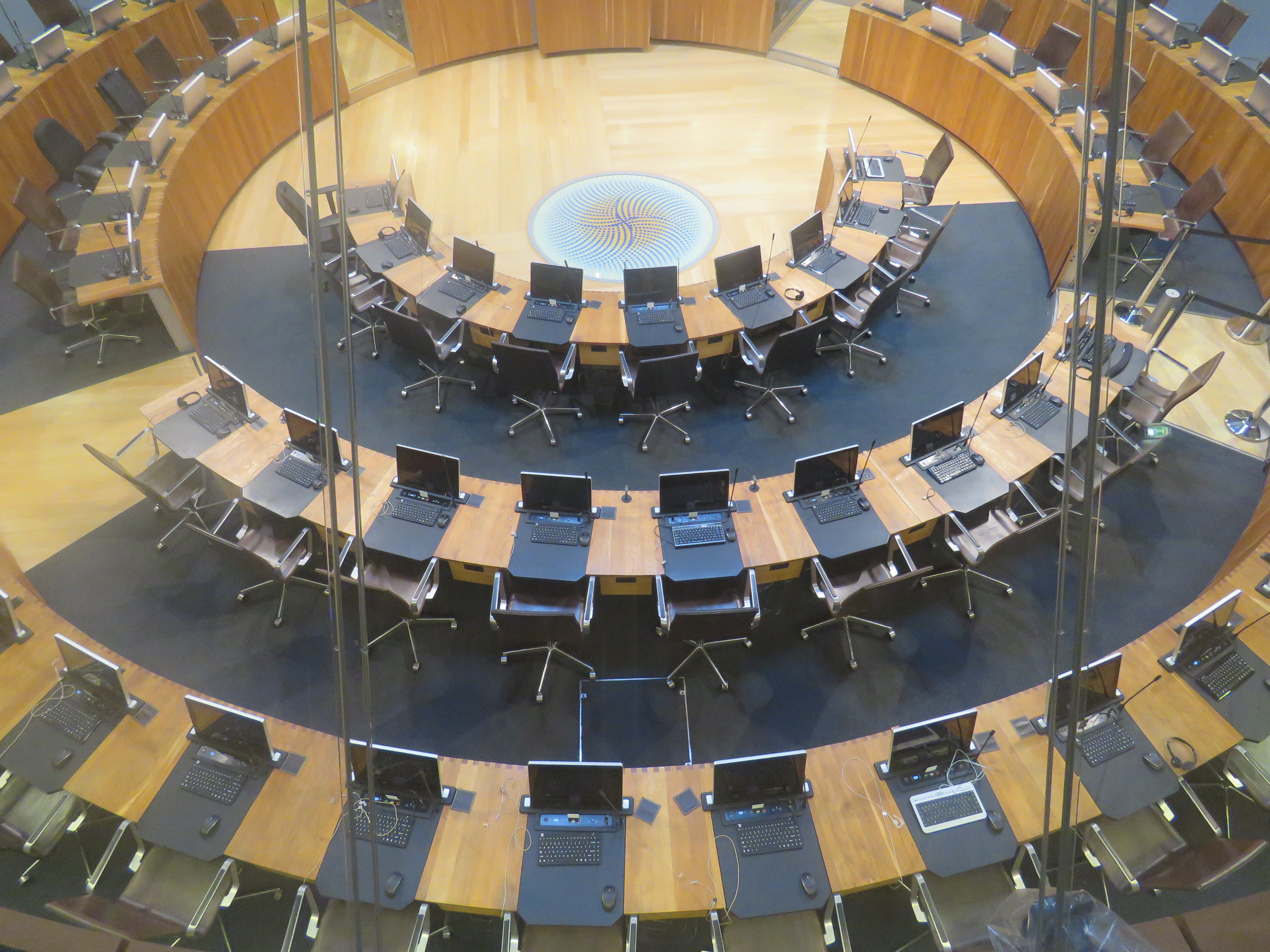
Semicircular Siambr in the Senedd (Welsh Parliament)

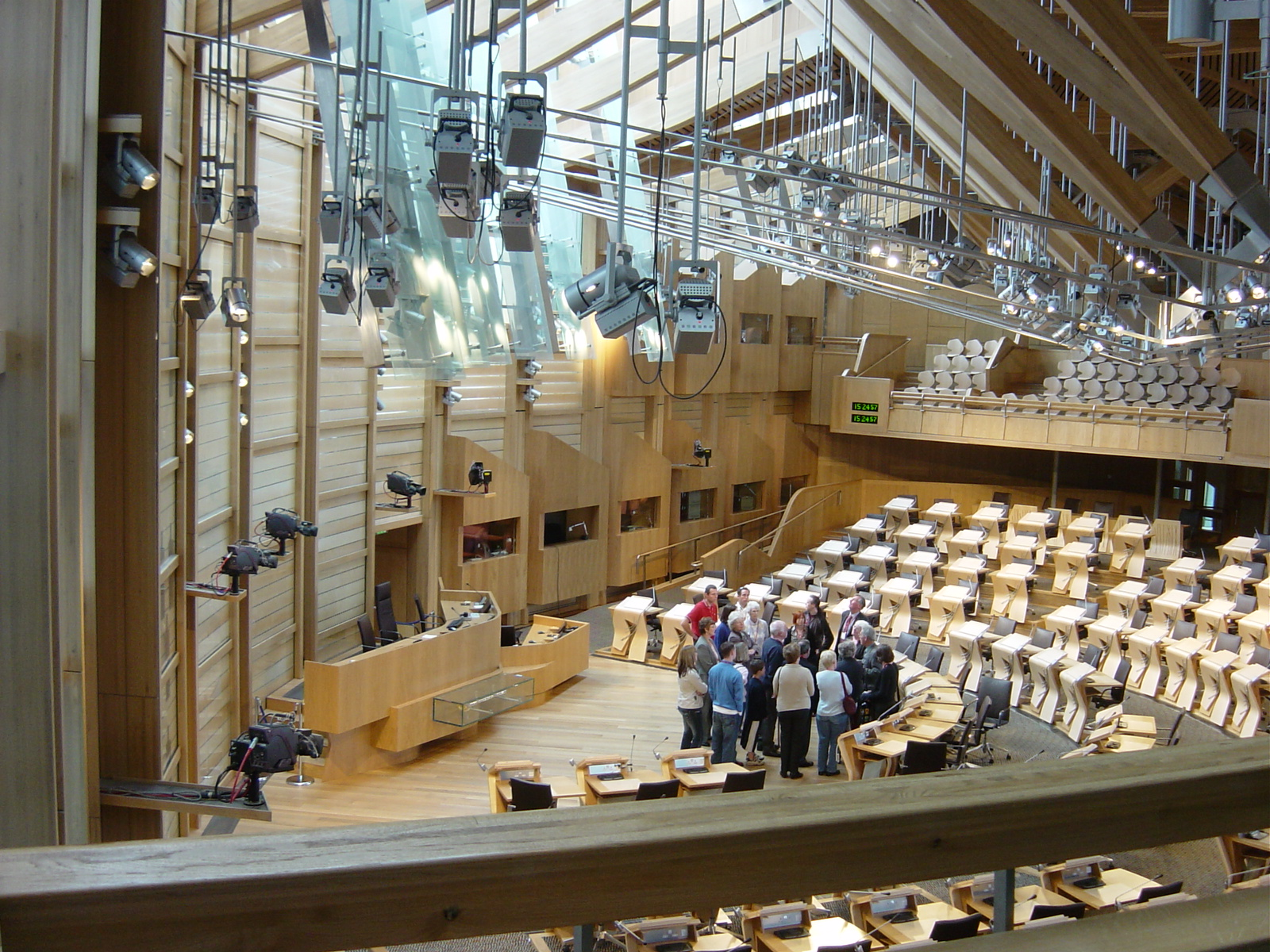
Debating chamber in the Scottish Parliament

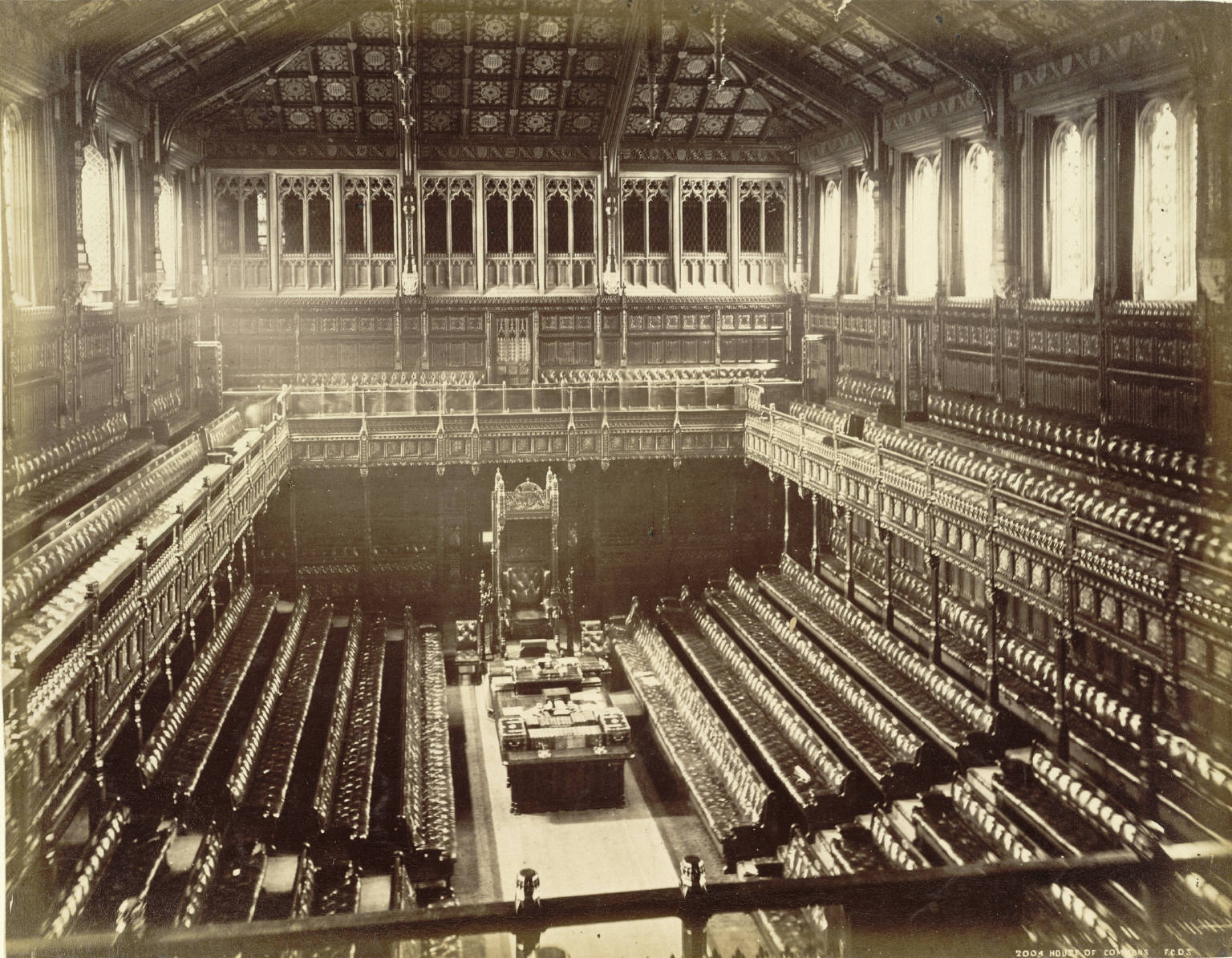
The British House of Commons with its Westminster-style benches (old chamber shown)

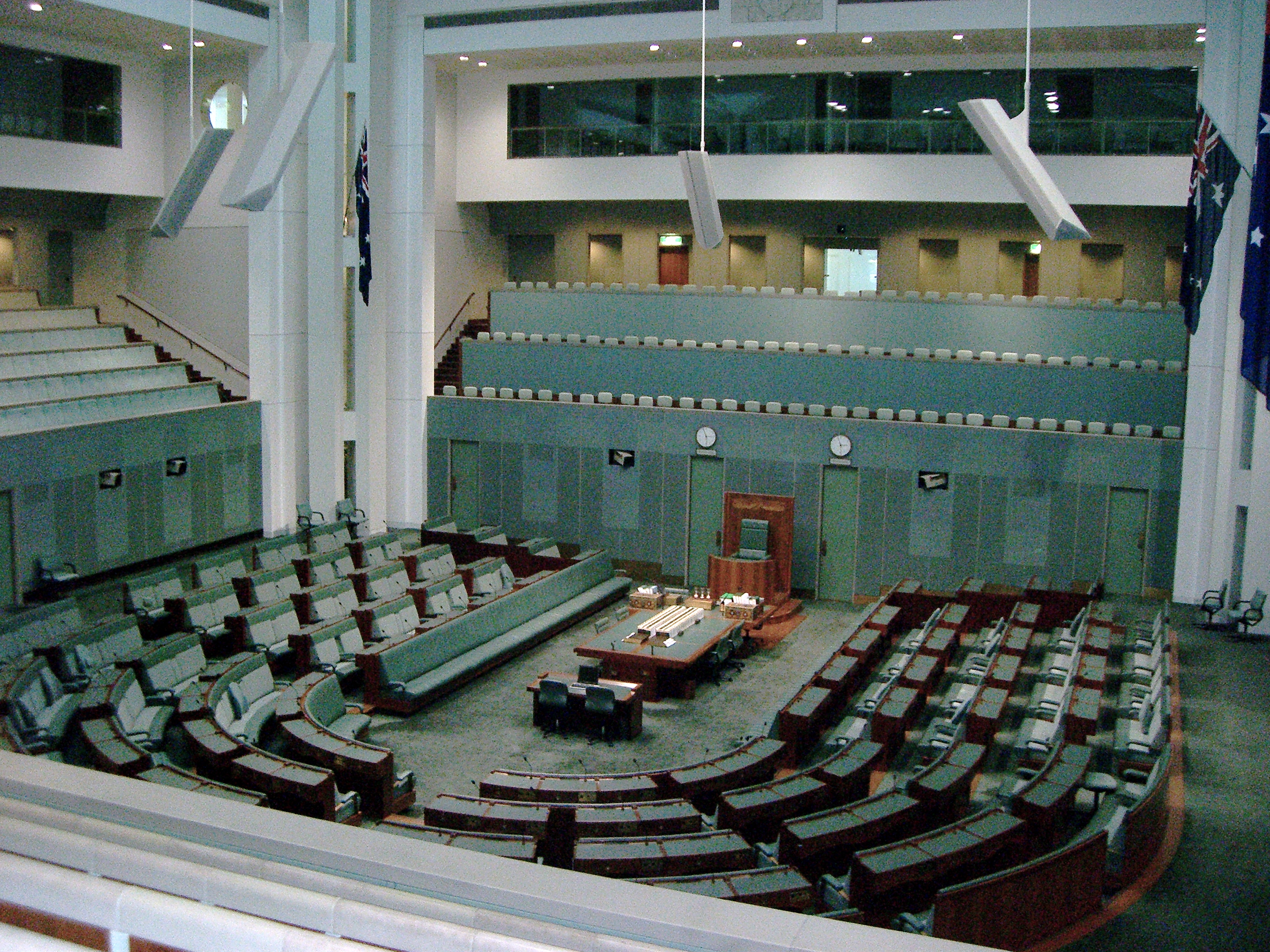
The Australian House of Representatives, arranged in a hybrid format

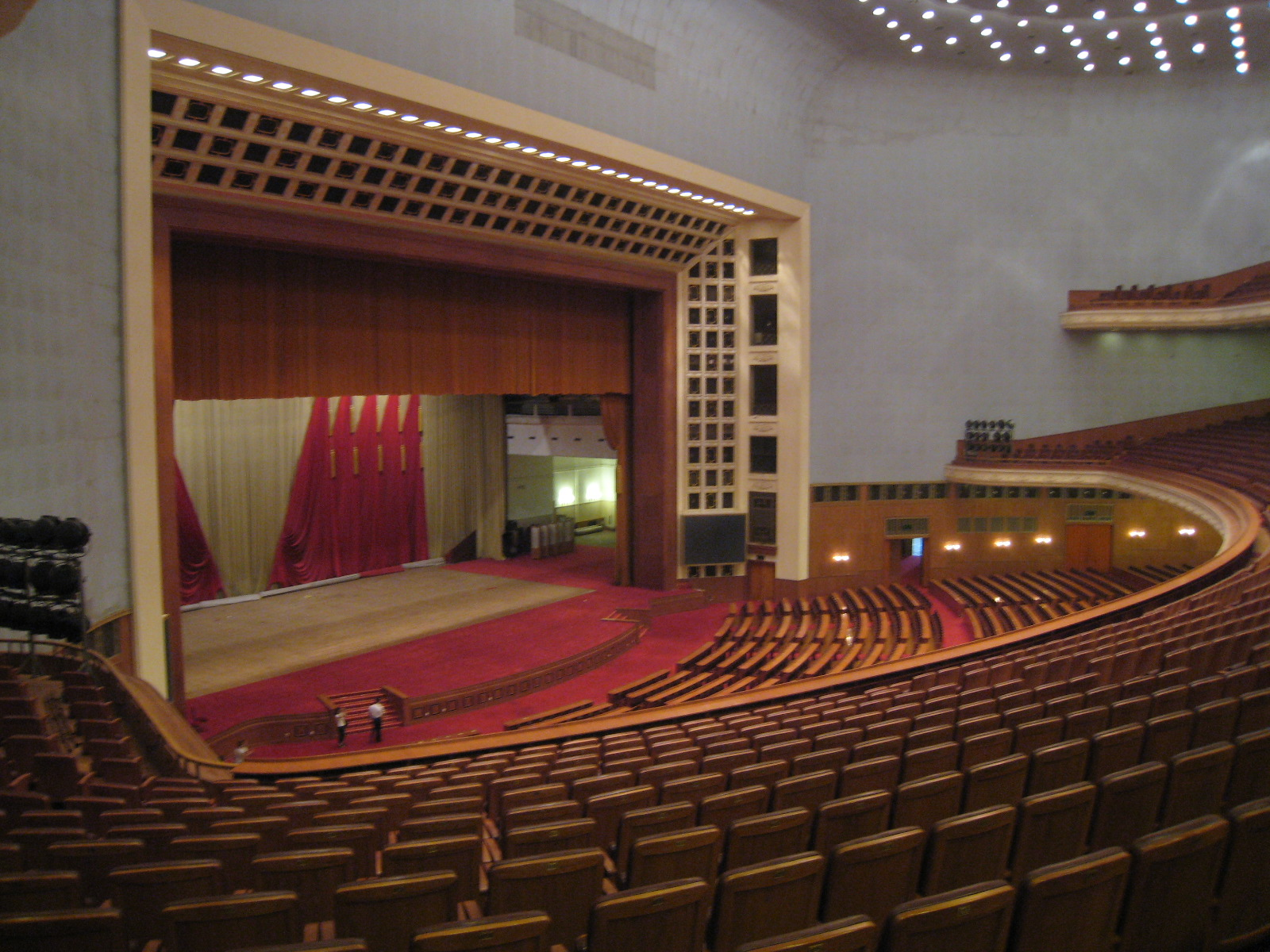
The Chinese National People's Congress, with benches facing a stage

== Gallery ==
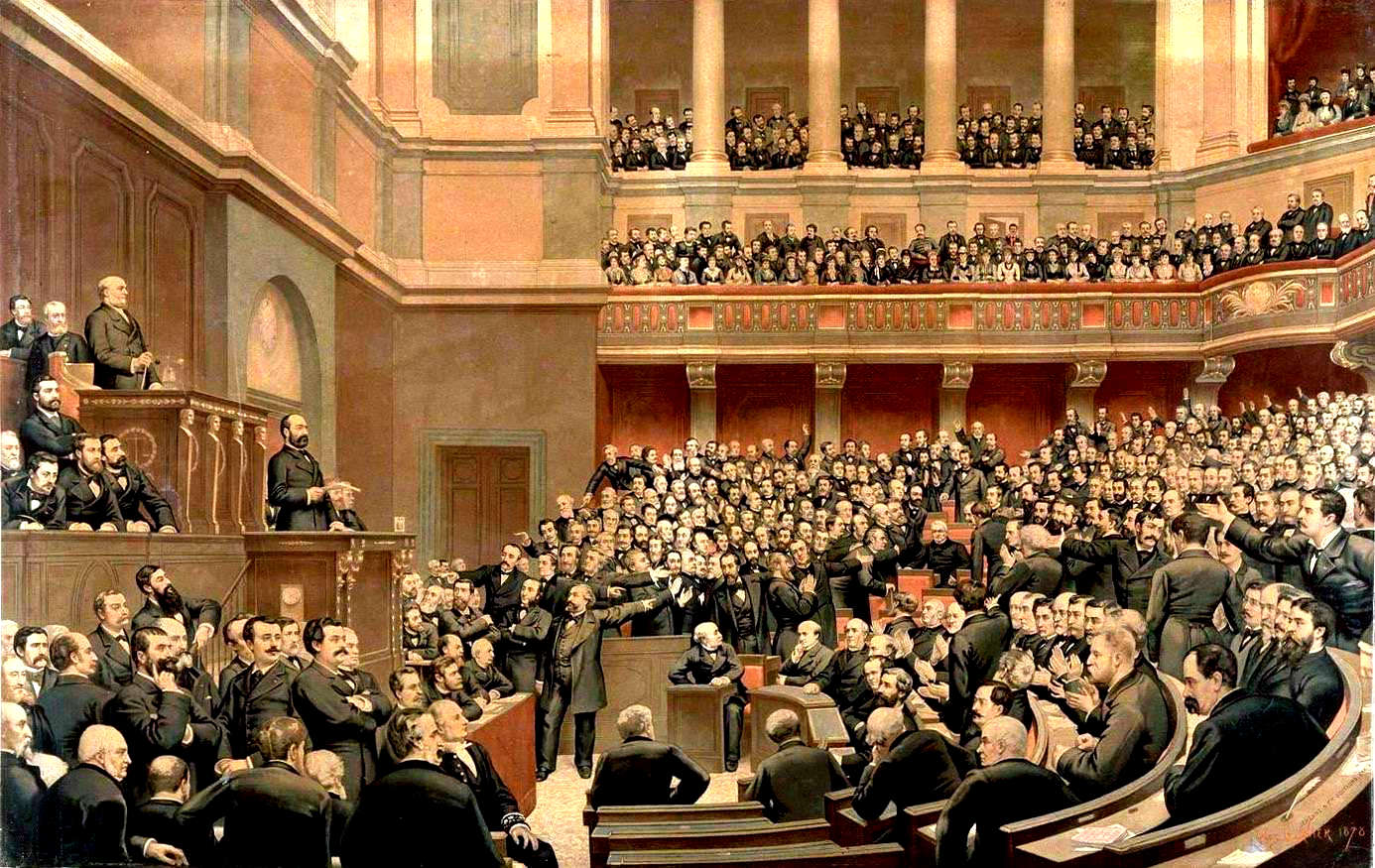
The French National Assembly in 1877; it entrenched the left–right political spectrum of its chamber in modern politics.

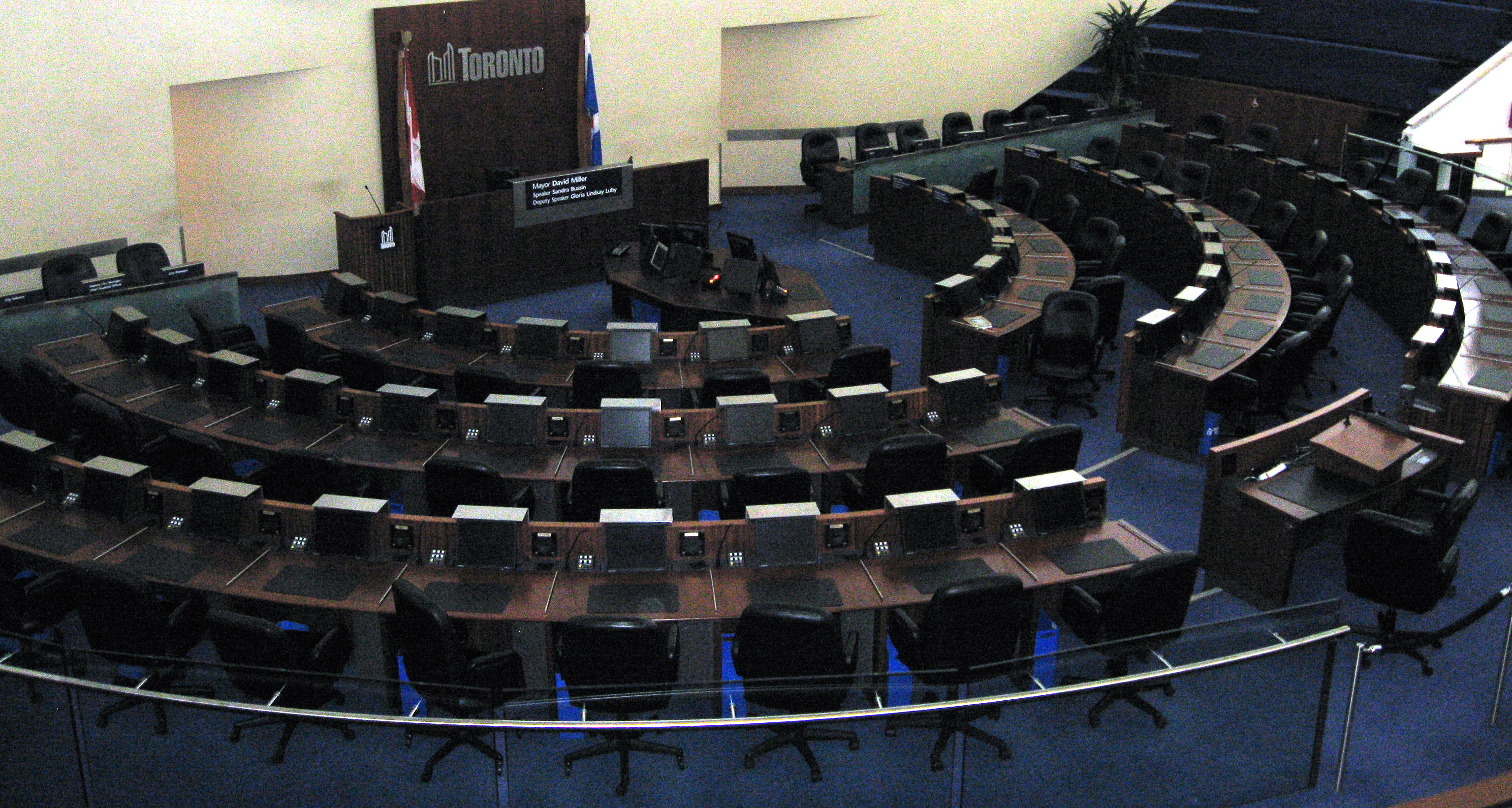
Toronto City Council chambers

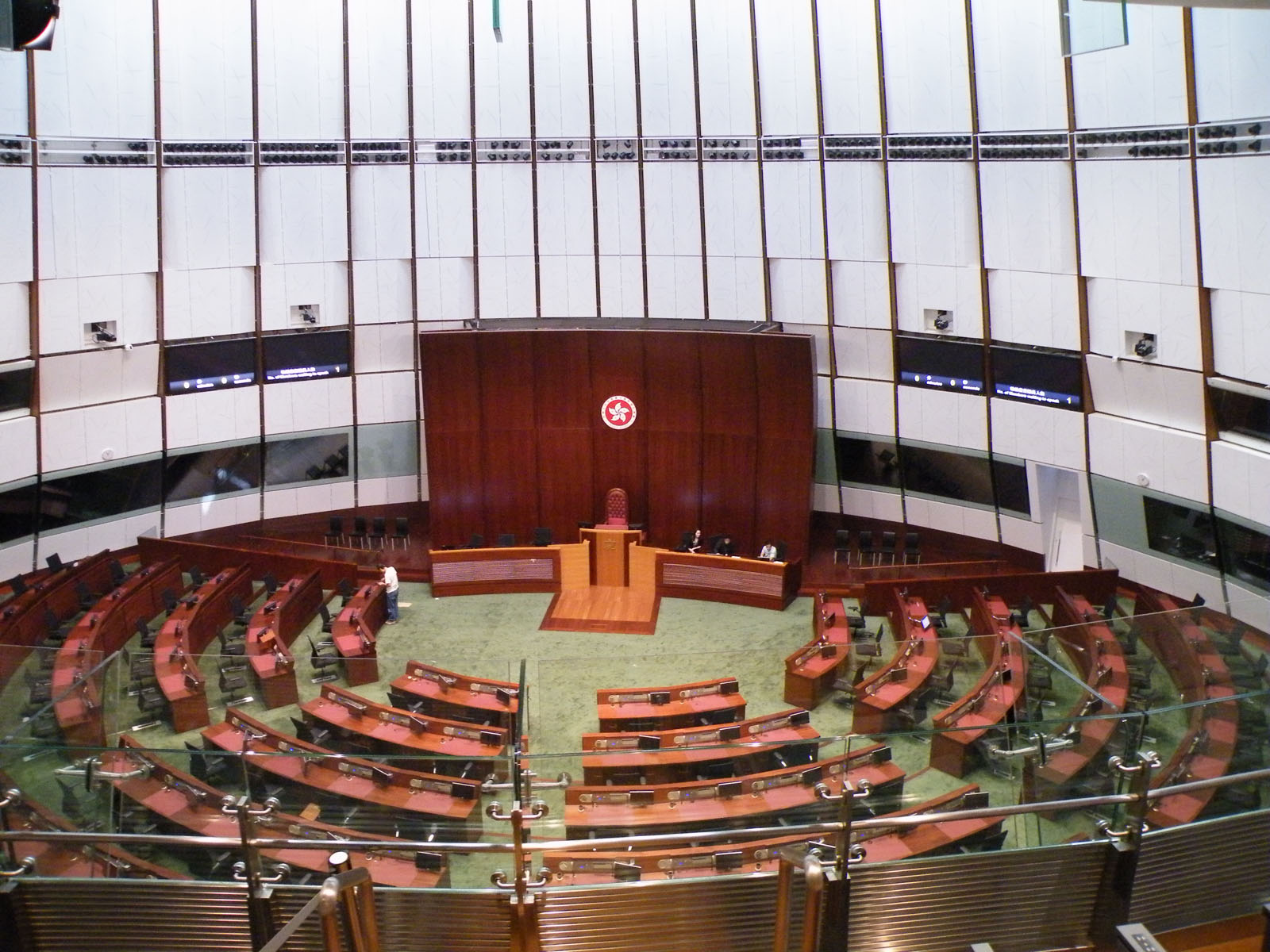
Hong Kong Legislative Council chambers

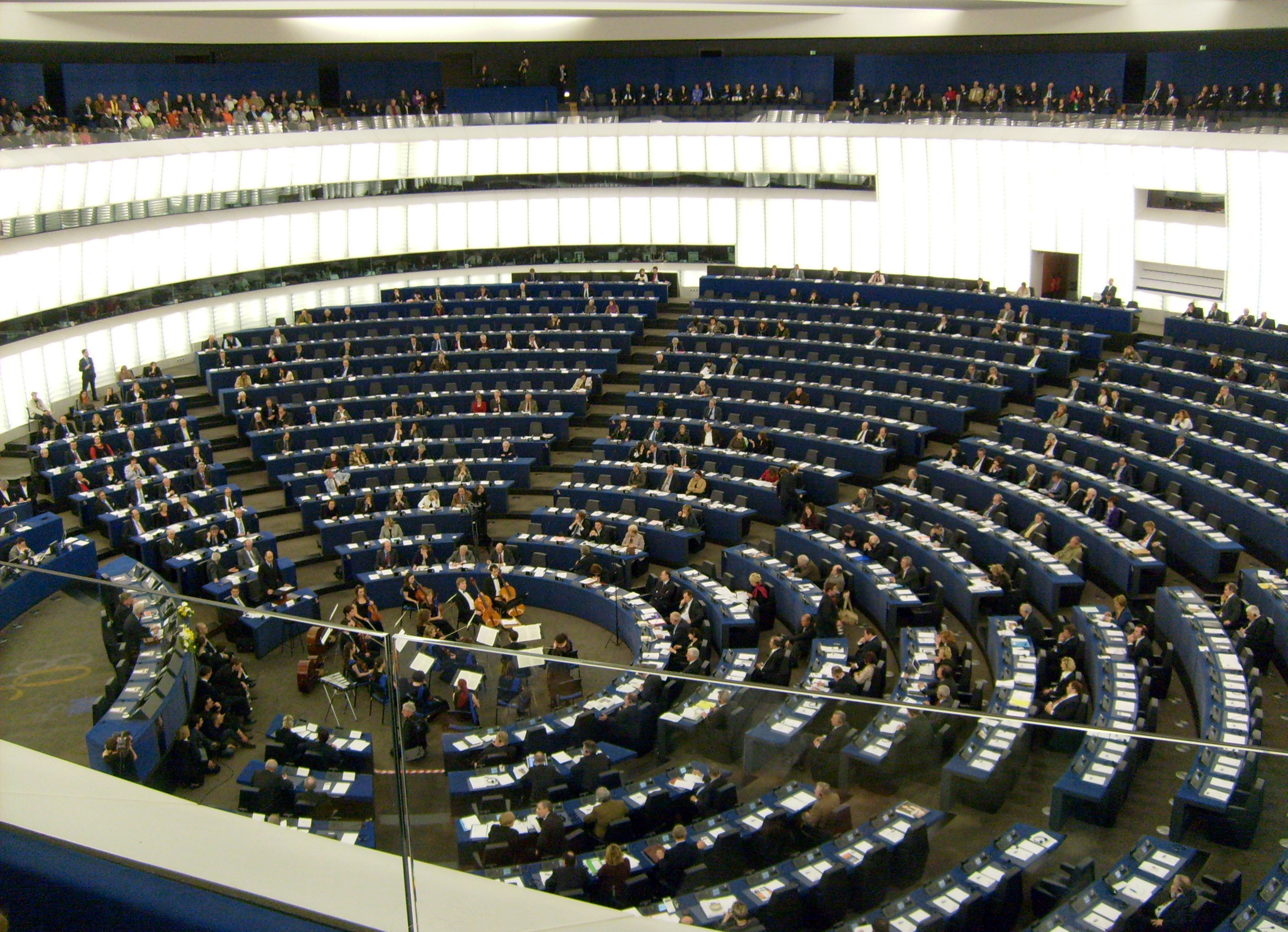
The European Parliament, seen in 2006, began operating in a hemicycle from its foundation in 1958, based on European traditions.

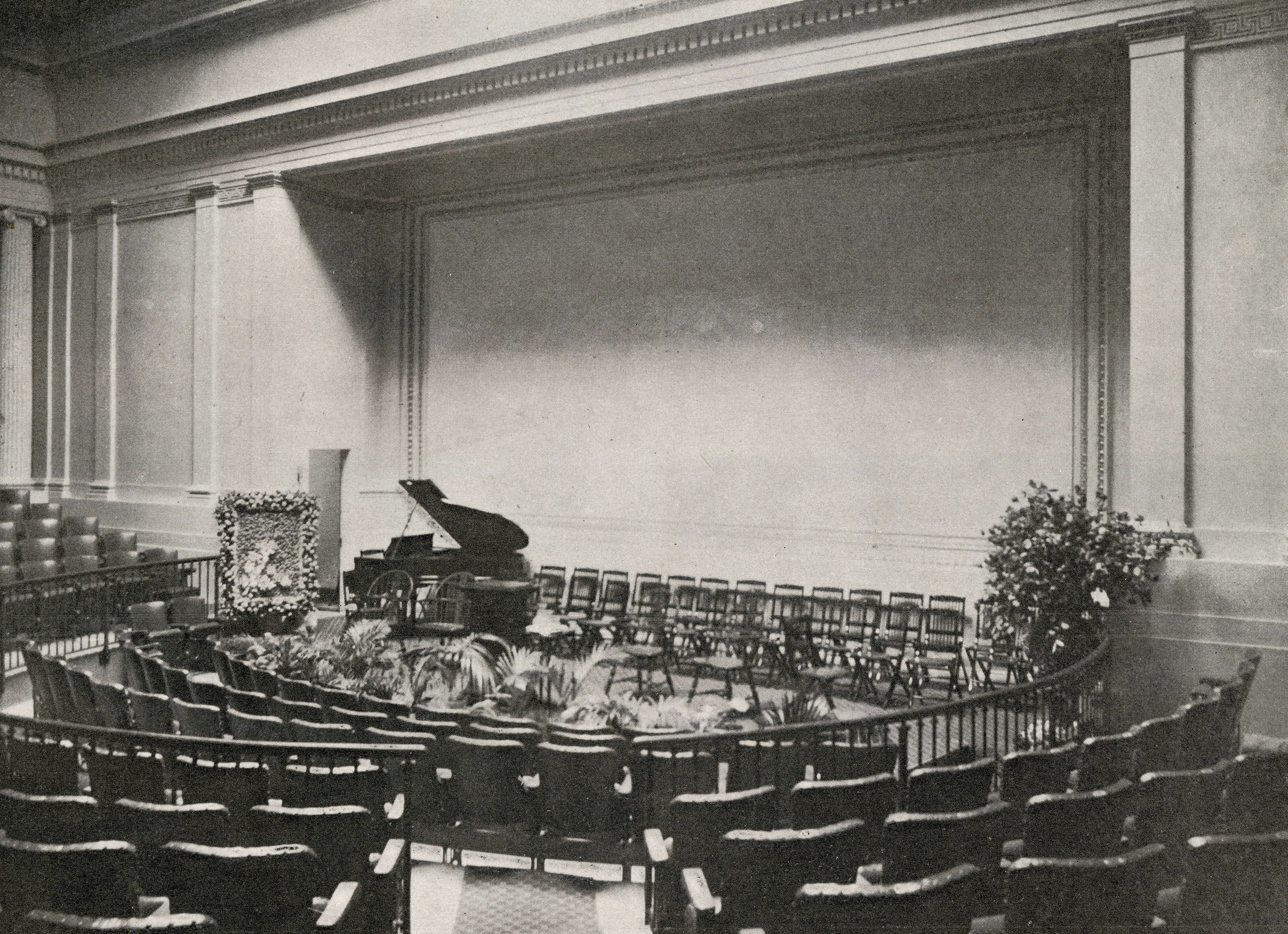
The Toledo Museum of Art once contained a performance space called the Hemicycle, seen here in 1912.

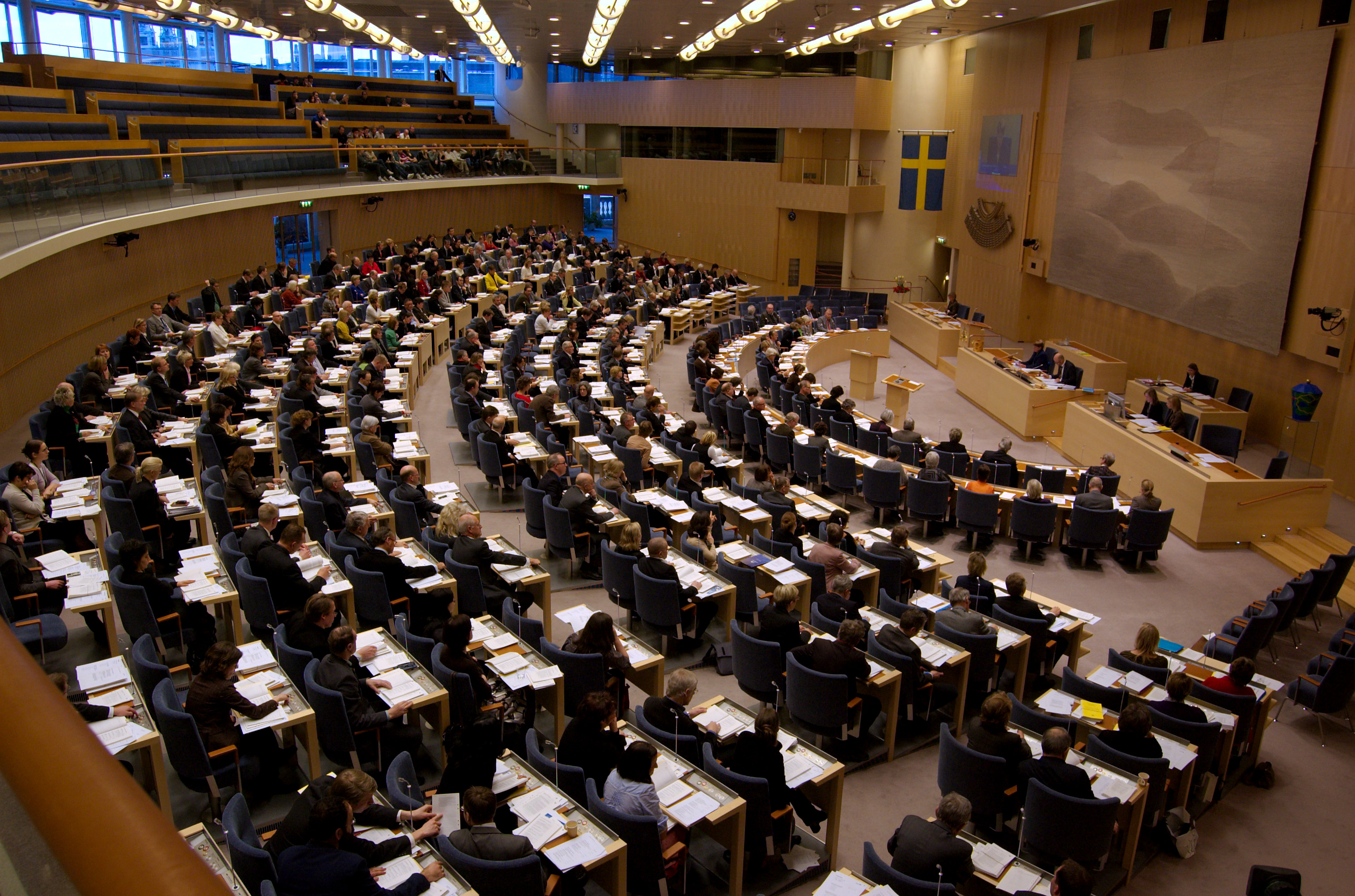
Parliament of Sweden

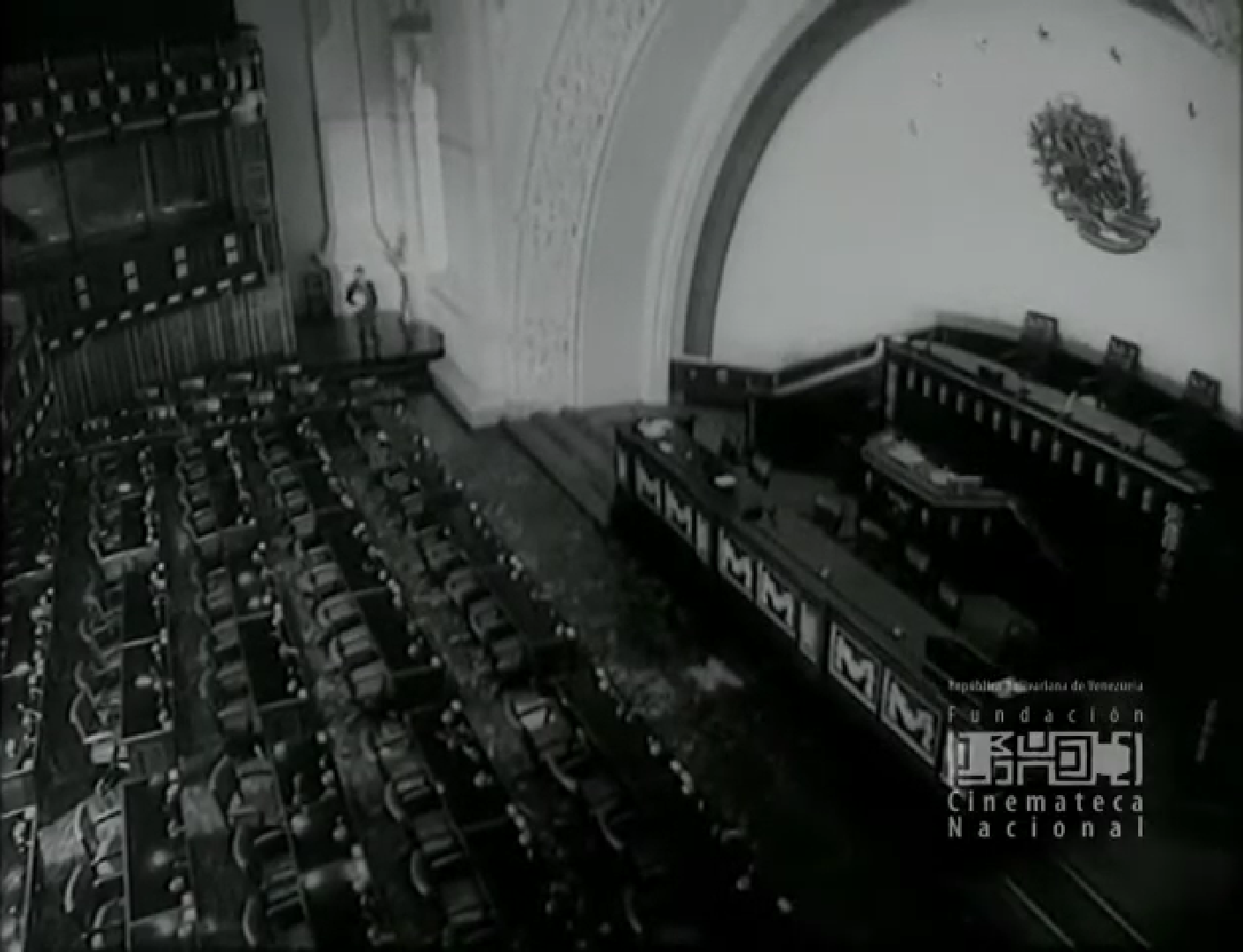
National Assembly of Venezuela

Graphical representation of the left–right spread of members in the 2009 European Parliament

== See also ==
- Debate chamber
- Parliament diagram
- Seat of the European Parliament in Strasbourg § Hemicycle
