= The Emily Post Institute =

Etiquette organization

The Emily Post Institute (EPI) is an organization founded in 1946 and located in Burlington, Vermont. Founded by etiquette author Emily Post and her son Ned, and remains managed by the Post family. Cousins Lizzie Post and Daniel Post Senning now lead the Institute.

The company offers etiquette advice and training to news outlets and corporations worldwide, as well as in-person and virtual seminars on dining etiquette, communication skills, and social media etiquette.
