= Emily Post =

American etiquette expert (1872–1960)

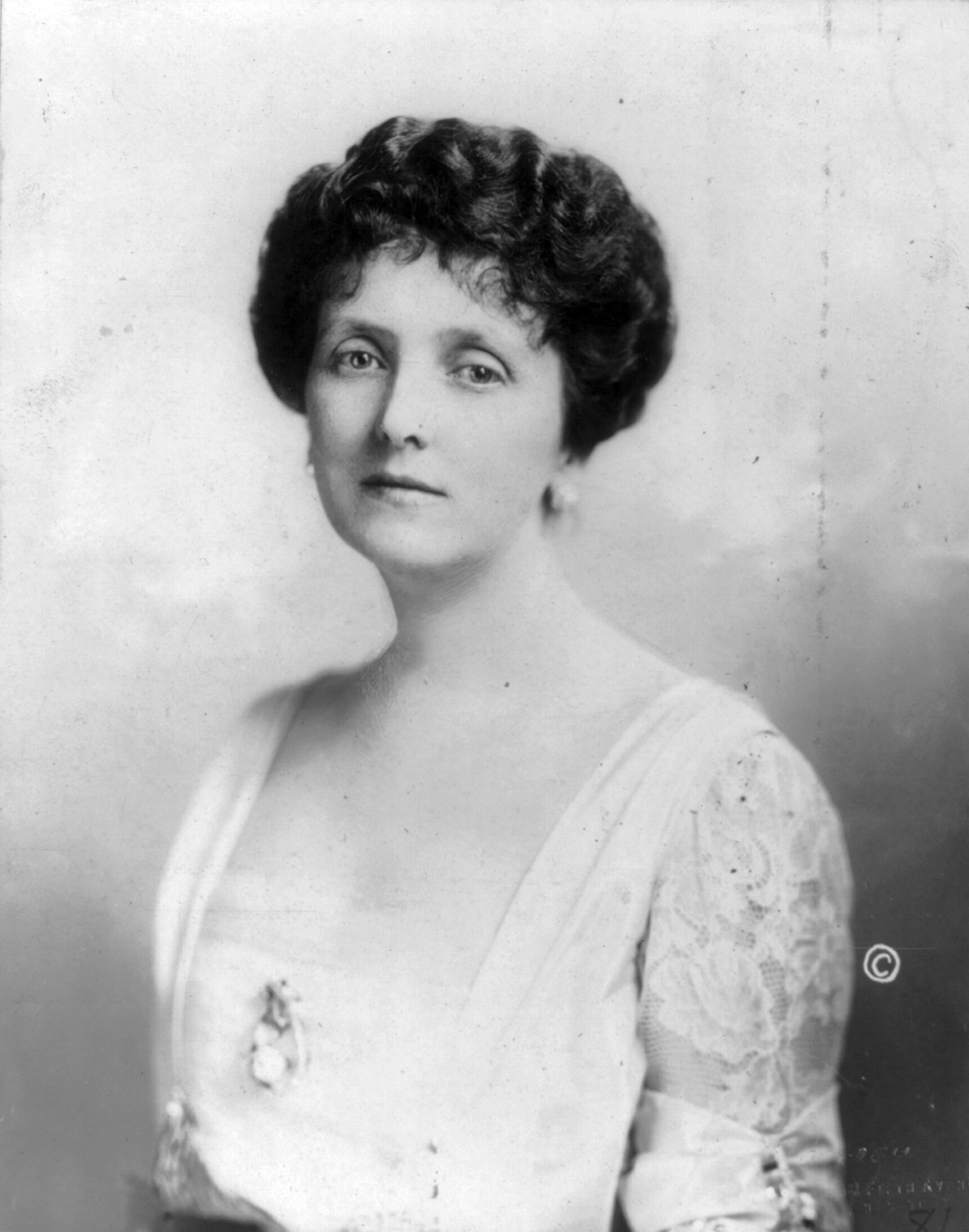
- Post in 1912
- Born: Emily Price c. October 27, 1872; Baltimore, Maryland, U.S.
- Died: September 25, 1960 (aged 87); New York City, U.S.
- Occupations: Author, Founder of The Emily Post Institute
- Spouse: Edwin Main Post (m. 1892; div. 1905)
- Children: 2
- Parents: Bruce Price; Josephine Lee
- Relatives: Elizabeth Post (granddaughter-in-law); Peggy Post (great-granddaughter-in-law)
- Writing career
- Subject: Etiquette

Emily Post (née Price; c. October 27, 1872 – September 25, 1960) was an American author, novelist, and socialite who wrote about etiquette.

== Early life and education ==
Post was born Emily Bruce Price in Baltimore, Maryland, possibly in October 1872. The precise date is unknown. (Note: Primary documents conflict with the birthdate that she usually gave: October 27, 1872. The burial records of her brother, William Lee Price, who died in infancy, give his dates as April 18, 1873 to December 6, 1875, but he could not have been born five months and 21 days after his sister. That she was born six months after he was is equally unlikely. Therefore, something is awry and is unresolvable from primary records. It is less likely for a contemporary burial record of a two-year-old to have gotten his birth year wrong than for an adult to have used an erroneous birth date.) Her father was the architect Bruce Price, famed for designing luxury communities. Her mother Josephine (Lee) Price of Wilkes-Barre, Pennsylvania was the daughter of Washington Lee, a wealthy coal baron and owner of a Pennsylvania mine. After being educated at home in her early years, Price attended Miss Graham's finishing school in New York after her family moved there.

The New York Times' Dinitia Smith reports, in her review of Laura Claridge's 2008 biography of Post,

Emily was tall, pretty and spoiled. [...] She grew up in a world of grand estates, her life governed by carefully delineated rituals like the cotillion with its complex forms and its dances—the Fan, the Ladies Mocked, Mother Goose—called out in dizzying turns by the dance master.

Price met her future husband, Edwin Main Post, a prominent banker, at a ball in a Fifth Avenue mansion. Following their wedding in 1892 and a honeymoon tour of Europe, they lived in New York's Washington Square. They also had a country cottage, named "Emily Post Cottage", in Tuxedo Park, which was one of four Bruce Price Cottages she inherited from her father. The couple moved to Staten Island and had two sons, Edwin Main Post Jr. (1893) and Bruce Price Post (1895).

Emily and Edwin divorced in 1905 because of his affairs with chorus girls and fledgling actresses, which made him the target of blackmail.

== Career ==
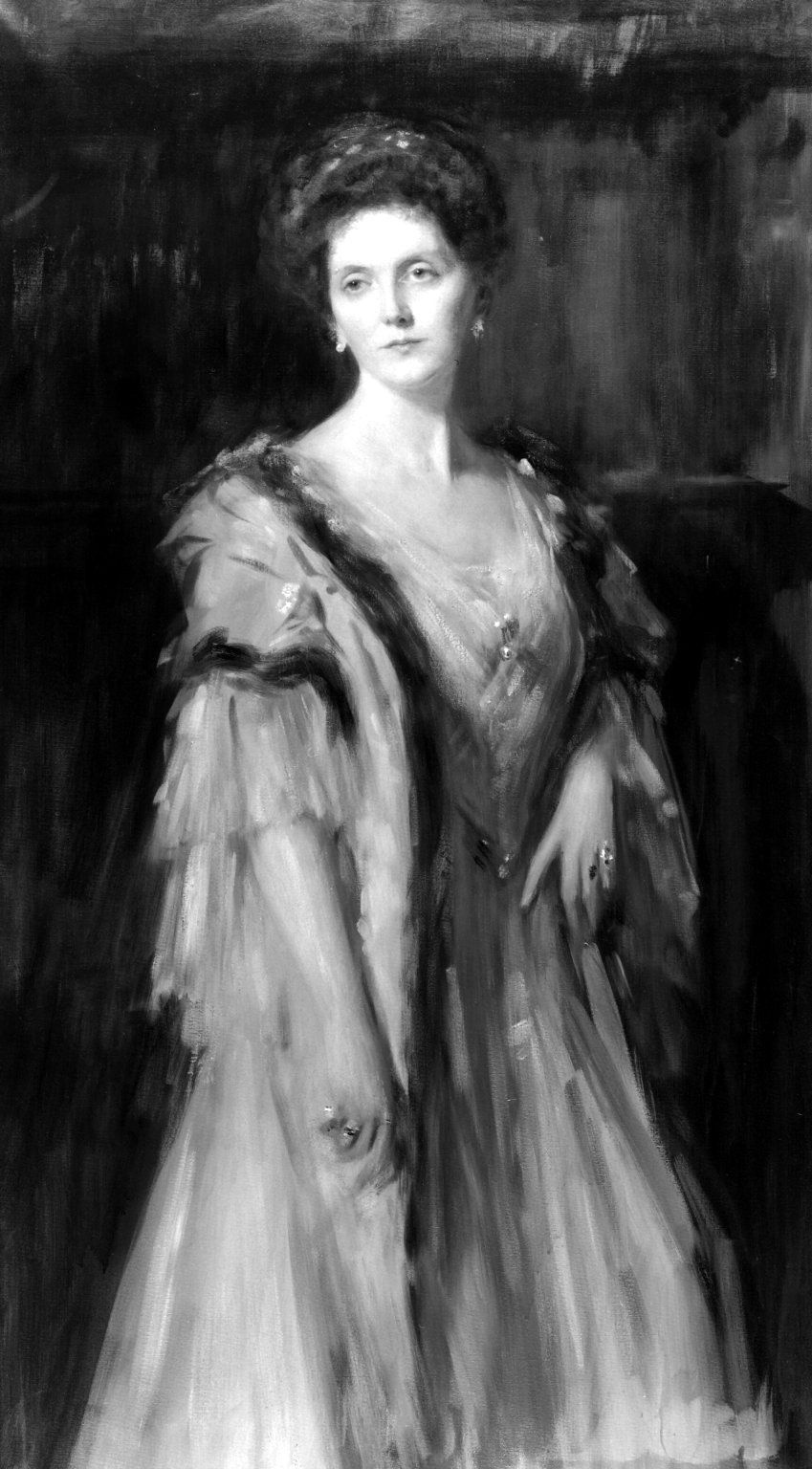
Portrait of Post by Emil Fuchs, now housed in the Brooklyn Museum

Post began to write once her two sons were old enough to attend boarding school. Her early work included humorous travel books, newspaper articles on architecture and interior design, and magazine serials for Harper's, Scribner's, and The Century. She wrote five novels: Flight of a Moth (1904), Purple and Fine Linen (1905), Woven in the Tapestry (1908), The Title Market (1909), and The Eagle's Feather (1910). In 1916, she published By Motor to the Golden Gate—a recount of a road trip she made from New York to San Francisco on the Lincoln Highway with her son Edwin and another companion.

Post wrote her first etiquette book Etiquette in Society, in Business, in Politics, and at Home (1922, frequently referenced as Etiquette) when she was 50. It became a best-seller with numerous editions over the following decades. After 1931, Post spoke on radio programs and wrote a column on good taste for the Bell Syndicate. The column appeared daily in over 200 newspapers after 1932.

In her review of Claridge's 2008 biography of Post, The New York Times' Dinitia Smith explains the keys to Post's popularity:

Such books had always been popular in America: the country's exotic mix of immigrants and newly rich were eager to fit in with the establishment. Men had to be taught not to blow their noses into their hands or to spit tobacco onto ladies' backs. Arthur M. Schlesinger, who wrote Learning How to Behave: A Historical Study of American Etiquette Books in 1946, said that etiquette books were part of "the leveling-up process of democracy," an attempt to resolve the conflict between the democratic ideal and the reality of class. But Post's etiquette books went far beyond those of her predecessors. They read like short-story collections with recurring characters: the Toploftys, the Eminents, the Richan Vulgars, the Gildings, and the Kindharts.

In 1946, Post founded The Emily Post Institute, which continues her work.

== Death ==
Post died in her New York City apartment in 1960 at the age of 87. She is buried in the cemetery at St. Mary's-in-Tuxedo Episcopal Church in Tuxedo Park, New York.

== Cultural legacy ==
A portrait of Emily Post by Emil Fuchs (c. 1906) is in the collection of the Brooklyn Museum.

Frank Tashlin featured Post's caricature emerging from her etiquette book and scolding England's King Henry VIII about his lack of manners in the cartoon Have You Got Any Castles? (1938).

Pageant in 1950 named her the second most powerful woman in America, after Eleanor Roosevelt.

On May 28, 1998, the United States Postal Service issued a 32¢ stamp featuring Post as part of their Celebrate the Century stamp sheet series.

In 2008, Laura Claridge published Emily Post: Daughter of the Gilded Age, Mistress of American Manners, the first full-length biography of the author.

== Emily Post Institute ==
The Emily Post Institute, founded by Post in 1946, continues to operate as a family-run organization now in its fifth generation. The institute promotes etiquette principles centered on consideration, respect, and honesty, and produces books, educational programs, online resources, and media content addressing modern social and professional conduct. Its work reflects the ongoing adaptation of Post’s original ideas to contemporary cultural norms

== See also ==
- Adolph Freiherr Knigge
- Amy Vanderbilt
- Book of the Civilized Man
- Brad Templeton—who posted Emily Postnews Answers Your Questions on netiquette on Usenet
- Letitia Baldrige
- Miss Manners
- Miss Porter's School
- Lillian Eichler Watson—Post's primary competitor from the 1920s through the 1950s
