= Baito keigo =

Form of Japanese honorifics

Baito keigo (Japanese: バイト敬語), is a controversial form of honorifics (keigo) in the Japanese language taught via employee training manuals, especially to young part-timers (バイト) at fast-food restaurants and convenience stores. Baito keigo incorporates nonstandard formulas for servers and cashiers to use when addressing customers, commonly longer and vaguer than the standard expression in an attempt to increase the level of politeness and avoid offense. Baito keigo is opposed by language purists on the grounds that their use frequently leads to grammatically incorrect or illogical constructions.

Alternate terms include "manual keigo," "convenience-store keigo," and "family-restaurant keigo."

== Forms ==
=== False choices: X no hō wa/ga ===
The use of X no hō wa originally refers to direction. In a contrasting sentence it is used to express preference to one thing instead of another. (Example: X yori Y no hō ga suki da. ("More than X, [I] like Y.") In baito keigo, X no hō wa/ga is used to refer to the way to a seat (which is technically correct usage because it refers to the seat's direction) and also to refer to the customer's choice between several options, e.g., gamushiroppu no hō ga ikaga desu ka? ("as for [the choice of] gum syrup, how about [it]?"). The latter usage is disputed because there is only one suggestion and no choice between different options being made: instead of X no hō wa/ga, the particle wa in X wa suffices for the meaning of "as for X."

=== States of matter: N ni narimasu ===
The use of N ni narimasu (N is a noun phrase) to mean desu is manual keigo. For example, in a restaurant, a server brings the customer's food and says ebi doria ni narimasu. Here, the meaning is simply ebi doria desu ("[this] is shrimp doria"). The construction ni narimasu as a substitute for desu is grammatically incorrect Japanese, appearing to the hearer similar to the English phrasing "This'll be the shrimp doria". In modern Japanese narimasu is a polite construction for the verb naru, meaning "to become," but nothing in X ni narimasu is transforming or becoming something else. The standard keigo expression is "ebi doria de gozaimasu." While the phrase "X ni natte imasu" (and its humble equivalent, "X to natte orimasu") does carry the meaning of "X desu", it implies a state of being rather than a physical object, as in, "Tōten wa zenmen kin'en to natte orimasu" ("This restaurant is completely smoke-free").

=== At the cash register ===
==== O-azukari shimasu ====
Cashiers frequently accept a sum of money from a customer and acknowledge receipt by saying, for example, ichi man en o-azukari shimasu; this phrasing is pervasive. The verb azukaru, literally "[I] temporarily take into custody", implies that the recipient will return the thing they received — it is used when accepting checked luggage, for instance — but cashiers do not return the total sum to customers. The traditionally prescribed form is "ichi man en o chōdai (ita)shimasu," as chōdai (ita)shimasu is the standard, humble expression for accepting money. Ichi man en o itadakimasu ("[I] humbly accept 10,000 yen") is also used.

==== X kara ====
In addition to the above use of o-azukari shimasu, cashiers may also use kara ("from"), as in ichi man en kara oazukari shimasu. Prescriptivists argue that this is syntactically unacceptable, with the literal meaning "[I] temporarily take into custody from 10,000 yen", i.e., that the 10,000 yen itself has handed something over to the cashier.

=== Compound greetings: Irasshaimase konnichi wa ===
The double greeting is a form of manual keigo, as is the evening pattern irasshaimase konban wa. Some describe it as sounding like "welcome good afternoon" or "welcome good evening." Irasshaimase by itself is the traditionally prescribed greeting.

=== Non-traditional use of honorifics ===
==== Otsugi no okyaku-sama ====
"[The] honorable next honorable customer" is also nonstandard keigo. Purists maintain non-polite words can not be indiscriminately made polite by merely adding o or go (both prefixes meaning "honorable.") Although okyaku-sama (literally "Mr. Honorable Customer") is an accepted form of address of respect to a customer, adding o to tsugi ("next") is baito keigo.

A similar proscribed usage is "[name of food ordered] + no okyaku-sama" (example: ebi doria no okyaku-sama ("shrimp doria customer")), which is disputed on the grounds that since it does not unambiguously mean "the customer who ordered X" it can be interpreted as literally meaning "the customer who is X".

==== Gochūmon wa osoroi deshō ka ====
It is common for serving staff to use this phrasing. While gochūmon is acceptable with an honorific (as it refers to the order as belonging to the customer, who is the intended recipient of the honorific speech), prescriptivists argue that osoroi is incorrect because chūmon is the subject of the verb, and raising up the status of the order itself is not the intent: the literal interpretation would be "Are your [hon.] orders all honoring us with their presence?" The traditionally prescribed phrasing is, "Gochūmon wa soroimashita deshō ka" ("Are your [hon.] orders all assembled?", i.e. "Have you decided what to order?")

=== Complex and confused humble speech: Sasete itadakimasu ===
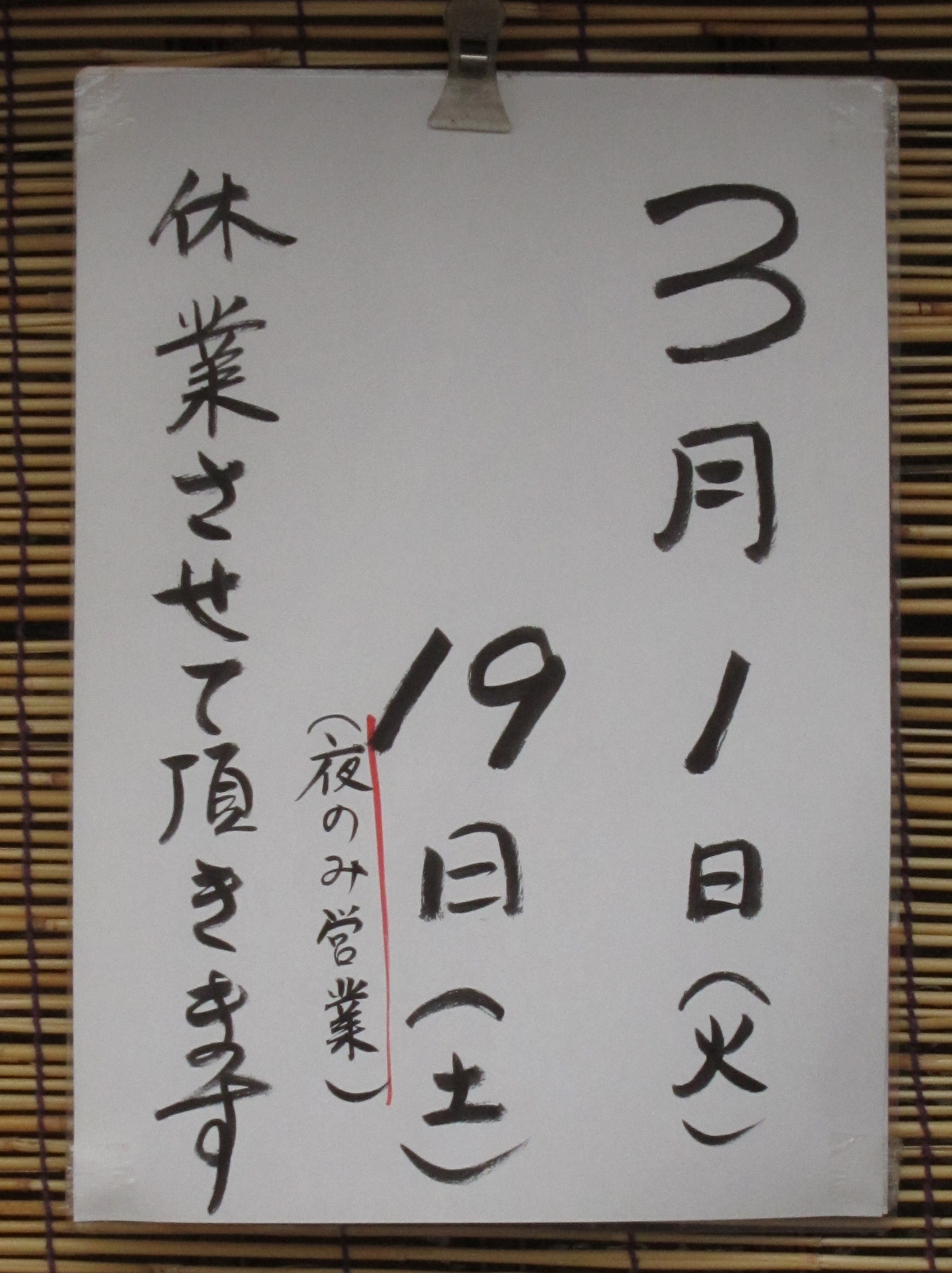
Store sign showing usage of manual keigo – tr. "You kindly allow [us] to be closed" or "[We humbly] have [you] allow [us] to be closed," a kind of manual keigo that attributes agency to customers with no say in the matter

This form is created by conjugating verbs with saseru (the causative form of the verb suru, "to do", thus "to force/to allow/let"), + itadaku (the humble form of morau, "to accept", here used in the sense of "have [person] do [action]"). It is called sasete itadakimasu because suru ("to do") is often attached to nouns which can function as verbs with suru. For example, a store will place a sign outside stating honjitsu (wa) kyūgyō sasete itadakimasu. (Today, we [humbly] have you allow our store to be closed.) However, this terminology applies to all verbs conjugated in such a manner. The appropriateness of sasete itadakimasu ("we [humbly] have you allow us to...") is disputed; as a form of object-focused humble language, it implies that the recipient of the action itself is giving permission to do it, but manual keigo users will also apply it to situations where the listener has no such agency (as in the store-closure example above). Such situations should instead use hearer-focused humble language (teichōgo or "courtesy language"), such as the verb itashimasu in place of plain suru or polite shimasu (in the store example, it is properly 休業いたします, "We [humbly] will be closed").

Even in contexts where the sasete itadakimasu construction technically makes sense, it can cause pitfalls, as baito keigo users tend to use it indiscriminately to refer to both what they will do and what they want the customer to do (inadvertently replacing the forms shite itadakimasu ["we (humbly) have you do for us"] and shite kudasaimasu ["you (hon.) do for us"] for the latter), creating confusion about who is going to do what. Nevertheless, sasete itadakimasu is quickly replacing the simpler, traditional humble form itashimasu.

== See also ==
- Aizuchi
