= Customs and etiquette in Japanese dining =

Etiquette and practices in Japan

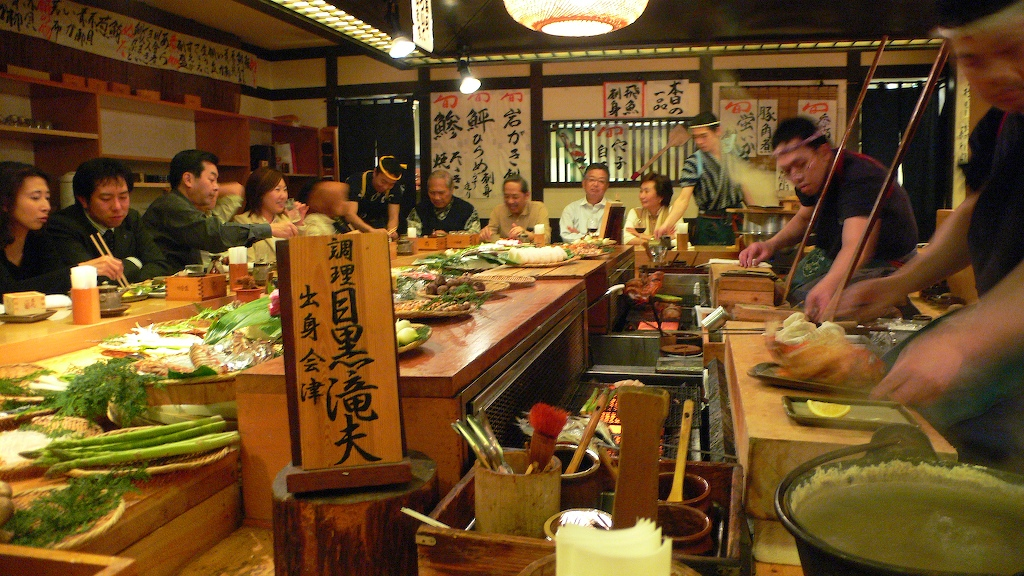
Diners at a restaurant in Tokyo

Japanese dining etiquette is a set of traditional perceptions governing specific expectations which outlines general standards of how one should behave and respond in various dining situations.

== Overview ==
In Japan, it is customary to say itadakimasu (頂きます/戴きます/いただきます); literally "I humbly receive") before starting to eat a meal. Similar to the French phrase bon appétit or the act of saying grace, itadakimasu serves as an expression of gratitude for all who played a role in providing the food, including farmers, as well as the living organisms that gave their life to become part of the meal. Saying itadakimasu before a meal has been described as both a secular and a religious practice.

When saying itadakimasu, both hands are put together in front of the chest or on the lap. The Japanese attach as much importance to the aesthetic arrangement of the food as its actual taste. Before touching the food, it is polite to compliment the chef. It is also a polite custom to wait for the eldest or highest ranking guest at the table to start eating before the other diners start. Another customary and important etiquette is to say gochisōsama-deshita (ご馳走様でした(ごちそうさまでした); lit. "it was a feast") (ja) to the host after the meal and the restaurant staff when leaving.

Not finishing one's meal is not considered impolite in Japan, but rather is taken as a signal to the host that one wishes to be served another helping. Conversely, finishing one's meal completely, especially the rice, indicates that one is satisfied and therefore does not wish to be served any more. Children are especially encouraged to eat every last grain of rice. (See also mottainai as Buddhist philosophy.) It is impolite to pick out certain ingredients and leave the rest. One should chew with the mouth closed.

It is acceptable to lift soup and rice bowls to the mouth so one does not spill food. Miso soup is drunk directly from its (small) bowl; larger soups and those with chunky ingredients may come with a spoon. Hashi ("chopsticks") are always provided. Noodles from hot soup are often blown on (once lifted from the soup) to cool them before eating; and it is appropriate to slurp certain foods, especially ramen or soba noodles. However, slurping is not practiced universally, and Western-style noodles (pasta) should not be slurped.

Rice is generally eaten plain or sometimes with nori (very thin sheets of dried seaweed, perhaps shredded or cut into strips) or furikake (a seasoning). More substantial additives may also be provided: a raw egg, nattō (sticky fermented soy beans), a small piece of cooked fish, or tsukemono (preserved vegetables). The egg and nattō are often served at breakfast; both are meant to be mixed into the rice. Less commonly, dishes feature rice with ingredients mixed in, either during the cooking (takikomi gohan, "cooked in rice") or after the rice has been cooked (maze gohan, 混ぜご飯, "mixed rice").

Pouring soy sauce over white rice is not a Japanese custom, nor is it good form to pour soy sauce directly over sashimi or sushi. Soy sauce is a condiment to be used with discretion, just enough to enhance, but not overwhelm the flavor of the food to which it is added. At each diner's seat, a small dish is provided for holding the sauce and dipping in a bit of food. To pour an excessive amount of soy sauce into this dish is considered greedy and wasteful (see mottainai). Put in a little, and add more as needed.

Sushi etiquette dictates that when eating nigiri-zushi, one dips the topping-side of the sushi piece into the soy sauce, thus protecting the rice from soaking up too much sauce. Leaving stray grains of rice floating in the sauce is considered uncouth, but can be hard to avoid for those who have difficulty manipulating chopsticks. It is also uncouth to mix wasabi (green horseradish) into the soy sauce dish. Instead, put a dab of wasabi on the sushi piece after it has been dipped. In sushi-only restaurants, it is perfectly acceptable to use fingers instead of chopsticks to eat the nigiri-zushi.

It is uncommon for Japanese people to eat or drink while walking in public because it can be seen as inconsiderate to others. Eating while walking may imply that you think you are too busy or important to sit down and eat, and it can cause a mess if any food is dropped. Drink vending machines in Japan generally have a recycling bin for used bottles and cans, so one can consume the drink there; and in summer months one may see groups drinking near a vending machine. Some consider it rude to eat in public, but this is not a universally held aversion.

Many Japanese restaurants provide diners with single-use wooden/bamboo chopsticks that must be snapped apart near their tops (which are thicker than the bottoms). As a result, the attachment area may produce small splinters. Never rub chopsticks against each other to remove splinters: this is considered extremely rude, implying that one thinks the utensils are cheap. At the beginning of the meal, use the smooth bottom ends to pick up food from serving dishes if no other utensils have been provided for that purpose. Then eat, holding food between the bottoms of the hashi. If you later want to use your hashi to take more food from serving dishes, use the top ends to do so in order to avoid "contaminating" the food on the tray. At the end of the meal, it is good manners to return single-use chopsticks part way into their original paper wrapper; this covers the soiled sticks while indicating that the package has been used.

In Japanese restaurants, customers are given a rolled hand towel called oshibori. It is considered rude to use the towel to wipe the face or neck; however, some people, usually men, do this at more informal restaurants. Nonwoven towelettes are replacing the cloth oshibori.

In any situation, an uncertain diner can observe what others are doing; and for non-Japanese people to ask how to do something properly is generally received with appreciation for the acknowledgment of cultural differences and expression of interest in learning Japanese ways.

When using toothpicks, it is good etiquette to cover one's mouth with the other hand. Blowing one's nose in public is considered rude, especially at a restaurant; cloth handkerchiefs should never be used for this purpose. Conversely, sniffling is considered acceptable, as an alternative to nose-blowing. When sneezing, it is polite to cover one's nose with a hand.

=== Tables and sitting ===
Many restaurants and homes in Japan are equipped with Western-style chairs and tables. However, traditional Japanese low tables and cushions, usually found on tatami floors, are also very common. Tatami mats, which are made of straw, can be easily damaged and are hard to clean, thus shoes or any type of footwear are always taken off when stepping on tatami floors.

When dining in a traditional tatami room, sitting upright on the floor is common. In a casual setting, men usually sit with their feet crossed and women sit with both legs to one side. Only men are supposed to sit cross-legged. The formal way of sitting for both sexes is a kneeling style known as seiza. To sit in a seiza position, one kneels on the floor with legs folded under the thighs and the buttocks resting on the heels.

When dining out in a restaurant, the customers are guided to their seats by the host. The honored or eldest guest will usually be seated at the center of the table farthest from the entrance. In the home, the most important guest is also seated farthest away from the entrance. If there is a tokonoma, or alcove, in the room, the guest is seated in front of it. The host sits next to or closest to the entrance.

=== Hot towels ===
Before eating, most dining places provide either a hot or cold towel or a plastic-wrapped wet napkin (o-shibori). This is for cleaning hands before eating (and not after). It is rude to use them to wash the face or any part of the body other than the hands, though some Japanese men use their o-shibori to wipe their faces in less formal places. Accept o-shibori with both hands when handed the towel by a server. When finished, fold or roll up the o-shibori and place it on the table. It is impolite to use o-shibori towels to wipe any spills on the table.

=== Soy sauce ===
Soy sauce (shōyu) is not usually poured over most foods at the table; a dipping dish is usually provided. Soy sauce is, however, meant to be poured directly onto tōfu and grated daikon dishes, and in the raw egg when preparing tamago kake gohan ("egg on rice").

=== Chopsticks and bowls ===
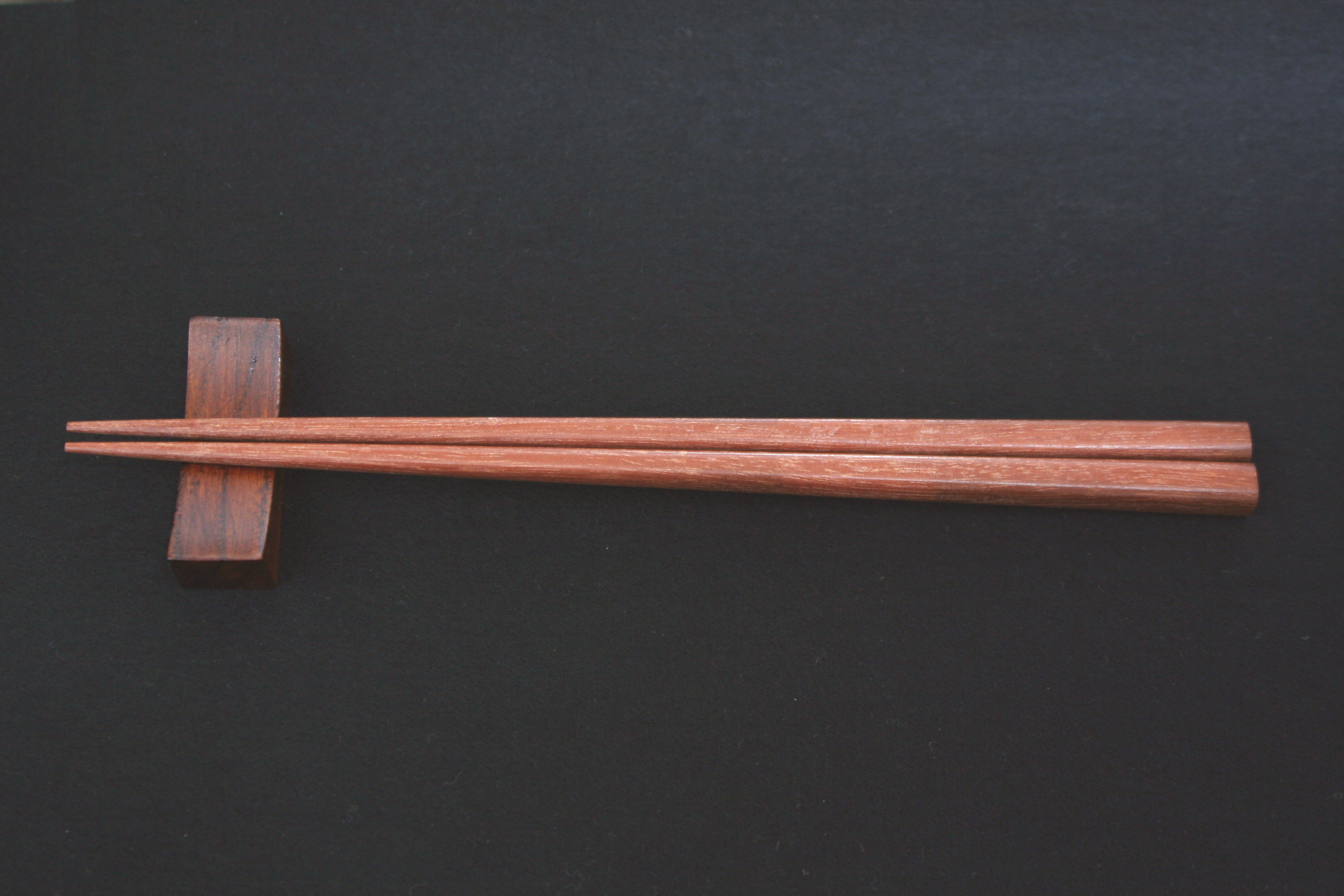
Japanese style chopsticks (お箸) are placed on a chopsticks rest (箸置き).

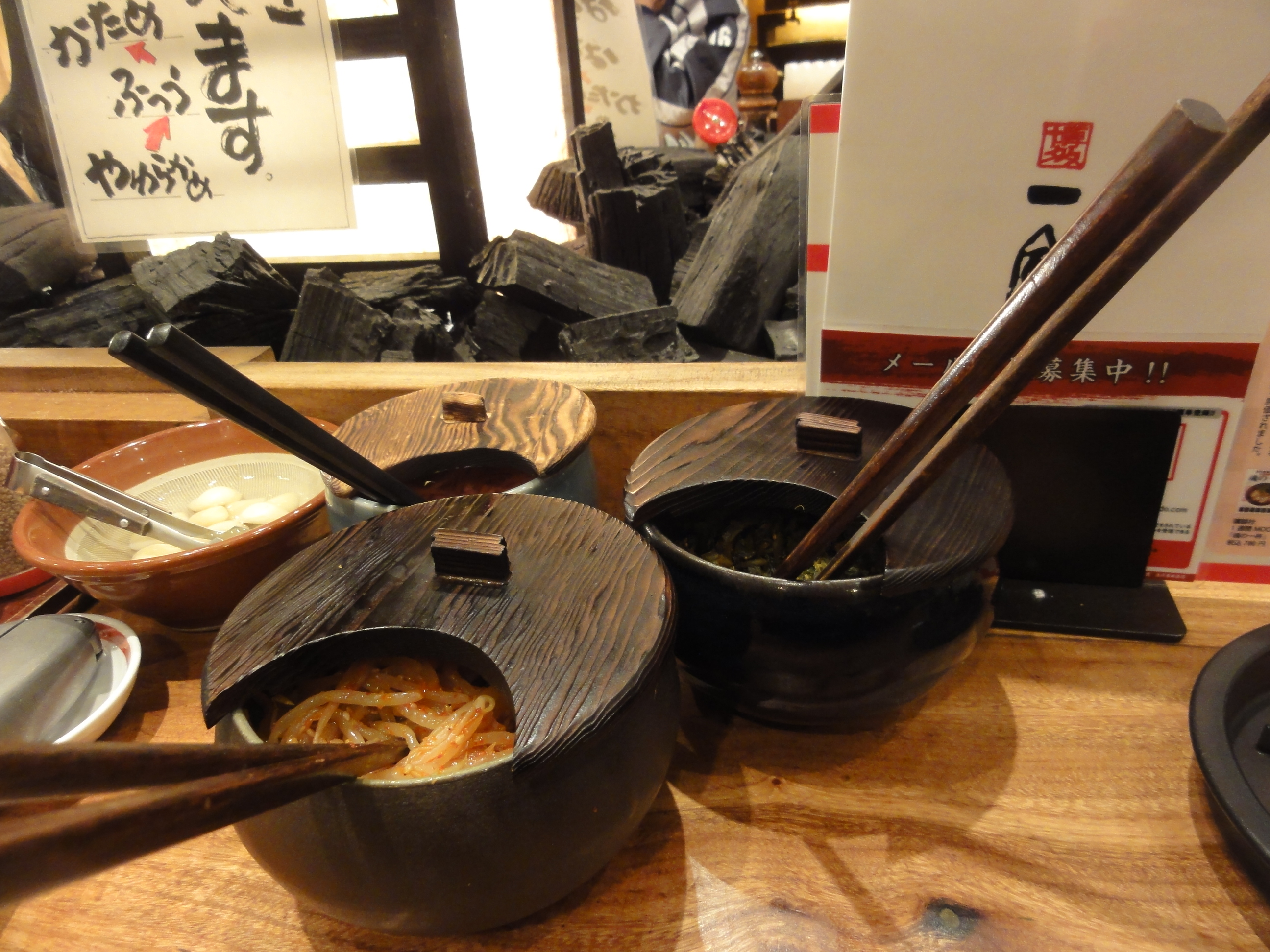
Distasteful upright placement of chopsticks

There are many traditions and perceptions surrounding the use of chopsticks (はし, hashi). Chopsticks are never left sticking vertically into rice, as this behaviour, which is called Tate-bashi (たて箸; たてばし), resembles incense sticks (which are usually placed vertically in sand during offerings to the dead). This may easily offend some Japanese people. Using chopsticks to spear food is also frowned upon and it is considered very bad manners to bite chopsticks. Other important perceptions to remember include the following:

- Hold chopsticks towards their end, and not in the middle or the front third.
- Chopsticks not in use should be laid down in front of the meal with the tip to the left. This is also the correct position in which to place chopsticks after the meal's conclusion.
- Do not pass food with chopsticks directly to somebody else's chopsticks. This technique, which is called Hiroi-bashi (拾い箸; ひろいばし), is only used at funerals, during which the bones of the cremated body of the dead person are passed from person to person in this manner. When passing food to someone else during a meal (a questionable practice in public), one should pick up the food with one's own chopsticks, reversing the chopsticks to use the end which were not in direct contact with the handler's mouth, and place it on a small plate, allowing the recipient to retrieve it (with the recipient's own chopsticks). If no other utensils are available while sharing plates of food, the ends of the chopsticks are used to retrieve the shared food. Mismatched chopsticks are not to be used.
- Do not move chopsticks around in the air too much or play with them.
- Do not move plates or bowls around with chopsticks.
- Do not hover or wave chopsticks over the dishes set on a table; this is often done by mistake when choosing which food to eat first. This behaviour, which is called Mayoi-bashi (迷い箸; まよいばし), is perceived as inappropriate, as it conveys impatience and greed in the context of Japanese dining etiquette. To avoid this, it is important to decide which food to eat first before using chopsticks to move the food onto a plate.
- To separate a piece of food into two pieces, exert controlled pressure on the chopsticks while moving them apart from each other.
- Do not place chopsticks so that they point at someone else. This is perceived as a symbolic threat.
- To make sure that any sauce or liquid attached to the food does not drip from the food or chopsticks, food which has been dipped into a soy sauce or similar kind should not be carried with chopsticks; this taboo is called Namida-bashi (涙箸; なみだばし). It is considered to be immature and unclean when the sauce or liquid from the food is dripped on the table.
- Put the chopsticks onto the table before talking and do not use the chopsticks to gesture or point during conversation.

Chopsticks, after being picked up with one hand, should be held firmly while considering three key points: the thumb is placed just how a pencil is held; ensure that the thumb is touched with the upper part of the chopstick. The lower part of the chopstick remains still and rests with the index finger. Make sure that the arm is relaxed so that it forms a gentle curve.

The traditional way to use chopsticks (hashi) is to hold them in the right hand and with the left hand, pick up the bowl so that it is close to the mouth. The bowl should not touch the mouth except when drinking soup. Eating with the chopsticks in the left hand or without picking up the bowl is traditionally perceived as improper table manners (except for larger types of dishes which are normally not supposed to be picked up). Small bowls are to be picked up because it is considered rude to catch falling food with your hand, which is known as tezara (手皿), meaning "hand plate". The Japanese customarily slurp noodle soup dishes like ramen, udon, and soba. Slurping noodles audibly is considered a compliment to the chef, and some believe that it may make the noodles more flavourful.

=== Communal dish ===
When taking food from a communal dish, unless with family or very close friends, one should turn the chopsticks around to touch the food; it is considered more sanitary. Alternatively, one could have a separate set of chopsticks for communal dishes.

=== Eat what is given ===
It is customary to eat rice to the last grain. Being a picky eater is frowned upon, and it is not customary to ask for special requests or substitutions at restaurants. It is considered ungrateful to make these requests, especially in circumstances where one is being hosted, as in a business dinner environment or a home. After eating, try to move all dishes back to the same position they were at the start of the meal. This includes replacing the lids on dishes and putting one's chopsticks on the chopstick holder or back into their paper slip. Good manners dictate that one respects the selections of the host. However, this can be set aside for a diner with allergies such as a peanut allergy, or a religious prohibition against certain foods like pork.

=== Drinking ===
Even in informal situations, drinking alcohol starts with a toast (kanpai, 乾杯) when everyone is ready. Do not start drinking until everybody is served and has finished the toast. It is not customary to pour oneself a drink; rather, people are expected to keep each other's drinks topped up. When someone moves to pour one's drink, one should hold one's glass with both hands and thank the pourer.

== Japanese dining etiquette ==
=== Basic dining etiquette ===
If a series of small foods is served, it is important to fully finish off one dish prior to moving on to the next one. However, it is not considered to be compulsory to complete the entire dishes, especially the broth from ramen or similar kinds. Before starting to eat a meal, saying itadakimasu, a polite phrase meaning "I receive this food", is a way to show gratitude towards the person that prepared the meal. This can be done in a praying motion, which is gathering both hands together, or more simply, by bowing the head. Upon finishing the meal, gratitude is expressed again by saying gochisō sama deshita, meaning "it was quite a feast". The dishes or plates should be placed back to their original position after the meal.

=== Distinctive characteristics ===
Japanese dining etiquette has distinctive characteristics in general, as follows.

- Chopsticks are used in every meal.
- When eating, plates are picked up and held at chest-level except when the size of a plate is too large to do so.
- When drinking soup, the soup is drunk up from the bowl that is held straight, as an alternative to scooping the soup with a spoon.
- Finishing what is on a plate is viewed as a polite act.
- It is prohibited to rest an elbow on a table.

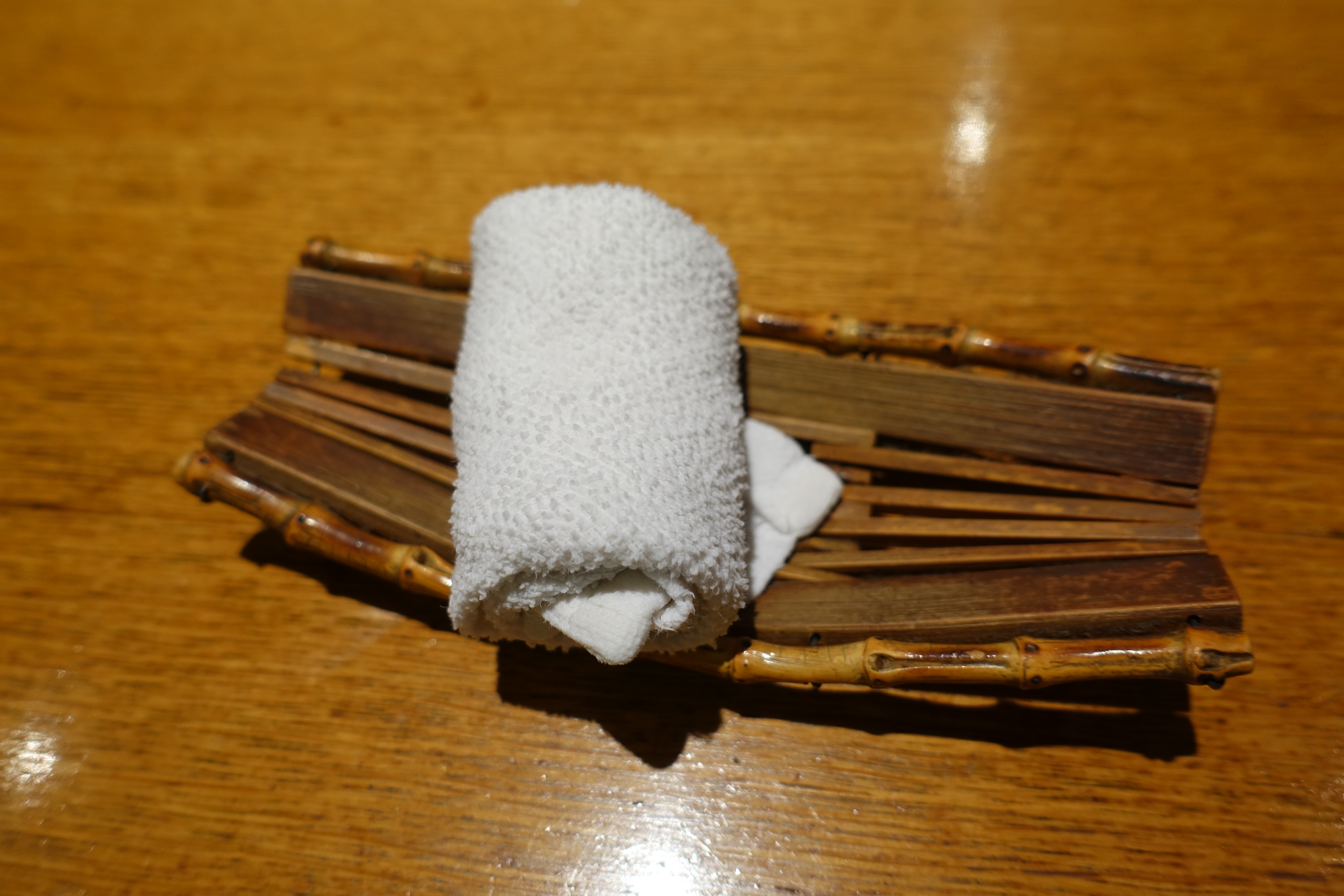
An Oshibori or hot towel is placed above a traditional Japanese plate.

=== Oshibori ===
Oshibori, also known as a wet towel, is a small white hand towel that has been soaked in clean water and wrung out to leave it damp. In Japan, it is served in most dining places folded and rolled up. Either a hot or cold towel is served depending on the season. As for dining etiquette, use the provided Oshibori to clean both hands before starting a meal. It is only used to wipe hands, and should not be used to wipe the face or for other purposes, which is considered impolite.

=== Drinking ===
When it comes to drinking alcoholic beverages in Japan, there are several points to keep in mind. The person who first pours in the glasses of others should hold the bottle with both hands simultaneously. The person who receives the pouring must hold the cup firmly, and politely ask whether or not the person who just served would like to have the gesture returned. When drinking with a group, wait until each glass is filled before drinking. To celebrate with a group, shout out the word Kanpai (literally "cheers") while raising the glass with the group simultaneously. When hosts empty their glasses, others should attempt to do the same as well.

=== Common mistakes ===
If a Japanese food contains clams, it is common to find empty clam shells placed in different bowls after one finishes the meal. However, this is regarded as impolite in Japan. The empty clam shells should be placed inside the bowl where the food was originally served. Chopsticks, if left on the table after a meal, may signal that the meal has not been finished. Therefore, it is polite to place the chopsticks sideways across the plate or bowl when the meal is finished. Talking too much when dining is not considered appropriate, and maintaining some silence while eating a meal is valued. Therefore, politeness avoids forcing unnecessary conversation when eating with someone.

== Religion ==
In the 6th and 7th century of Japan, many influences arrived in Japan through Korea, including the importation of Buddhism. In addition to the different pre-existing religions such as Confucianism and Shinto, Buddhism had become the main religion by the time of the 6th century. Today, Buddhism is the firm root of the vital dining etiquette that is universally practised in Japan.

Itadakimasu, the phrase that is used to show gratitude for those involved in making the meal (i.e., farmers, fishermen, parents, etc.), shows the traditional Japanese Buddhist foundation. The meaning of the phrase is focused on the origin of the food rather than on the coming feast. The belief from Buddhism that every object has a spirit to be recognised is implied by the phrase, manifesting both gratitude and honour to pay respect to the lives that made the food, including the cook, animals, farmers, and plants.

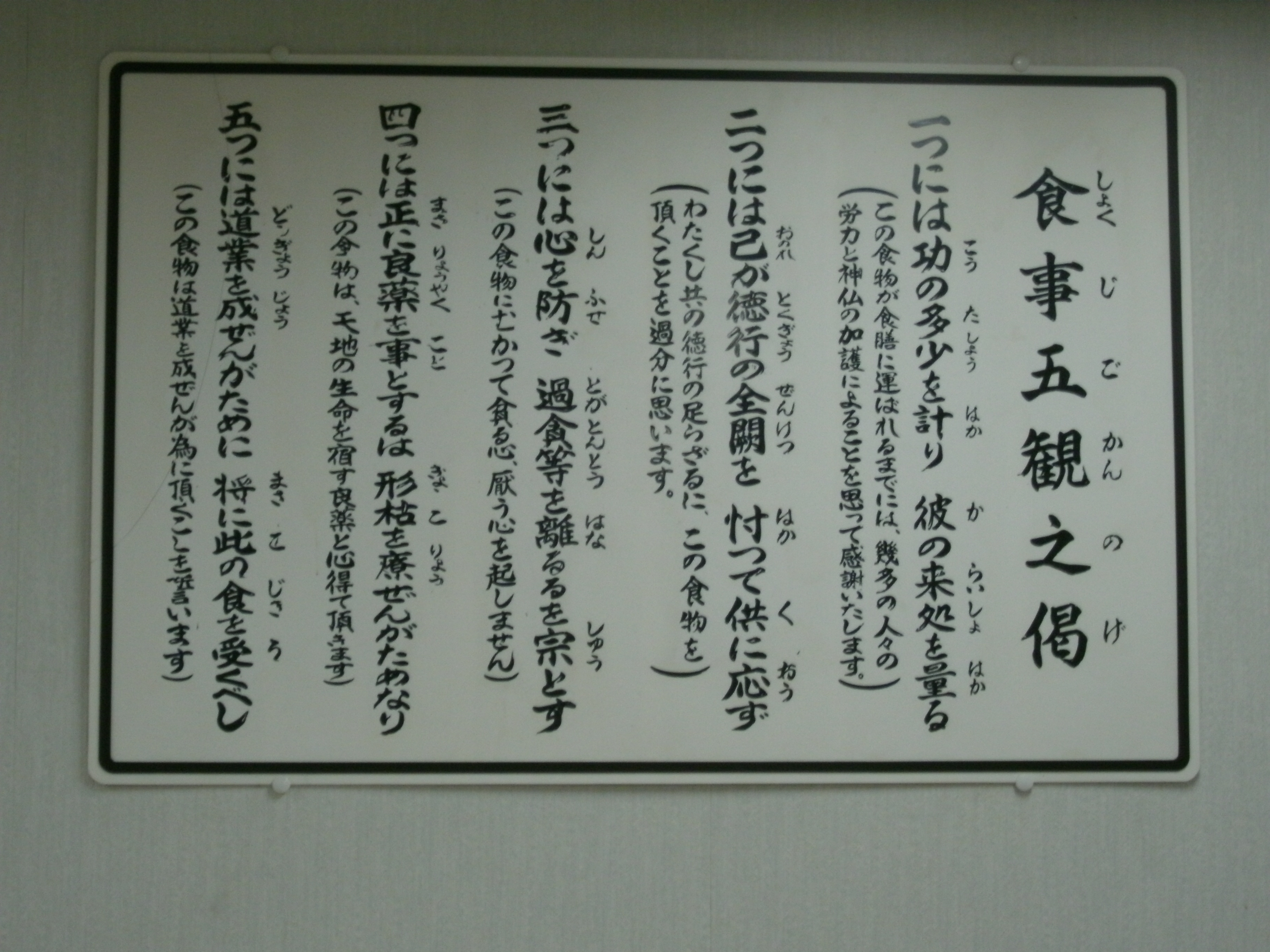
A picture showing the Five Reflections (五観の偈) displayed on a wall at Hanazono University cafeteria

However, the way of saying itadakimasu is different at Buddhist temples in Japan. Monks and nuns in a Buddhist temple are subject to saying two or more different verses before a meal, depending on the customary practices at each temple. The Five Reflections (五観の偈) or Five Remembrances is one of the verses spoken to express gratitude for the meal. The English translation of the Five Reflections (or "Gokan-no-Ge) is as follows:

1. Look through the food. Think about how nature and people's hard labour have taken part in the creation of the food.
2. Reflect upon your behaviour towards others. Consider whether your virtue and previous actions deserve the meal in front of you.
3. Contemplate whether your own spirit is truthful and purified. A mind that is full of the three greatest evils (greed, anger and ignorance) will make a disturbance when trying to genuinely appreciate or savour the food.
4. Remember that good food is better than medicine. Consuming good food is a way to rejuvenate tiredness, not a way to fulfil sensory pleasure.
5. Eat with gratitude while appreciating all beings, mindful of the Bodhisattva vows to bring others to enlightenment.

== Food and etiquette ==
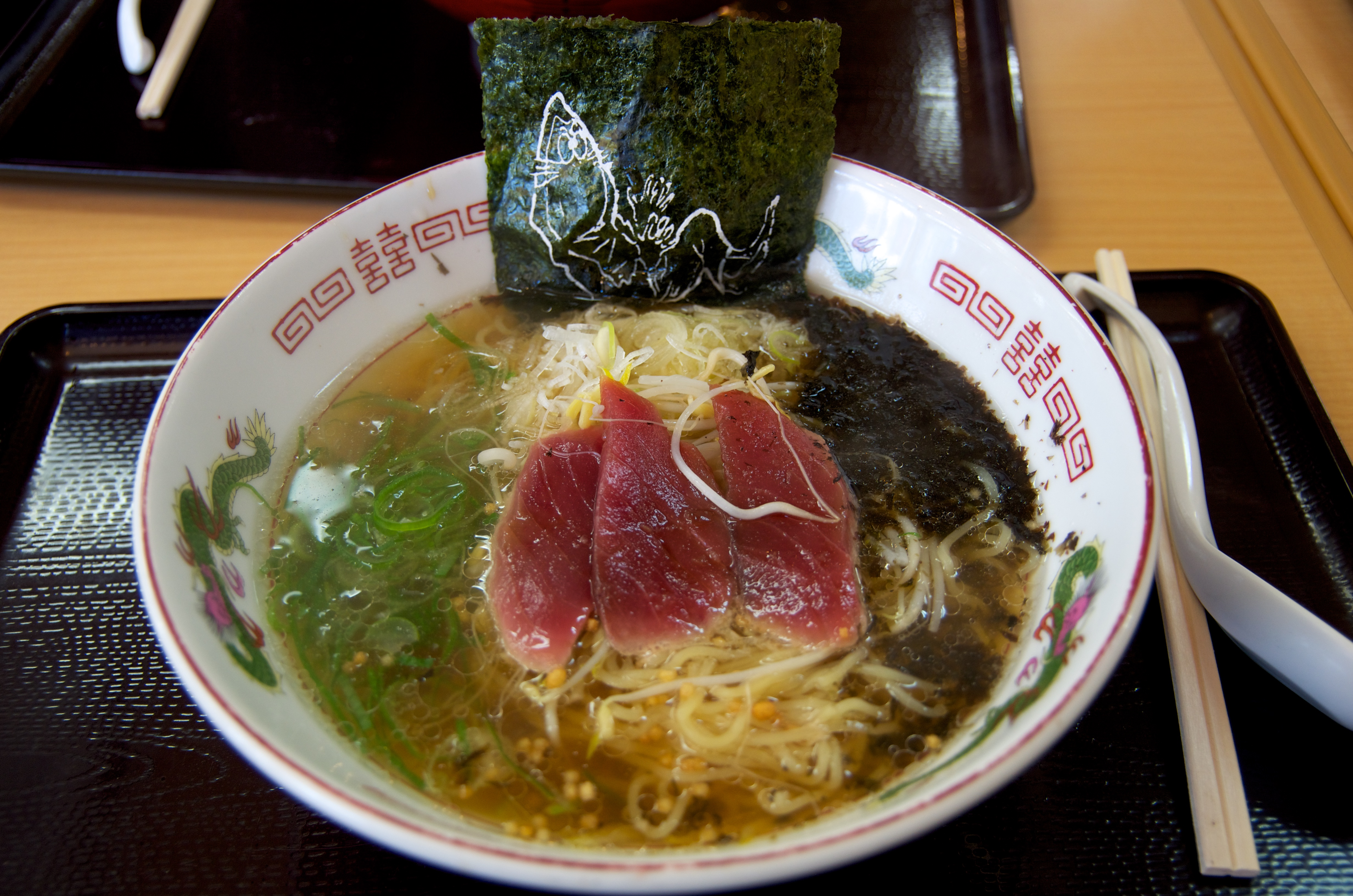
A picture of tuna ramen and chopsticks and spoon are placed next to ramen.

=== Ramen ===
When eating ramen or similar foods, it is acceptable to make slurping sounds, as it is a way of expressing appreciation for the meal and to strengthen the flavour of ramen. Noodles are cooled and hence the flavour enhanced during the slurping process. However, eating sounds of munching and burping are not very favourable, as these may displease others nearby. The noodles and toppings on ramen should be eaten with chopsticks while the soup should be drunk with a spoon.

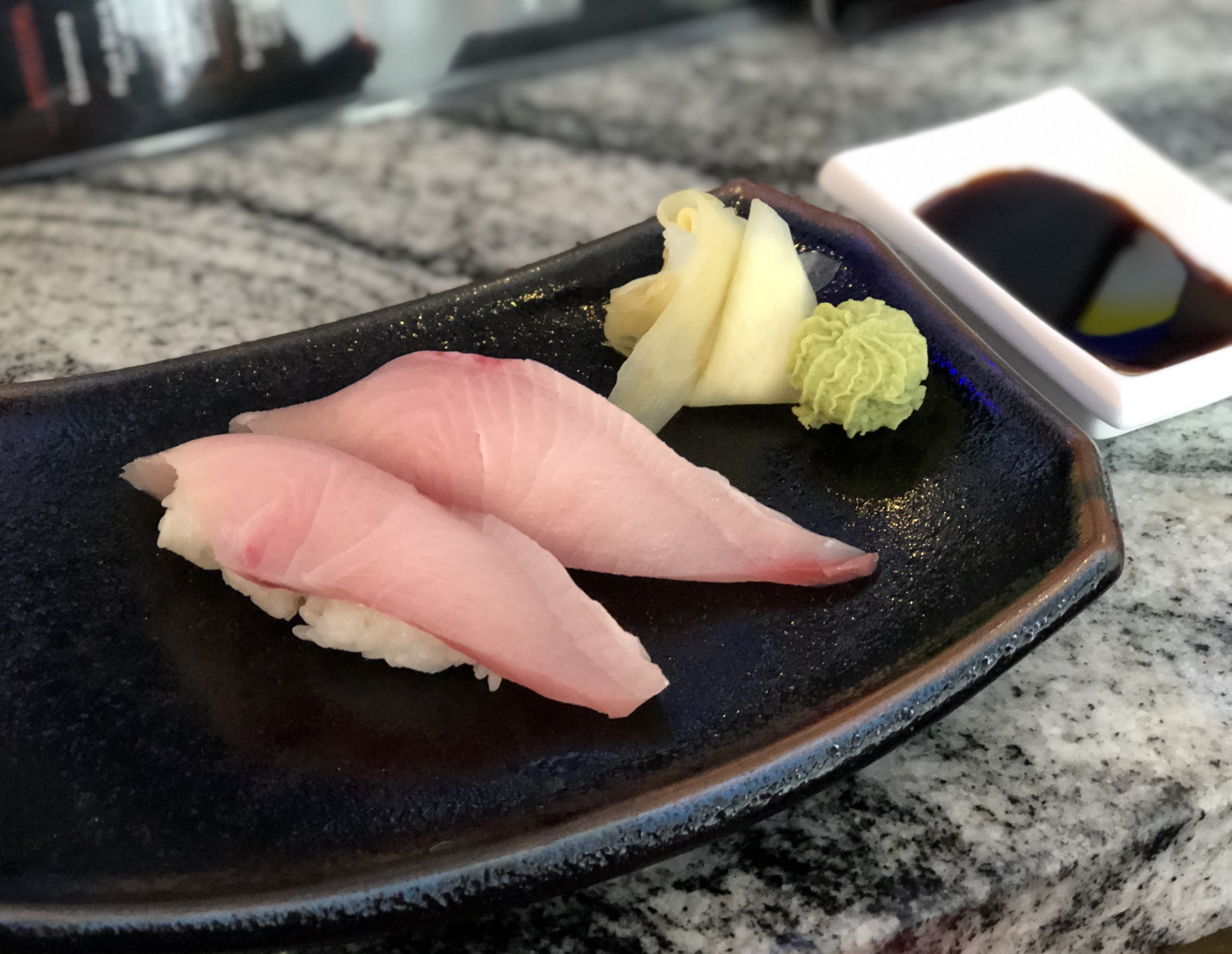
A picture of nigiri-sushi and shoyu is placed next to the sushi plate.

=== Sushi ===
Sushi is one of the most famous dishes of Japan. Sushi may be eaten with bare hands, but sashimi is eaten with chopsticks. When shoyu (literally, soy sauce) is served together with nigiri-sushi (sushi with a fish topping), pick up the sushi and dip the fish topping, not the rice, into the shoyu. Having the rice absorb shoyu too much would change the original taste of the nigiri-sushi, and trying to dip rice into the shoyu may cause the whole sushi to fall apart, dropping rice in the shoyu plate. The appearance of rice floating around on the shoyu plate is not considered a taboo in Japanese culture, but it may leave a bad impression. In case shoyu must be poured into a bowl, pour only a tiny amount; pouring a large portion is considered wasteful, which is a serious taboo in Japan.

=== Bentō ===
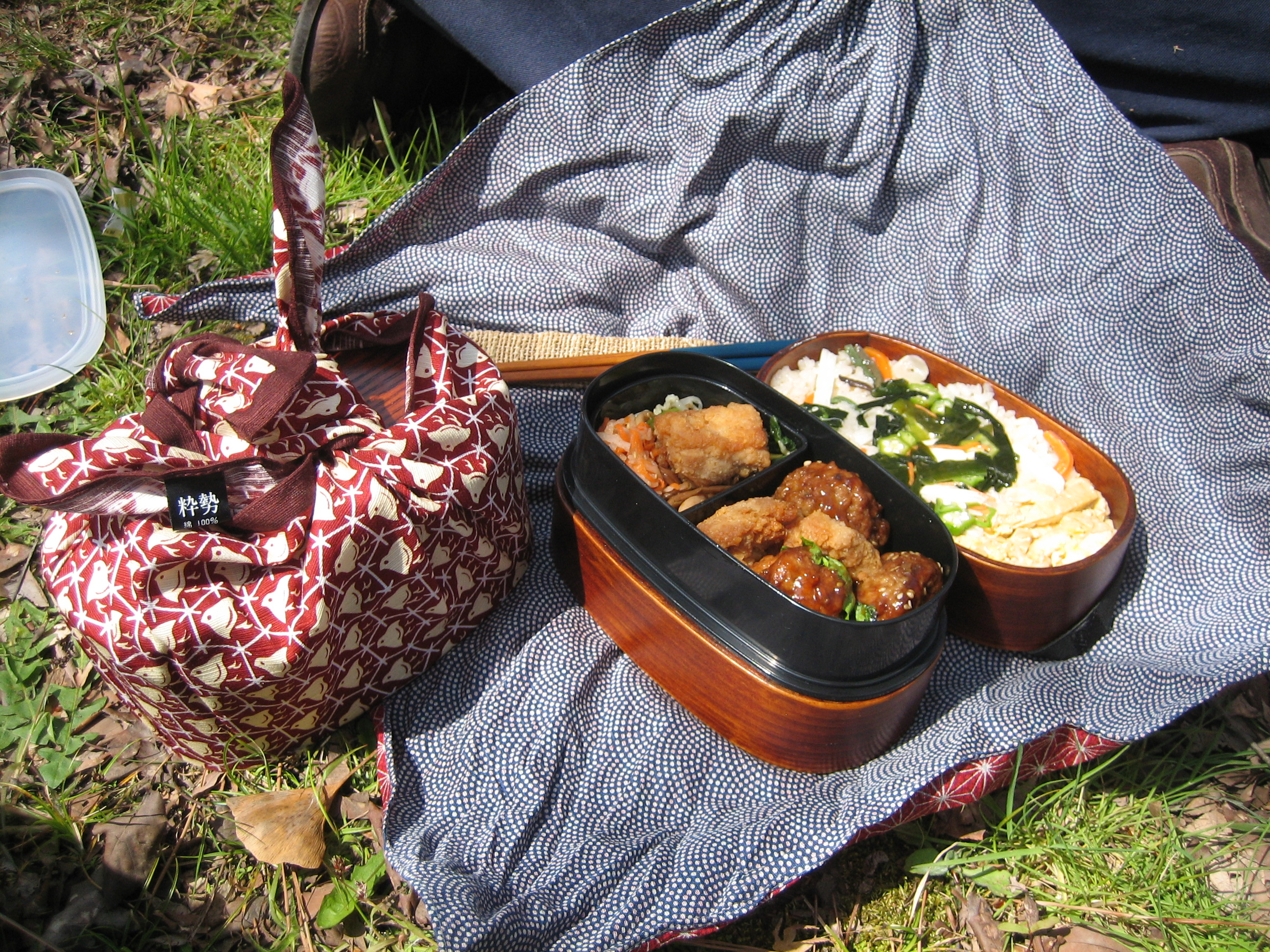
A typical home made Bentō lunch box. It usually contains rice and a variety of side dishes that go well with rice.

Bentō, boxed meals in Japan, are very common and constitute an important ritual during lunch, beginning around the time children reach nursery school. Parents take special care when preparing meals for their children, arranging the food in the order in which it will be eaten. A bentō may appear decorative, but it should be consumed in its entirety.

A bentō is judged by how well it is prepared. Parents are almost expected to "show off" in making the lunch. Though the food is prepared for their child, the results are observed by the other children and the nursery school, and this leads to a sort of competition among parents.

Because the appearance of food is important in Japan, parents must be sure to arrange the bentō in an attractive way. A parent may prepare a leaf cut-out in fall, or cut an orange into the shape of a flower if the season is summer. It is not uncommon to see seven different courses within a bentō.

Parents are also encouraged to prepare what the children will enjoy eating. If the child does not like what the parent has prepared, then they will most likely not consume it, going against the rule that "it must be consumed in its entirety".

== See also ==
- Customs and etiquette in Chinese dining
- Etiquette in Japan
- Table manners
