= Customs and etiquette in Chinese dining =

Social norms practiced during meals by culturally Chinese

Customs and etiquette in Chinese dining are the traditional behaviors observed while eating in Greater China. These practices have spread throughout East Asia to varying degrees, influencing aspects of formal dining from guest seating arrangements to chopstick usage and settling the bill.

Chinese dining customs emphasize communal eating, with dishes shared among all diners rather than ordered individually. Round tables are preferred for larger groups to facilitate sharing, often featuring Lazy Susan turntables at the center. A traditional place setting includes a small teacup, a plate with a rice bowl, chopsticks placed to the right of the plate, and a soup spoon. Seating arrangements follow a strict hierarchy based on age and social status, with the seat of honor typically facing east or the entrance, reserved for the host or eldest person. Multiple main dishes are served together rather than in individual courses, usually totaling one dish per person at the table, though celebratory events may feature ten or more dishes.

Proper etiquette remains important in Chinese culture despite historical disruptions during the Maoist era. Good manners are seen as invitations to good fortune and indicators of proper upbringing, while poor conduct brings shame. Chopstick etiquette is particularly significant: they should never be left sticking upright in food (which resembles funeral incense), used to point at people, or separated. Diners are expected to avoid "digging" through serving dishes for choice morsels, to wait for elders or honored guests to eat first, and to leave no food waste on their plates. In formal settings, toasting follows specific protocols, with guests expected to accept toasts as a sign of respect. The practice of disputing who pays the bill is common, as paying demonstrates generosity and hospitality.

== Table and place settings ==
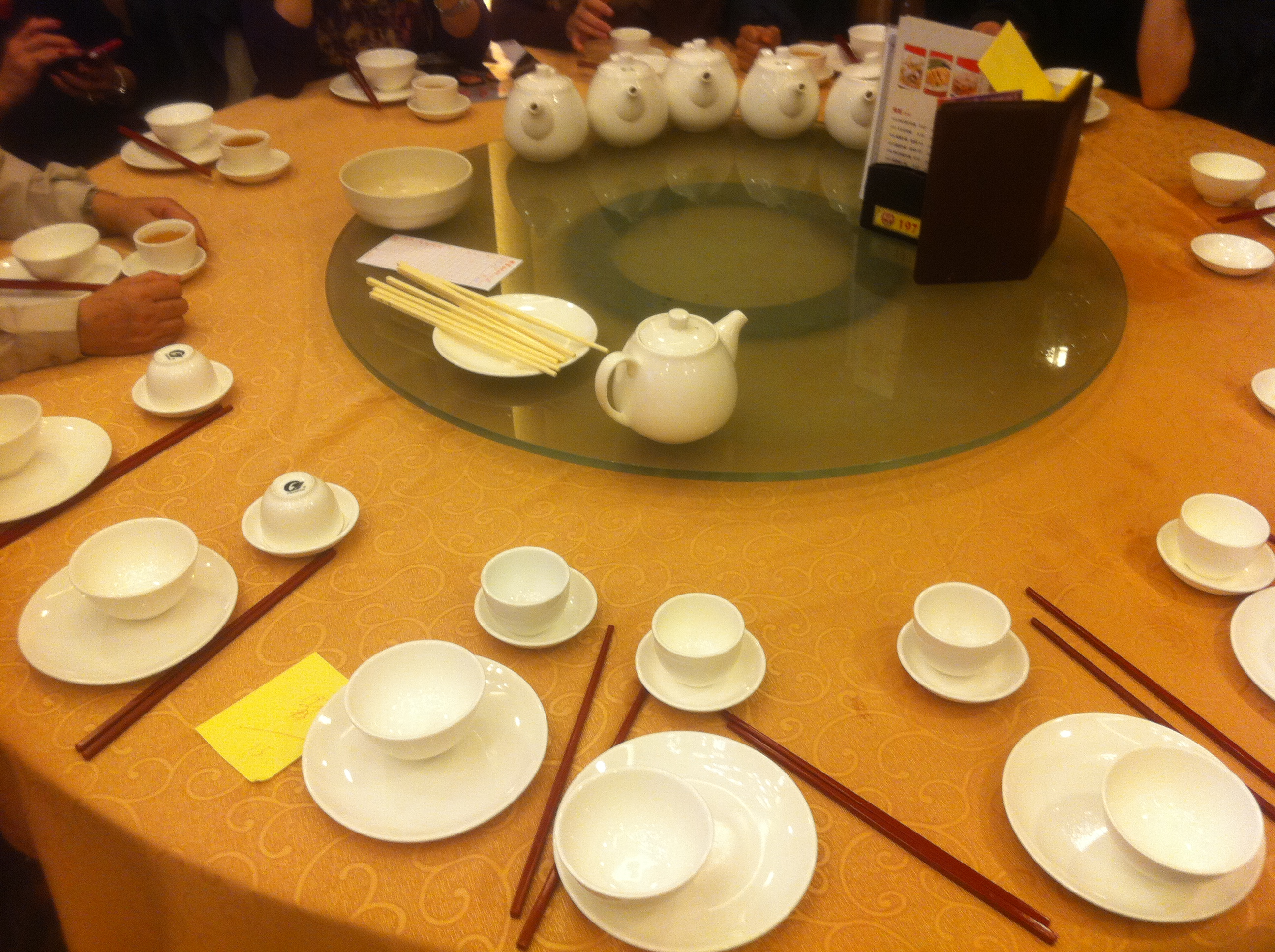
Typical place settings before a meal is served

In most traditional Chinese dining, dishes are shared communally. Although both square and rectangular tables are used for small groups of people, round tables are preferred for large groups, particularly in restaurants, in order to permit easy sharing. Lazy Susan turntables are a common feature at the center of larger tables, to facilitate passing of serving dishes.

A basic place setting consists of a small teacup; a large plate with a small, empty rice bowl; a set of chopsticks, usually on the right of the plate; and a soup spoon. Additions may include a chopstick rest or holder, a large water or wine glass, and a smaller glass for baijiu. Occasionally a small shallow dish is left for each diner, to hold a small amount of a condiment or sauce.

At homes and low-end restaurants, napkins may consist of paper tissues or occasionally must be provided by the diner. High restaurants often provide cloth napkins similar to Western dining as part of the place settings.

Unlike in some Western restaurants, ground salt, pepper, or sugar are rarely provided at the table. Sometimes bottles of soy sauce, vinegar, hot sauce, or other condiments are available. Black vinegar is popular in the north of China as a dipping sauce, particularly for dumplings.

=== Formal seating order ===
There is a specific seating order to every formal dinner, based on seniority and organizational hierarchy. The seat of honor, reserved for the host or the oldest person, is usually the position in the center facing east or facing the entrance to the room. Guests with higher status then sit in close proximity to the seat of honor, while those with lower positions sit further away. The least prestigious seat is generally the one nearest to the kitchen entrance or service door. In a formal banquet hall of many tables, the main table is the one which is located furthest from the entrance. The tables on the left hand side of the main tables are, in order of importance, second, fourth, sixth, and so on, and those on the right are third, fifth and seventh. Guests are seated according to their status and relationship with the host of the banquet.

== Sequencing of a meal ==
Wide variations exist throughout China, but the vast majority of full-course dinners are very similar in terms of timing and dishes.

=== Beverages ===
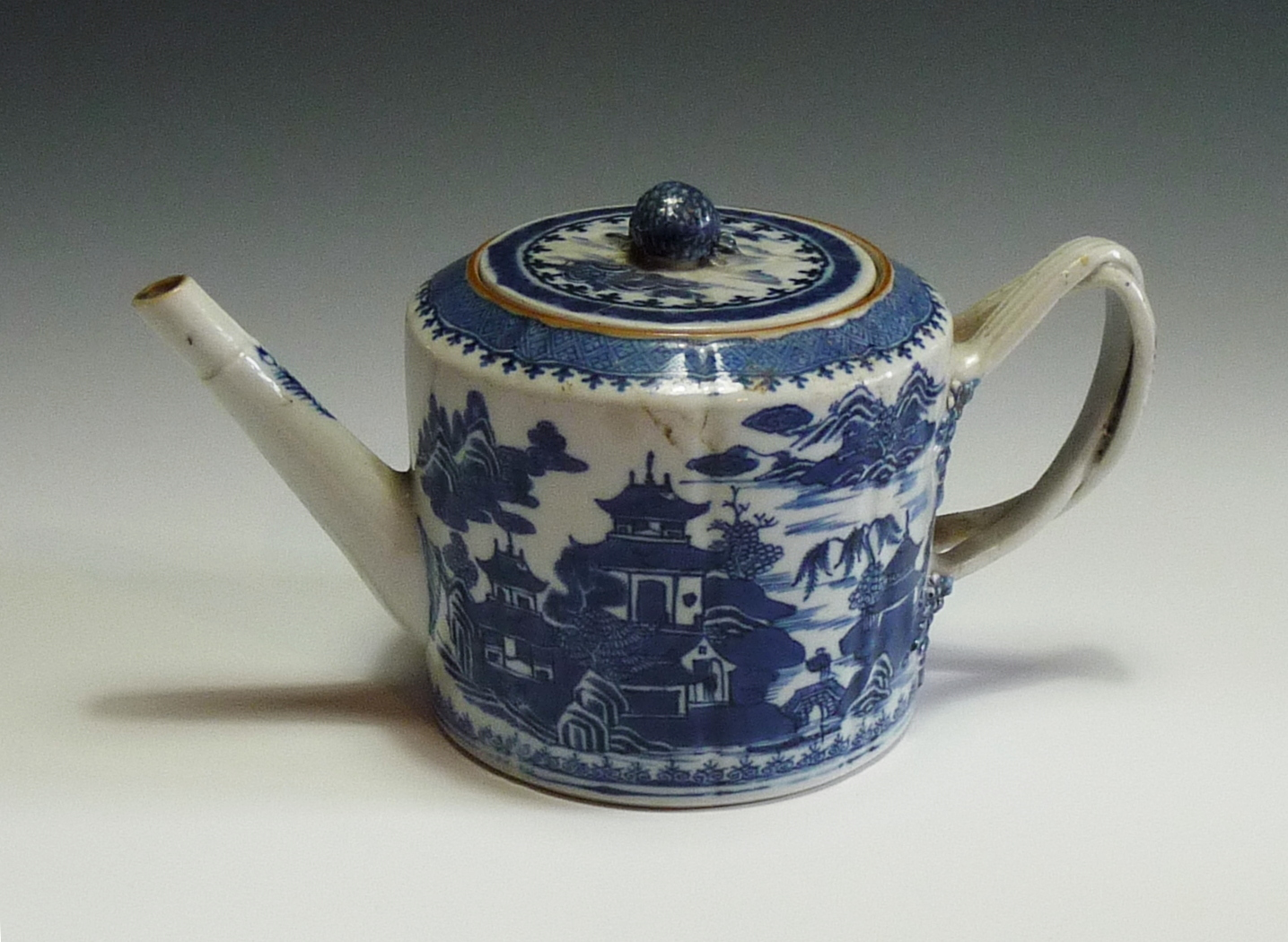
An 18th century Chinese porcelain hand painted blue and white teapot

Hot tea is almost always provided, either in advance of the diners being seated or immediately afterward. It can be consumed at leisure throughout the meal. Hot or cold water, as well as juice and other beverages, may be served as well. A verbal "thank you" (谢谢; xiexie) may be offered to the server pouring a refill or, if in the middle of a conversation where it would be rude to interrupt the speaker, the table may be tapped twice with two bent fingers instead, politely thanking the person serving and indicating that enough of the beverage has been dispensed.

Alcohol such as Baijiu is more common in northern or north-eastern part of China as well as formal events. When there is alcohol, toasting often occurs throughout the meal. Each person is expected to toast each other person at least once, and it is considered disrespectful to turn down a toast. If a server is not available, the youngest or most junior person at the table is expected to refill everyone's cup.

=== Appetizers ===
Appetizers are the first items presented. Two or more small dishes are brought to the table, holding boiled unsalted peanuts, salted roasted peanuts, crispy fried noodles, or similar dishes. These may be consumed while ordering the main courses, or while waiting for other dishes to arrive.

=== Soup ===
A hot soup may be served as one of the dishes. In some regions, this comes near the beginning of the meal while others at the end. For small meals, especially at home, it may replace the diners' beverage entirely.

=== Main courses ===
Unlike Western-style meals, there are usually multiple main dishes which are sampled by all the diners; usually, there is one communally-shared dish ordered per person seated at a table. A celebratory event such as a graduation or wedding often features over ten dishes, often an odd number for good luck. The dishes served can vary widely, and depend on the cuisine that the restaurant serves; there are eight main Chinese cuisines, and cooking styles, ingredients, and flavours all differ from region to region. The most prominent regional cuisines in China are Anhui, Cantonese, Fujian, Hunan, Jiangsu, Shandong, Sichuan, and Zhejiang.

White steamed rice is provided in small bowls and food is often placed over it, flavoring it with their sauces. The rice is consumed little by little along with the other dishes and not separately, unless the diner remains hungry after the last dish has been removed.

=== Final course ===
Near the end of the meal, a starchy, filling dish such as noodles, Chinese dumplings, or baozi is sometimes served, to ensure that guests are fully satiated. In extremely formal settings, only a small amount of this final dish is taken by the diners, to avoid implying that the host was not sufficiently generous in planning the meal.

=== Dessert ===
Informal meals may not have a dessert course at all, or offer sweet foods that are particular favorites of the diners. Fresh fruit (often slices of citrus) or fresh or canned pineapple are often offered in restaurants.

Other common desserts are tapioca or rice pudding, or a hot or cold soup flavored with sweet red beans. Ice cream may be offered, often flavored with ginger, sweet red beans, or a delicate tea.

Fortune cookies are rarely offered by authentic Chinese restaurants, even in North America where they were invented. They are considered a lightweight amusement, suitable for informal gatherings of close friends and family. Fancier restaurants may offer mints or occasionally chocolates as breath fresheners.

== Manners and customs ==
Eating is a dominant aspect of Chinese culture, and eating out is one of the most common ways to honor guests, socialize, and deepen friendships.

Although Maoist programs made several attempts to curtail practice of traditional etiquette, proper etiquette is still very important to traditional Chinese people, who feel good manners invite luck and are indications of good educational status and upbringing, while boorish conduct brings shame; for example, misusing chopsticks at a formal dinner may embarrass one's own parents, who are responsible for teaching their children.

=== Personal behavior ===
Since chopsticks (and spoons) are used in place of forks and knives, Chinese cuisine tends to serve dishes in bite-size pieces or employ cooking techniques that render dishes such as fish or hong shao rou soft enough to be picked apart easily. Some common etiquette is:

Chopsticks are only used only to pick up food. The Chinese disapprove of spearing food with chopsticks although people sometimes do it if the food is too slippery. It is offensive for chopsticks to be used to point at people, pick teeth, bang the bowls, move the bowls, or to be chewed on or waved around. They are held so that the ends are even, and never separated in any way (such as holding one in each hand).

When not in use, chopsticks are left on chopstick rests when provided or placed across the bowl or plate. They are never to be left sticking upright out of food, evoking images of incense or "joss" sticks used ceremoniously at funerals.

Traditionally, a diner is supposed to hold the chopsticks in the right hand and hold down the bowl on the table or pick up the bowl close to the mouth with the left, or at least put the left hand upon the table and not down on the lap (in exceptional cases when eating with only one hand). (Traditionally, eating with the chopsticks held in the left hand or without both hands upon the table is perceived as rude, however, the view that these table manners are "rude" have started to be curtailed.) It is, however, never considered rude to lift a rice bowl with one hand to scoop rice into the mouth using chopsticks with the other hand.

Condiments, such as soy sauce, duck sauce, or sesame oil, are sometimes served in small shallow dishes to allow pieces of food to be dipped as desired. They may not be routinely provided at high-quality restaurants. The assumption is that perfectly prepared food needs no condiments, and the quality of the food can be best appreciated as prepared by the master chef.

It is considered virtuous for diners to not leave any bit of wasted food on their plates or bowls. If significant amounts of untouched food are left over in the serving dishes after a meal, it is often considered a compliment to the chef to request that it be packaged for takeout, to be enjoyed later at home.

=== Inviting guests ===
Although individual households have right to have own house rules, there are common traditional norms for how to invite and welcome guests which are largely the same throughout China.

Communal eating is very common in China, encompassing informal meals among close friends and family, as well as more formal meals and banquets to celebrate special occasions. In addition to providing opportunities for socializing, shared meals allow the diners to sample a wider range of dishes than if they were ordering individually.

=== Communal eating ===
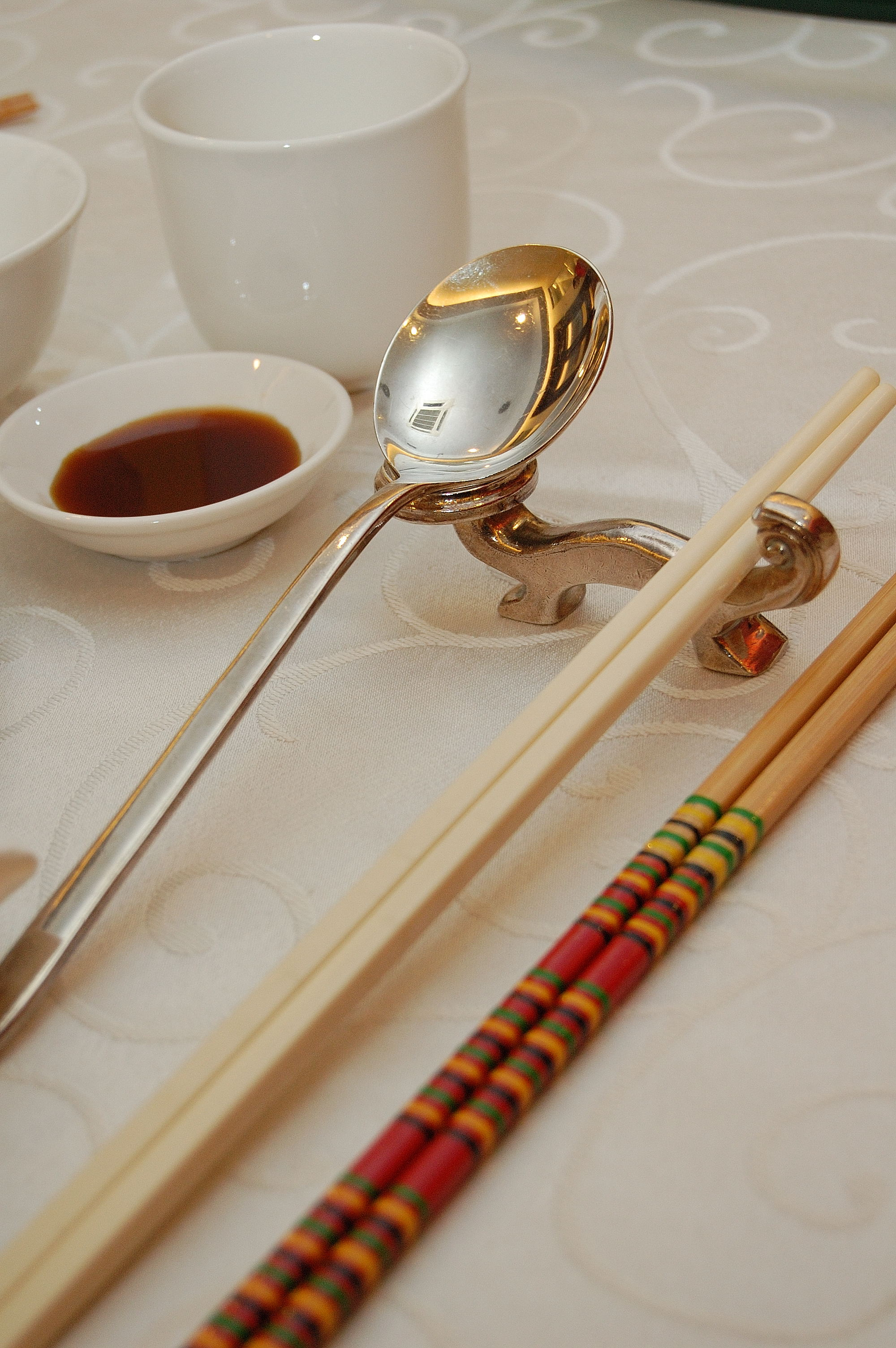
Serving chopsticks (gongkuai) on the far right, personal chopsticks (putongkuai or sikuai) in the middle, and a spoon. Serving chopsticks are usually more ornate and longer than the personal ones.

There appears to be no Chinese word for communal eating and using one's personal chopsticks in the serving dish. However, at some formal meals, there may be pairs of communal serving chopsticks (公筷, gongkuai). These are sets of chopsticks specifically for shared dishes only. Often, these will be distinct from the putongkuai (普通筷, regular chopsticks) or sikuai (私筷, personal chopsticks) in that they will be longer and more ornate.

There will sometimes be one set of communal chopsticks per dish or one set per course; the ratio varies. If there are no gongkuai set on the table, it is never rude to request that they be provided; others may just think that the person is a stickler for formality and good manners. With increased concerns about accidental transmission of food-borne diseases, various health authorities have campaigned for the use of serving utensils at the table, even at informal family meals.

It is considered extremely rude to dig for a choice food morsel on the serving plate instead of picking up the piece that is closest to the diner, thus demonstrating fairness and sharing with others. The shunned practice is sometimes called "digging one's grave". Likewise, it is impolite to hoard or take most of a dish until it has been offered to everyone and the other diners have had a chance to sample it. For this reason, it is common to take a smaller amount from the dishes on the first round, and to keep the other diners in mind when taking a larger second helping.

The last piece of food on a communal dish is never served to oneself without asking for permission. When offered the last bit of food, it may sometimes be considered rude to refuse the offer.

=== Lazy Susan (turntable) ===
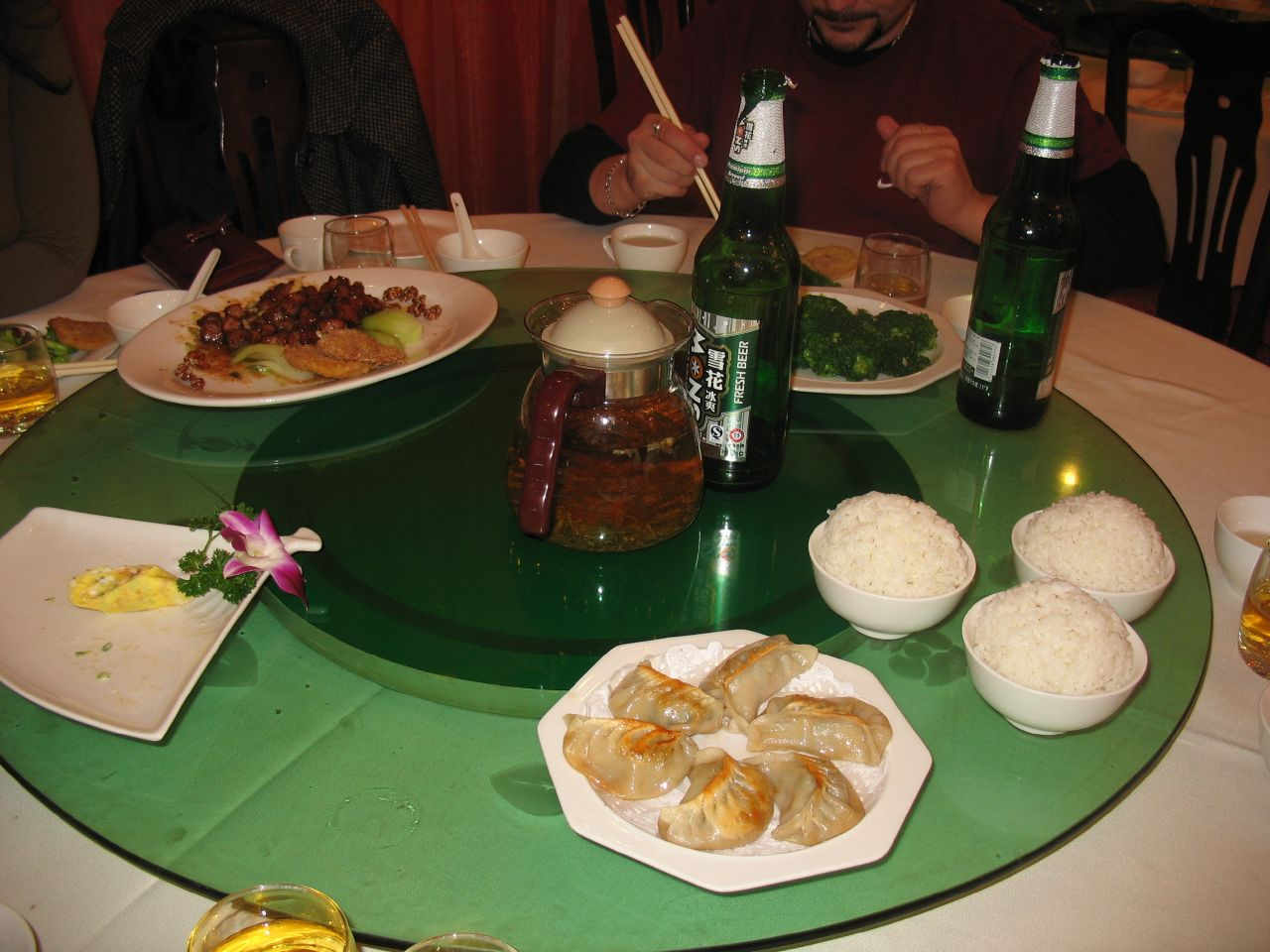
A Lazy Susan turntable in use

A Lazy Susan turntable is a large circular rotating platform placed at the center of a table, and used to easily share a large number of dishes among the diners. A Lazy Susan can be made from many materials, but most often they are constructed of glass, wood, or plastic.

It is typical for all the dishes for each course to be brought out together and placed around the perimeter of the Lazy Susan. If the turntable is large, a decorative centerpiece may occupy the center, since any food placed there would be out of reach of a seated diner. Alternatively, shared table condiments such as soy sauce, hot sauce, vinegar, or sesame oil may be located at the center.

If the dishes come out one at a time or if there is some special delicacy, they are typically served to the guest of honor first and then rotated clockwise around the table. The host will often wait to serve himself last. Dishes are typically not removed from the Lazy Susan and placed on the table: at most, a person is expected to hold the dish aloft while serving and then return it to its place on the tray. People try to avoid moving the Lazy Susan even slightly when someone is in the act of transferring food from the dishes to their plate or bowl.

=== Alcohol and other beverages ===
Water and other non-alcoholic beverages may be consumed at any time. However, in formal settings, alcohol should only be consumed during toasts. A modest toast may be followed by a single sip of wine or swallow of beer, but a baijiu toast is often ended with Ganbei! (干杯), an exhortation to drain the glass. Ideally, glasses are refilled immediately following a toast in preparation for the next.

In informal settings, individuals may order their preferred drinks. Carbonated beverages or beer are often ordered, although many diners may be satisfied with tea or hot water.

== Bill ==
The bill for the meal (often called the "check") is presented at the end of the meal, after all the food and drinks have been served. In most restaurants in Chinese countries, there is no tip expected unless it is explicitly posted. Usually, if there is a tip required, it will already be added to the bill. However, in Chinese restaurants in North America tips are usually expected, as is customary in other restaurants of the region.

It is a common sight for families to dispute over who pays the bill, as the person paying thereby demonstrates generosity, sincerity, and dominance. If somebody organizes a meal and invites the guests, that person is usually accorded the honor of paying for the event.

== See also ==
- Customs and etiquette in Japanese dining
- Culture of China
- Chinese cuisine
- Etiquette in Asia

== References and further reading ==
- Cooper, Gene (1986). "Chinese Table Manners: You Are How You Eat". Human Organization. 45 (2): 179–184. doi:10.17730/humo.45.2.4034u85x3058m025.
- Chao, Pu-wei Yang (1963). How to Cook and Eat in Chinese. New York: John Day. Internet Archive Free online Here Earlier editions in 1945, 1949, etc.
- Zhao, Rongguang. A History Of Food Culture In China. Singapore: World Scientific Publishing Company, 2015. ISBN 9781938368288
