= Itadakimasu =

Japanese phrase – "to humbly receive"

- Origin: Japanese: いただきます or 頂きます
- Context: traditionally said prior to eating a meal as a way of expressing gratitude
- Meaning: 'to humbly receive'

Itadakimasu (Japanese: いただきます or 頂きます; IPA: [itadakimaꜜsɯ̥]) is a Japanese phrase that translates 'to humbly receive'. Often said before eating a meal, the phrase is used as a way of showing gratitude and respect for everyone and everything that made the meal in front of you possible. It is meant to honor all: from the natural elements that supplied the ingredients, the people who grew the produce, to the ones who prepared and cooked the meal, etc.

The term compounds the Japanese verb itadaku (いただく; 'to receive'/'to accept') and the suffix -masu (ます), added to the end of verbs to make sentences polite.

== History ==
The term Itadakimasu can be traced back to ancient Japan's Asuka period when Buddhism was the dominant religion in the region. In contrast to western religions, which have a hierarchy (God > people > animals > etc.), eastern religion, specifically Buddhism, views all on an equal level, and as a result, uses Itadakimasu as a symbolistic phrase to share their respect and honor.

== Popularization ==
Despite the great amount of history on this word, the earliest piece of documentation surrounding the word itadakimasu is from 1812, in a book called Kōkō Michibiki Gusa. In this etiquette rule book, there reads a passage: "箸(はし)取(と)らば、天地(あめつち)御代(みよ)の御恵(おんめぐ)み、主君(しゅくん)や親(おや)の御恩(ごおん)あぢわゑ", which translates to "When taking up my chopsticks, I shall savor the blessings of heaven, earth, and this peaceful reign, as well as the kindness of my master and my parents". To summarize, the text implies that before eating, you should take a moment to honor and appreciate what you have; all nature, animals, the emperor, and your parents.

When the book was released to the public (popularized during the Shōwa period), the habit of saying itadakimasu before meals was heavily encouraged by the Jōdo-Shinshū sect of Buddhism, slowly leading to the integration of the phrase into daily life and the cultural prominence it has today.

== Cultural impact ==
The Japanese believe that the integration of the word itadakimasu in their culture has impacted their society in their values of mindfulness, community, and the joy of sharing a loving experience with others, through the simple gesture of gratitude and respect towards food, nature, and one another, ingrained into their culture by the use of this phrase. As this word is taught at a young age in Japanese culture, the Japanese believe that it influences their children's emotional development by educating that the words they use have a larger emotional meaning to them, and that there is a reason to put your feelings into them.

== See also ==
- Customs and etiquette in Japanese dining
- Honorific speech in Japanese
