= Oshibori =

Wet hand towel

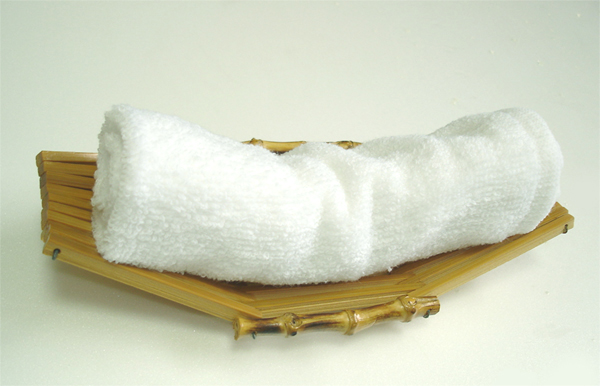
Oshibori presented on a small bamboo stand

An oshibori (おしぼり or お絞り), or hot towel in English, is a wet hand towel offered to customers in places such as restaurants or bars, and used to clean one's hands before eating. Oshibori have long been part of hospitality culture in Japan: during the Heian era, it was used for visitors; during the Edo period it was used in hatago; later, it started to be used in many restaurants. It eventually spread to worldwide use. Cold oshibori are used in summer, and hot oshibori in winter. In Japan, October 29 has been observed as the day of oshibori since 2004.

== Etymology ==
The word oshibori comes from the Japanese verb shiboru (絞る), meaning "to wring", with the honorific prefix o-. In Japanese script, the word oshibori is normally written in hiragana (おしぼり), and seldom using kanji (お絞り or 御絞り).

Oshibori are also known as o-tefuki; tefuki, which refers to ordinary handkerchiefs, derives from the Japanese te (手) (hand) and fuku (拭く), to wipe.

In mah-jong parlors, the words atsushibo and tsumeshibo, from the Japanese adjectives atsui (熱い), hot, and tsumetai (冷たい), cold, are sometimes used to refer to hot and cold oshibori respectively.

== Typical oshibori ==
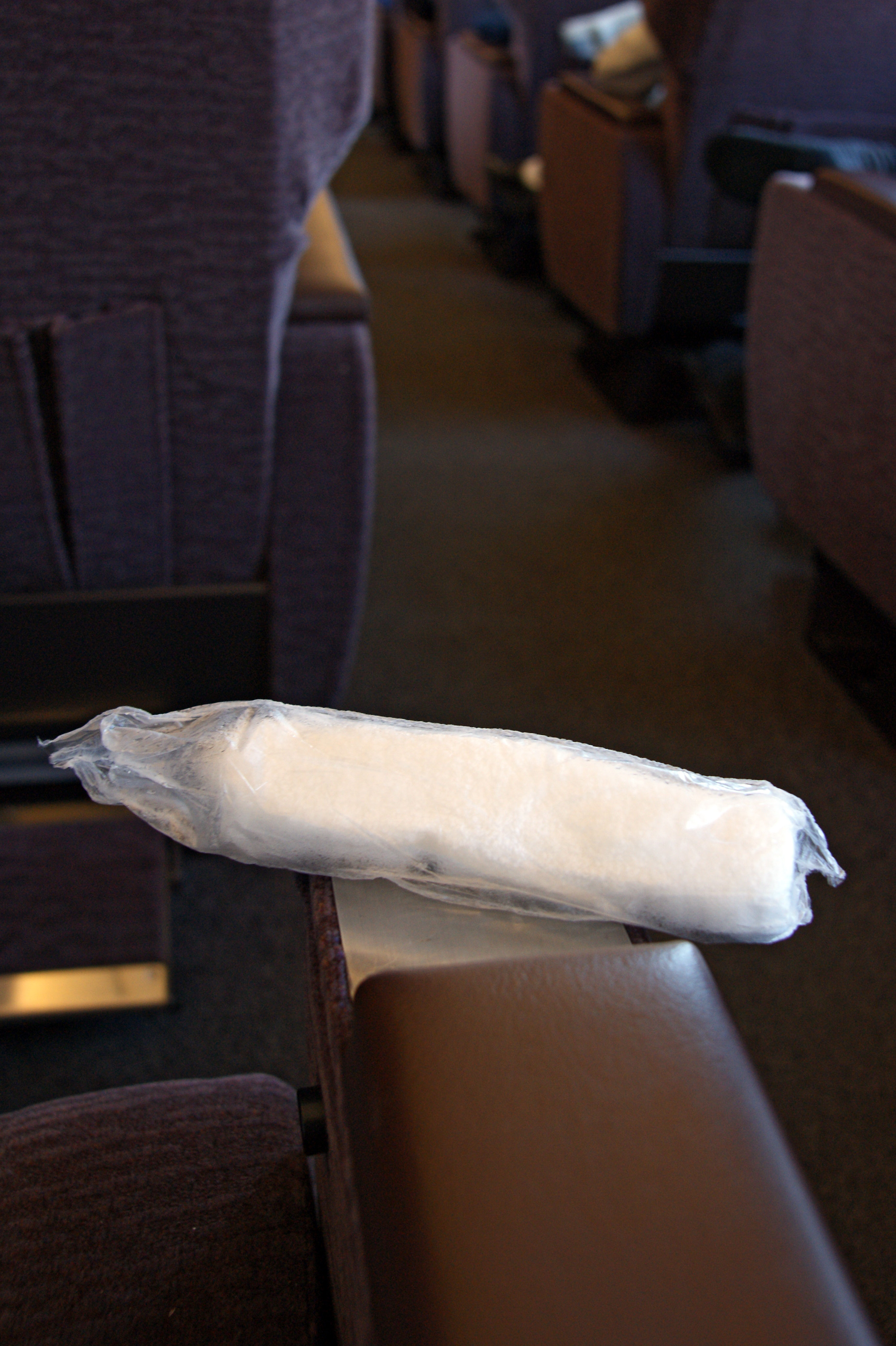
Oshibori in a JR express train, Japan

A typical oshibori, made of cloth, is dampened with water and wrung. It is then placed on the dining table for customers to wipe their hands before or during the meal. The oshibori is often rolled or folded and given to the customer on some kind of tray. Even if a tray is not used, it is usually rolled up into a long, thin shape, although this is not necessarily the case with oshibori provided with bento lunch boxes.

Many establishments also give out towels made of non-woven cloth or paper, which are generally used once and then disposed of. Paper ones sometimes contain a sterilizing agent such as alcohol or stabilized chlorine dioxide. Paper oshibori, as well as cloth oshibori, are often folded and sealed into a plastic wrapping for inclusion with packaged products such as bento lunch boxes in convenience stores, or to pass out at weddings, corporate events, or hospitality-related venues.

== Hot and cold oshibori ==
An oshibori can be moistened with hot water at an appropriate temperature or steam to make a hot oshibori, or placed damp into a refrigerator to make a cold oshibori suitable for use in summer. Restaurants usually use an electric appliance such as a heating cabinet or refrigerator for this.

== Rented oshibori ==
As many establishments use oshibori in large quantities, they often do not prepare them in the store, but instead employ a rental service which launders them, rolls them into the typical cylindrical shape, and delivers them already damp. These rental service companies frequently wrap each oshibori individually in a clear, lightweight plastic seal (polyethylene film), which can be easily broken and removed by the customer before using.

== Oshibori dispensers ==
Some beauty salons and dental clinics prefer to use a standalone oshibori dispenser, where a freshly made towel is prepared at the client's request. In this case, the towels are often made of a non-woven fiber.

== Around the world ==
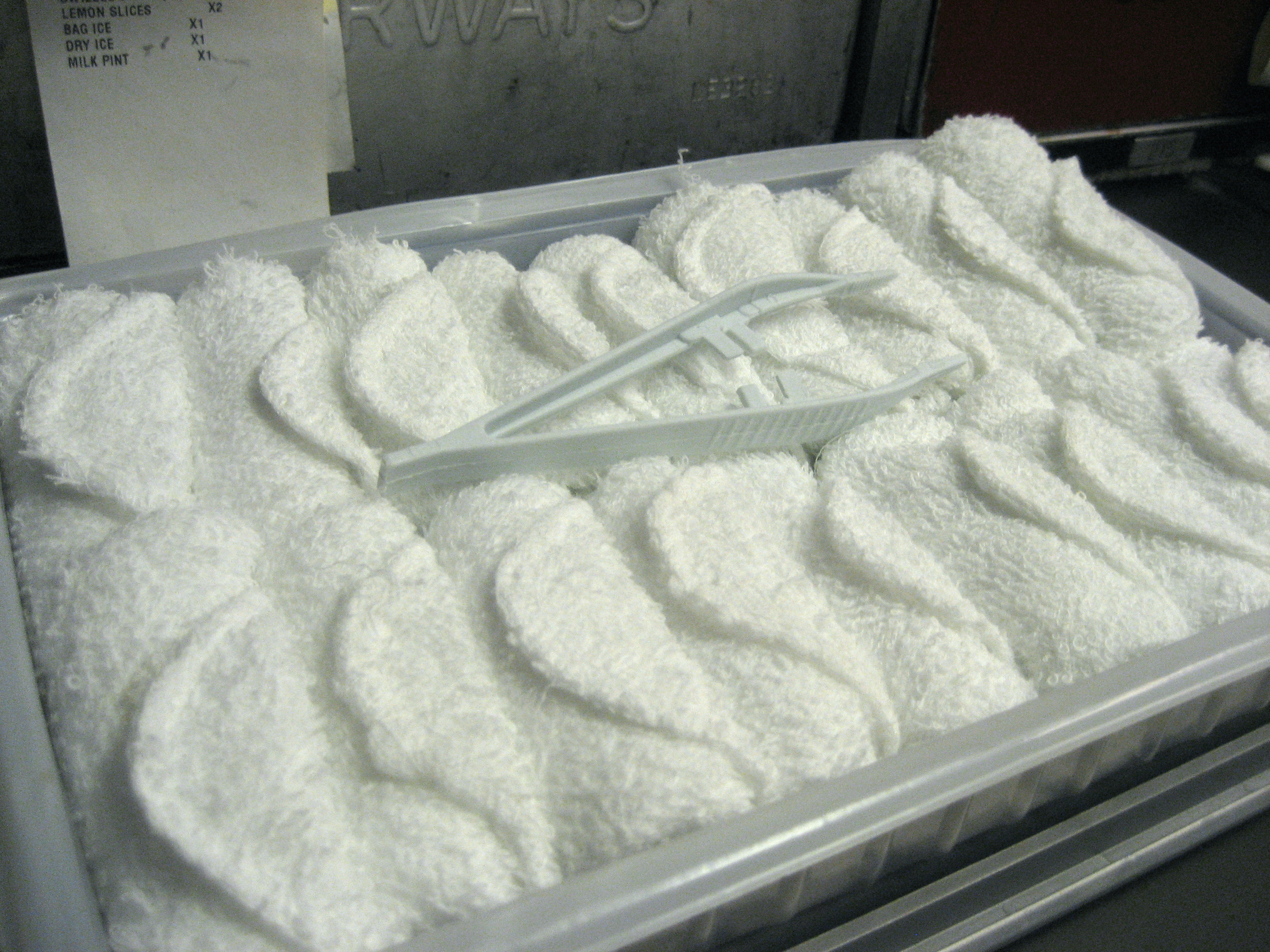
Small hot towels are often distributed to airline business class passengers. Disposable towels seen here prior to preparation.

Oshibori is usually translated as "hot towel". Most airlines distribute hot towels to first and business class passengers prior to the first meal on long haul flights, while some airlines distribute them to passengers in premium economy class as well. The heated towel used in barbers’ shops to moisturize the skin or beard and make it easier to shave can also be thought of as a type of oshibori. Oshibori Towels are becoming more and more prevalent at hospitality businesses in various countries, as people (and hosts) discover this touch of Japanese hospitality is suitable anywhere there are hosts wanting to connect with their visitors and show that they care.

== See also ==
- Wet wipe

== Sources ==
- Much of this article was translated from the equivalent article in the Japanese Wikipedia, as retrieved on November 26, 2006.
