= Honorific speech in Japanese =

Grammatical and syntactical feature of Japanese

The Japanese language has a system of honorific speech, referred to as keigo (Japanese: 敬(けい)語(ご); literally "respectful language"), parts of speech one function of which is to show that the speaker wants to convey respect for either the listener or someone mentioned in the utterance. Their use is widely seen in a variety of business or formal social situations. Honorifics in Japanese can also be used to show unfamiliarity (social distance), or they can be used to show that the speaker is cultured and sophisticated enough to have mastered the ins and outs of the system. Japanese honorific titles, often simply called honorifics, consist of suffixes and prefixes when referring to others in a conversation.

The system is very extensive, having its own special vocabulary and grammatical forms to express various levels of respectful, humble, and polite speech. It closely resembles other honorifics systems found in the East Asian cultural sphere, such as honorifics in Korean.

== Introduction ==
Japanese uses honorific constructions to show or emphasize social rank, social intimacy or similarity in rank. The choice of pronoun used, for example, will express the social relationship between the person speaking and the person being referred to, and Japanese often avoids pronouns entirely in favor of more explicit titles or kinship terms.

Honorific speech is often longer, and sometimes much longer, than more direct speech; longer honorific forms are generally more polite than shorter ones. Some examples include the following:

When asking a question: the first is casually between friends, the second is a junior person asking a superior in a formal meeting:

- 聞(き)いていい？

Kiite ii?

Ok to ask (a question)?

- 聞(き)かせていただけると嬉(うれ)しいのですが。

Kikasete-itadakeru to ureshii no desu ga.

I would, however, be delighted if I may be permitted to ask (a question).

When asking for cooperation: the first is usual and polite, the latter is very formal, using the humble verb mōshiageru.

- ご協(きょう)力(りょく)下(くだ)さい。

Go-kyōryoku-kudasai.

Your cooperation, please.

- ご協(きょう)力(りょく)の程(ほど)お願(ねが)い申(もう)し上(あ)げます。

Go-kyōryoku no hodo o-negai mōshiagemasu.

We respectfully request the favor of a measure of your cooperation.

This latter example includes two honorific prefixes, nominalization of a verb (for formality), a respectful form, and two humble forms.

== Types of honorifics ==
Honorifics in Japanese, or keigo (Japanese: 敬(けい)語(ご)), fall under three main categories: polite language (Japanese: 丁(てい)寧(ねい)語(ご), Hepburn: teineigo), respectful language (Japanese: 尊(そん)敬(けい)語(ご), Hepburn: sonkeigo), and humble language (Japanese: 謙(けん)譲(じょう)語(ご), Hepburn: kenjōgo), also translated as modest language. (Note: kenjōgo (Japanese: 謙(けん)譲(じょう)語(ご)) is more rarely called kensongo (謙(けん)遜(そん)語(ご)), kenson (Japanese: 謙(けん)遜(そん)) being an alternative word for "humility, modesty".) Linguistically the first is an addressee honorific, used for someone being talked to, and the latter two are referent honorifics, used for someone being talked about. Sometimes two more categories are also used, for a total of five categories: "courteous language" (Japanese: 丁(てい)重(ちょう)語(ご), Hepburn: teichōgo) and "word beautification" (Japanese: 美(び)化(か)語(ご), Hepburn: bikago), but more often these are included in the above three: teichōgo as a kind of humble language, bikago as a kind of polite language. These two other categories use the same forms as the general categories, but are used in different contexts, and therefore are differentiated by some linguists. Each type of speech has its own vocabulary and verb endings.

For example, the standard form of the verb "to do" is suru (する). This form is appropriate with family members and close friends. The polite form of suru (する), the addressee honorific, is shimasu (します). This form is appropriate in most daily interactions. When showing respect, such as when talking about a customer or a superior, however, the respectful word nasaru (なさる) and its polite form nasaimasu are used, and when referring to one's own actions or the actions of a group member, the humble word itasu and its polite form itashimasu (いたします) are used. These respectful and humble words are referent honorifics, and thus can coexist with addressee honorific -masu.

=== Polite language ===
Polite language (Japanese: 丁(てい)寧(ねい)語(ご), Hepburn: teineigo) is characterized by the use of the sentence ending desu (です) and the verb ending masu (ます) and the use of prefixes such as o (お) and go (ご) towards neutral objects. It is the form of the language first taught to most learners of Japanese.

Polite language can be used to refer to one's own actions or those of other people.

=== Respectful language ===
Respectful language (Japanese: 尊(そん)敬(けい)語(ご), Hepburn: sonkeigo) is a special form or alternative word used when talking about superiors and customers. It is not used to talk about oneself. For example, when a Japanese hairdresser or dentist requests their client to take a seat, they say "O-kake ni natte kudasai" (「お掛(か)けになってください」) to mean "Please sit down". However, they would use the verb suwaru (座(すわ)る) rather than "O-kake ni naru" (「お掛(か)けになる」) to refer to themselves sitting down. The respectful version of language can only be used to refer to others.

In general, respectful language is directed at those in positions of power; for example, a superior at work, or a customer. It also implies that the speaker is acting in a professional capacity.

It is characterized by lengthy polite expressions. Common verbs may be replaced by more polite alternative verbs, for example, する, suru (do) by なさる, nasaru, or 話す, hanasu (talk) by おっしゃる ossharu when the subject is a person of respect. Some of these transformations are many-to-one: 行(い)く, iku (go), 来(く)る, kuru (come), and いる, iru (be) all become いらっしゃる, irassharu, and 食(た)べる, taberu (eat) and 飲(の)む, nomu (drink) both become 召(め)し上(あ)がる, meshiagaru.

Verbs may also be changed to respectful forms. One respectful form is a modification of the verb with a prefix and a polite suffix. For example, 読(よ)む, yomu (read) becomes o-yomi ni naru, with the prefix o- added to the i-form of the verb, and the verb ending ni naru. The verb ending -(r)areru can also be used, such as yomareru.

Nouns also undergo substitution to express respect. The normal Japanese word for person hito (人) becomes kata (方) in respectful language. Thus, a customer would normally be expected to be referred to as a kata rather than a hito.

=== Humble language ===
In general, humble language is used when describing one's actions or the actions of a person in one's in-group to others such as customers in business. Humble language tends to imply that one's actions are taking place in order to assist the other person.

Humble language (謙譲語, kenjōgo) is similar to respectful language, in substituting verbs with other forms. For example: suru (do) becomes itasu, and morau (receive) becomes itadaku. These two verbs are also seen in set phrases such as dō itashimashite (you're welcome) and itadakimasu (いただきます—a phrase said before eating or drinking).

Similar to respectful language, verbs can also change their form by adding a prefix and the verb "suru" or "itasu". For example, motsu (carry) becomes o mochi shimasu. The use of humble forms may imply doing something for the other person; thus a Japanese person might offer to carry something for someone else by saying o mochi shimasu. This type of humble form also appears in the set phrase o matase shimashita, "I am sorry to have kept you waiting", from mataseru (make wait) with the addition of o and shimasu. Similarly, o negai shimasu, "please [do this]", from negau (request or hope for), again with the addition of o and shimasu.

Even more politely, the form motasete itadaku literally means "humbly be allowed to carry". This phrase would be used to express the idea that "I will carry it if you please."

A distinction may also be made between humble speech where the intent is to raise up the recipient of an action, and where there is no specific recipient of the action, lowering the speaker instead with respect to the listener, as in the common phrase 電車が参ります (densha ga mairimasu "a train is arriving") at rail stations. In the case, the train itself (as an extension of the railway company) is not lowered with respect to a specific recipient of the action of arrival; the humble language is merely a courtesy to the passengers hearing the announcement, whom the company is raising up by lowering itself. Some linguists distinguish this from kenjōgo (whose purpose is to raise up the recipient of a polite action by lowering the speaker), calling it instead teichōgo (丁重語) "courteous language", and defining it formally as:

Honorifics by which the Speaker shows consideration to the hearer through all expressions of the subject matter.

This category was first proposed by Hiroshi Miyachi (宮地裕). Teichōgo, as an addressee honorific, is always used with the teineigo (-masu) form, the politeness sequence (using "go" as an example) being 行く, 行きます, 参ります (iku, ikimasu, mairimasu).

In humble language, name suffixes are dropped when referring to people from inside one's group. Thus, Japanese-speaking company executives would introduce themselves and their team by saying "I am Gushiken, the president, and this is Niwa, the CEO", dropping the honorific that would otherwise be expected when referring to another person.

Similarly to respectful language, nouns can also change. The word hito (人), meaning "person", becomes mono (者). The humble version is used when referring to oneself or members of one's group, such as one's company; when humble language is split into the dual classification above, this is a kind of teichōgo (丁重語) as a courtesy to the out-group listener.

=== Respectful verbs ===
Irregular respectful verb forms
meaning	dictionary form	polite (teineigo)	respectful (sonkeigo)	humble (kenjōgo)
see / look / watch	見(み)る (miru)	見(み)ます (mimasu)	ご覧(らん)になる (go-ran ni naru)	拝(はい)見(けん)する (haiken suru)
meet	会(あ)う (au)	会(あ)います (aimasu)	お会(あ)いになる (o-ai ni naru)	お目(め)に掛(か)かる (o-me ni kakaru)
be (inanimate)^{1}	ある (aru)	あります (arimasu)		ござる (gozaru)
be (animate)^{1}	いる (iru)	います (imasu)	いらっしゃる (irassharu)	おる (oru)
come / go^{1}	来(く)る (kuru; come) 行(い)く (iku; go)	来(き)ます (kimasu) 行(い)きます (ikimasu)	おいでになる (o-ide ni naru) いらっしゃる (irassharu)	伺(うかが)う (ukagau; to respectful location) 参(まい)る (mairu; otherwise)
know	知(し)る (shiru)	知(し)ります (shirimasu)	ご存(ぞん)じ (go-zonji)	存じ上げる (zonji ageru)
eat / drink	食べる (taberu; eat) 飲む (nomu; drink)	食べます (tabemasu) 飲みます (nomimasu)	召し上がる (meshi-agaru)	いただく (itadaku)
receive	もらう (morau)	もらいます (moraimasu)		いただく (itadaku)^{2} 頂戴する (chōdai-suru)^{2}
give (when the receiver is respected)	あげる (ageru; once the humble form) やる (yaru; considered rude today, except in Kansai dialect)	あげます (agemasu)		差しあげる (sashiageru)
give (when the giver is respected)	くれる (kureru)	くれます (kuremasu)	くださる (kudasaru)	
do	する (suru)	します (shimasu)	なさる (nasaru)	致す (itasu)
say	言う (iu)	言います (iimasu)	おっしゃる (ossharu)	申し上げる (mōshi-ageru) 申す (mōsu)
put on (clothing)	着る (kiru)	着ます (kimasu)	お召しになる (omeshi ni naru)	
sleep	寝る (neru)	寝ます (nemasu)	お休みになる (o-yasumi ni naru)	
die	死ぬ (shinu)	死にます (shinimasu)	お亡くなりになる (o-nakunari ni naru)	
ask	聞く (kiku) 尋ねる (tazuneru)	聞きます (kikimasu) 尋ねます (tazunemasu)		伺う (ukagau)
visit	訪ねる (tazuneru)	訪ねます (tazunemasu)		伺う (ukagau)

^{1} The distinction between these three verbs is lost in some respectful forms.
^{2} Both are the humble form of もらう (morau; receive); it can also be used for related verbs like 食べる (taberu; eat) and 飲む (nomu; drink).

=== Word beautification ===
Word beautification (bikago, 美化語, "beautified speech", in tanka also sometimes gago, 雅語, "elegant speech") is the practice of making words more polite or "beautiful". This form of language is employed by the speaker to add refinement to one's manner of speech. Patricia Wetzel has pointed out that many of the Japanese grammarians who write about "beautification" are not talking about a set of specific forms in Japanese, but rather the pragmatic function of much of keigo that helps the person using it sound cultured or sophisticated. One aspect of keigo is adding the prefix o- or go- to a word and used in conjunction with the polite form of verbs. In the following example, o- before cha and senbei and the polite form of the verb are used to this effect. Generally o- is used before native Japanese words and go- is used before Sino-Japanese words, but there are exceptions.

お茶にお煎餅、よく合いますね
O-cha ni o-senbei, yoku aimasu ne
Tea and rice crackers go well (together), don't they?

In finer classifications, the above example is classified as word beautification—rather than honorific speech—as the speaker is voicing a general opinion regarding tea and rice crackers and is not intentionally deferential towards the listener. In the following example, the speaker is directly referring to the listener and items received by them and is regarded as honorific language:

お宅様からいただいたお菓子は大変おいしゅうございました
O-taku-sama kara itadaita okashi wa taihen oishuugozaimashita
The sweets you gave me were most delectable.

See the section on honorific prefixes, below, for further discussion.

== Usage ==
=== Business ===
Honorifics are considered extremely important in a business setting. Training in honorifics usually does not take place at school or university, but directly at the company.

=== In groups and out groups ===
When using polite or respectful forms, the point of view of the speaker is shared by the speaker's in-group (内 uchi), so in-group referents do not take honorifics. For example, members of one's own company are referred to with humble forms when speaking with an external person; similarly, family members of the speaker are referred to humbly when speaking to guests. Similarly, the out-group (外 soto) addressee or referent is always mentioned in the polite style (though not necessarily with honorifics).

Mastery of politeness and honorifics is important for functioning in Japanese society. Leaving out honorifics expresses a different relationship from using them, while using the same set phrases with everyone, regardless of the situation, can leave listeners uncomfortable. Native-speaking children master the informal style first, while most textbooks for learners of Japanese begin with the polite style.

==== Intrafamilial address ====
Similar to how titles are used instead of personal pronouns when addressing a person of higher status, roles and kinship terms are used in intrafamilial settings where one can refer to other family members by using their role in relation to the speaker instead of a personal pronoun. For example, older relatives cannot be addressed as anata, kimi or simply by their name alone. Instead, a term denoting their relationship with the speaker or their name suffixed by an appropriate kinship term is used, such as otōsan when speaking to one's father. Those younger than the speaker can generally be addressed by using personal pronouns or their name. Thus, the choice of whether a family member can be addressed by using a personal pronoun, their name or their role is dependent on the position of the speaker within the family.

=== Gender differences ===
Depending on the situation, women's speech may contain more honorifics than men's. In particular, in informal settings, women are more likely to use polite vocabulary and honorific prefixes, such as gohan o taberu to mean "eat rice", whereas men may use less polite vocabulary such as meshi o kū with exactly the same meaning. Women also do not normally use the blunt negative imperative na. This is part of a general pattern of speech differences by sex.

== Grammatical overview ==
Japanese has grammatical functions to express several different pragmatic registers. Not only politeness but also respectfulness, humility and formality can be expressed.

=== Expressing politeness ===
There are three levels of politeness, plain or direct (普通体 futsūtai or 常体 jōtai), polite or distal (敬体 keitai or 丁寧 teinei), and formal (generally, 敬語 keigo or 最敬体 saikeitai). Formal and polite can be combined. For example, for the sentence "This is a book",

plain	plain formal	polite	polite formal	very polite formal
これは本だ kore wa hon da.	これは本である kore wa hon dearu.	これは本です kore wa hon desu.	これは本であります kore wa hon de arimasu.	これは本でございます kore wa hon de gozaimasu.

The informal style is used among friends, the distal or polite style by inferiors when addressing superiors and among strangers or casual acquaintances, and the formal style generally in writing or prepared speeches. The plain formal and informal styles of verbs are nearly identical, with a few grammatical differences, such as the verb de aru being used as a formal copula, and the preferential usage of verb stems to connect clauses instead of the "te form". Formal language in Japanese also uses different vocabulary and structures from informal language.

In some contexts, where both the imperfective (incomplete: present/future) and perfective (complete: past) tenses are acceptable, the perfective is considered more polite. This is only at the completion of an activity; common examples are ありがとうございました arigatō gozaimashita "thank you (for a completed favor)", ご馳走様でした go-chisō-sama deshita "it was a feast (for a completed meal)", 失礼しました shitsurei shimashita "I have been rude (when leaving, after a visit)". For example, when entering someone's office, one conventionally says 失礼します shitsurei shimasu, as the visit is not complete yet, while when exiting one may say either shitsurei shimasu or, more politely, 失礼しました shitsurei shimashita. Many phrases cannot be used in the perfective in this way, as the referent is as yet incomplete. For example, the standard greeting お早うございます ohayō gozaimasu "Good morning" (lit. "It is early") cannot be said as ×お早うございました *ohayō gozaimashita "It was early", as it is used only during the morning.

=== Expressing respect ===
Further to this, there is another factor, respect, which is indicated in yet other ways. For each politeness level there are two respectful forms (敬語, keigo).

1. The respect language (尊敬語, sonkeigo) form shows respect to the subject of the sentence.
2. The humble language (謙譲語, kenjōgo) form gives respect to the (direct or indirect) object or to the listener by a variety of means, the most common being to humble the speaker.

These respectful forms are represented by different verb endings. Since verbs come at the end of the sentence in Japanese, most of the factors of formality, politeness, and respect are expressed at the very end of each sentence.

Plain form
ジョンさんが佐藤さんを待つ

Jon san ga Satō san o matsu.
John waits for Sato.

Respect for subject
先生がお待ちになる

Sensei ga o-machi-ni-naru.
(The) teacher waits.

Respect for object
先生をお待ちする

Sensei o o-machi-suru.
We wait for you, Teacher.

The o-machi-suru humble forms carry an implication that the waiting or other activity is being (humbly) done by the speaker for the benefit of the person being addressed. Thus a humble sentence is unlikely to take a third person subject. For example, a sentence like jon ga sensei o o machi suru (John waits for the teacher) is unlikely to occur.

== Honorific titles ==
Honorific suffixes and prefixes are used when referring to others in a conversation. They reflect not only the level of politeness chosen, but also the relative social rank or the degree of intimacy between people. For example, a person might refer to their classmate or colleague as Asada-san ("Mr./Ms. Asada"), but to their little son as Hideyo-chan ("li'l Hideyo"). Referring to somebody without using a honorific is a sign of great informality or intimacy.

The most common honorifics include:

Honorific	Approximate equivalent	Used for
San (さん)	Mr. / Ms.	Adults of equal status, informally and formally
Sama (様, さま)	Sir / Ma'am	People of higher status (including deities, guests, customers)
Kun (君, くん)	Boy, bro	People of junior status, boys, or among male friends
Chan (ちゃん)	Little...	Small children, something or somebody cute, close friends
Tan (たん)	Widdle...	Babies, moe anthropomorphisms
Senpai (先輩、せんぱい)	–	Senior colleague or classmate
Sensei (先生、せんせい)	Mr./Dr./Professor/etc.	Authority figures (teachers, doctors, lawyers, authors...)

== Requests ==
Japanese requests and commands have many set forms depending on who is being addressed by whom. For example, the phrase "I ask your favor" (よろしくお願いします, yoroshiku o-negai shimasu), can take various forms. At the bottom of the scale comes

よろしく頼(たの)む
yoroshiku tanomu

which might be used among close friends. Its more polite variant

よろしく頼(たの)みます
yoroshiku tanomimasu

might be used towards less familiar people or to superiors.

Going up in politeness, the phrase

よろしくお願(ねが)いします
yoroshiku o-negai shimasu

means the same thing, but is used in business settings. It is possible to go further, replacing the polite shimasu (します) with the humble itashimasu (致します), to get

よろしくお願(ねが)い致(いた)します
yoroshiku o-negai itashimasu.

In very formal Japanese, this may be replaced with an even more polite expression using the humble verb mōshiageru

よろしくお願(ねが)い申(もう)し上(あ)げます
yoroshiku o-negai mōshiagemasu.

When making requests, at the bottom of the politeness scale comes the plain imperative "tabero" (「食べろ」) or "kue" (「食え」), literally "Eat!". Similarly, the no/n da (の・ん だ) suffix can make an order: "taberu n da" (「食べるんだ」), or "kū n da" (「食うんだ」), "Eat!".

Negatives are formed by adding suffix na: taberu na "do not eat", gomi o suteru na: "do not throw away rubbish". Similarly, the negative of da, ja nai, can be used: taberu n ja nai.

More polite, but still strict, is the nasai suffix, which attaches to the i-form of the verb. This originates in the polite verb nasaru. Tabenasai thus is an order perhaps given by a parent to a child.

Requests can also be formed by adding to the "te" form of a verb. The plainest form adds kure, an irregular form of the verb kureru, to the te form. For example, tabete kure or kutte kure: "eat it", less forceful than "tabero". Negatives are made by using the negative "te" form: tabenaide kure or kuwanaide kure "don't eat it".

Going up one scale in politeness, the more polite verb kudasai is added. For example, tabete kudasai. With this polite form, the rough kū verb is unlikely to be used. Similarly, tabenaide kudasai: "please don't eat it".

A similar entry on the scale of politeness is made by using the imperative form of a polite verb. For example, meshiagaru, the polite verb for "to eat", when turned into meshiagare, the imperative, becomes the response to the set phrase itadakimasu.

Further, more polite forms are also possible. These involve the "i-form" of the verb rather than the "te form", and an honorific prefix (see honorific prefixes: verbs, below). Beyond simply increased politeness, this form is more formal, and is used when addressing a group, or as a general instruction, rather than directed at a particular person. For example, tsukau, "use", becomes o tsukai kudasai: "please use this". In the case of phrasal verbs the honorific o appears before the entire phrase, not simply the verb, as in o-ki (w)o tsuke-kudasai (お気を付け下さい), from ki (w)o tsukeru (気を付ける). Politeness can be carried even further by conjugating kudasaru into its masu form and using the imperative, which becomes "o tsukai kudasaimase."

== Honorific prefixes ==
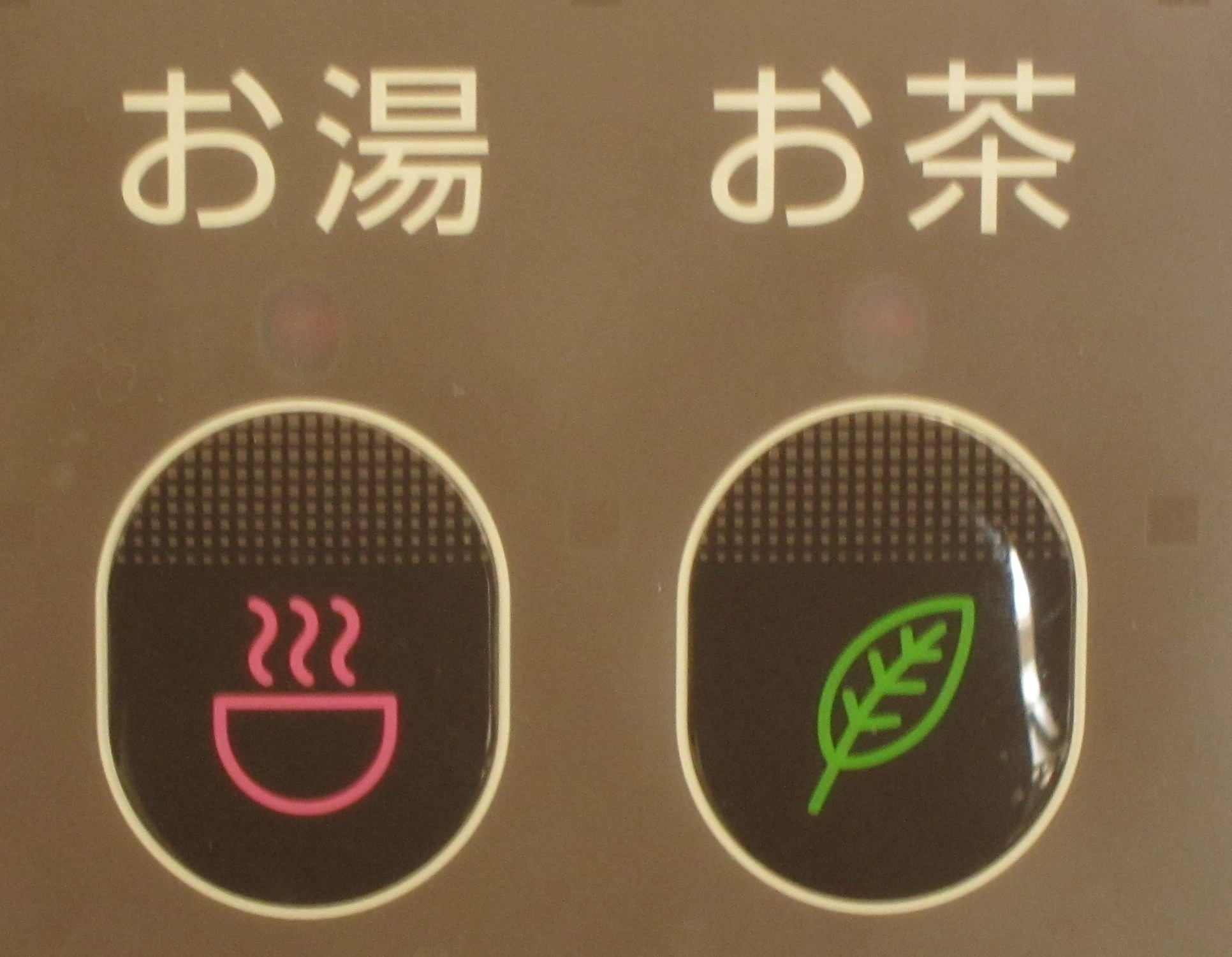
The beautifying prefixes o- (お〜) and go- (ご〜) are commonly used for certain words, such as お湯 (o-yu) and o-cha (お茶)—hot water and tea—on this tea machine.

The bikago (beautifying) prefixes o- (お〜) and go- (ご〜) (both written with the character 御〜 in kanji) are honorific prefixes which are applied to nouns and in some contexts to verbs. In general, go- (the on'yomi) precedes Sino-Japanese words (that is, words borrowed from Chinese or made from Sino-Japanese elements), while o- (the kun'yomi) precedes native Japanese words. There are many exceptions, however, where the o- prefix is used for Sino-Japanese words, including お茶 (o-cha, 'tea'), お大事に (o-daiji-ni, 'get well'), お電話 (o-denwa, 'telephone'), お稽古 (o-keiko, 'practice'), お宅 (o-taku, 'home/you'), and many others. There is also one common exception for the go- prefix, ごゆっくり (go-yukkuri, 'slowly'), where the main word is clearly not of Chinese origin.

These prefixes are used for two purposes: to speak respectfully about a stranger or social superior's family, belongings, or actions (as part of 尊敬語 (sonkeigo)); or to speak in a generally refined or polite way (敬語 (keigo) generally, specifically 美化語 (bikago)).

=== Prefix usage ===
As with honorific word forms and titles, honorific prefixes are used when referring to or speaking with a social superior, or speaking about a superior's actions or possessions, but not usually when referring to oneself or one's own actions or possessions, or those of one's in-group.

For example, when referring to one's own order at a restaurant, one would use chūmon, but when referring to a customer's order, the restaurant staff would use go-chūmon. Similarly, kazoku means "my family", while go-kazoku means "your family" (or, broadly speaking, someone else's family).

There are some words which frequently or always take these prefixes, regardless of who is speaking and to whom; these are often ordinary items which may have particular cultural significance, such as tea (o-cha) and rice (go-han). The word meshi, the Japanese equivalent of Sino-Japanese go-han, is considered rough and masculine (男性語 (danseigo, men's language)). The honorific o- is also sometimes attached to verb stems (連用形, ren'yōkei; continuative form, -masu stem—see stem forms) of native verbs (hence native o-) to refer to a specific item associated with the verb, as in お絞り、絞る (oshibori, 'hot towel') and お握り、握る and お結び、結ぶ (onigiri/omusubi, 'rice ball').

In rare cases, both a base form and honorific are in use with different readings. A notable example is 利益 (ri-eki, 'benefit, profit (e.g., business)') and 御利益 (go-ri-yaku, 'divine favor, grace'); plain ri-yaku is sometimes used, but go-ri-eki is generally not. The former, an everyday term, uses the usual kan-on reading, while the later, a specialized religious term, uses the older go-on reading.

As with other polite speech, honorific prefixes are used more by women than by men.

In tea ceremony, common ingredients and equipment always take the honorific o- or go-, including water (o-mizu), hot water (o-yu), and tea bowls (o-chawan). However, these terms are often heard in daily life as well.

Foreign loanwords (gairaigo, except those that come from Chinese; see above) seldom take honorifics, but when they do o- seems to be preferable to go-. Examples are o-bīru (ビール (bīru, 'beer')), which can sometimes be heard at restaurants, o-kādo (カード (kādo, 'card', as in credit card or point card)), which is often heard at supermarkets and department stores, and o-sōsu (ソース (sōsu, 'sauce')). Other words take go-, such as go-akusesu (アクセス (akusesu, 'access')), common on websites.

=== Verbs ===
For verbs, a respectful request—or rather a polite command—addressed to a group may be formed by using 御〜, followed by the masu-stem (連用形), followed by 下さい (kudasai, 'please'). For Chinese verbs (kango + suru), the prefix is generally pronounced go-, while for native Japanese verbs the prefix is pronounced o-. This is generally written in kana. The most commonly heard use is ご注意ください (go-chūi-kudasai, 'please be careful') (Chinese verb), which is used pervasively in recorded announcement in Japan (escalators, trains and subways, turning trucks), but other verbs are also used frequently, such as お座りください (o-suwari-kudasai, 'please sit down') (Japanese verb).

The respectful prefix can also be used in honorific verbs, when speaking about a superior, in which case it is formed by o-, followed by the masu-stem, followed by -ni-naru (〜になる) (suitably conjugated), as in お帰りになりました (o-kaeri-ni-narimashita, 'went home').

=== Female names ===
O- was also commonly used as an honorific prefix to female given names in pre-war Japan, particularly in combination with dropping common suffixes such as -ko (-こ) (-子, literally "child"). For example, Hanako (花子) would be referred to as O-hana (お花), Harumi (春美) would become O-haru (お春), Yuki (雪) would become O-yuki (お雪), and so on. This was a less polite honorific than -san. For example, a female servant named Kikuko would be referred to as O-kiku rather than Kikuko-san. This usage has disappeared in current Japanese, and has been replaced by using the diminutive suffix -chan instead (compare to male -kun), as in Aki-chan for Akiko.

=== Rare forms ===
There is also a rarer prefix mi- (kun'yomi), which is mostly used in words related to gods and the emperor, such as mi-koshi (御輿, 'portable shrine'; in Shinto) and mi-na (御名, 'the Holy Name'; in Christianity). However, in this context it is often replaced by 神 ('god'; also pronounced mi-), and then a further 御 (pronounced お- (o-)) may be added, as in 御神輿 (o-mi-koshi). Sometimes the reading is ambiguous—for example, 御霊屋 ('mausoleum') may be pronounced either mi-tama-ya or o-tama-ya. When pronounced as mi-, the prefix is usually written in kanji (unlike o- and go-, which are very frequently hiragana), but in some case it is written in hiragana, with a notable example being 御仏 (mi-hotoke, 'Lord Buddha') often being written as み仏, partly to avoid confusion with the incorrect reading *go-butsu.

The honorific prefix generally does not fall in the middle. In compounds, where the honorific would fall in the middle, the honorific is almost always dropped. For example, お茶／御茶 (o-cha, 'tea'), but 麦茶 (mugi-cha, 'barley tea'), not ×麦お茶／麦御茶 (*mugi-o-cha). There are exceptions, however, such as 乾御門 (inui-go-mon, 'northwest gate (to the imperial palace)'); note that 乾門 (inui-mon, 'northwest gate (generally)') is also used. Other notable exceptions include the words 朝ご飯 (asa go-han, 'breakfast'), 昼ご飯 (hiru go-han, 'lunch'), and 晩ご飯 (ban go-han, 'dinner').

Rarely, 御 is used instead as an honorific suffix on words for people, as in 親御 (oyago, '(your) parents') and 母御 (hahago, '(your) mother').

The character 御 has other readings, notably on (kun'yomi) and gyo (on'yomi), as seen in 'your company' (御社, on-sha; literally 'honorable company') and 'imperial garden' (御苑, gyo-en; literally 'honorable garden'), but these are not productive (they are not used to form new words, but only in existing words).

Another prefix, pronounced o- (お〜) and potentially confused with 御〜 when written in hiragana, is 阿〜 (o-), which also has affectionate connotations, but is a separate term and not productive. It was previously used for endearment for women's names, and today is most notable in 阿多福／阿亀 (o-ta-fuku, o-kame, 'moon-faced woman, homely woman'), which are frequently written as お多福／お亀, which may be mistaken (partially) for hiragana forms of ×御多福／×御亀. The character 阿 is more frequently pronounced a, and used especially in words and names from Sanskrit, such as the a in the syllable "aum", hence unfamiliar in this use, creating the potential for confusion.

In one case, a triple honorific prefix may used, namely in the word o-mi-o-tsuke, a polite term for miso soup, which is ordinarily referred to as miso-shiru (味噌汁). This may be spelt in kanji in multiple ways, including 御御御汁 ('honorable-honorable-honorable soup'), but also as 御味御汁 ('honorable flavor honorable soup') (味 = mi, 'flavor'), and the 御御御〜 spelling may be considered ateji, punning on 御 and 味 both having the reading mi.

== Manual keigo ==
Some convenience stores and fast-food restaurants teach their young and part-time employees to verbally interact with customers in strictly prescribed ways laid down in instruction manuals. These forms of speech are known as マニュアル敬語 (manyuaru keigo, "manual keigo") or バイト敬語 (baito keigo, "part-timer keigo"). Manual keigo includes forms which would be considered incorrect or at least non-standard in terms of traditional usage (keigo and otherwise). A common example is udon ni narimasu (literally "[this] becomes udon", "[this] will be udon") as a polite form of udon desu ("[this] is udon"), instead of the standard udon de gozaimasu ("[this] is udon (polite)")—this manual keigo form is often criticized on the basis that the udon is not "becoming" anything, and therefore ni naru is incorrect, both as keigo and more generally.

== Theories ==
Some scholars argue that while honorific usage is necessarily affected by culturally specific values systems, the linguistic principles regulating its usage are not necessarily distinct from those of other languages, including languages with fewer formalized honorifics, such as English.

=== Universal Politeness Theory ===
One theory to explain the usage of honorific language in Japan as it exists nowadays is the Universal Politeness Theory proposed by Brown and Levinson that argues that every member of society has a face. This face is defined as the public image and to protect that face they use a politeness strategy in order to reduce the chance of "losing face". More specifically, there are two type of faces, a positive and a negative one. The negative face is connected to an individual's territory and resources. On the other hand, the positive face is constituted by the desire to be valued within society by its members. The use of honorifics is a negative politeness strategy to protect one's face and is calculated with the factors of the social distance between the hearer and the speaker, measure of power that the hearer has over the speaker and the ranking of impositions within a specific culture.

==== Fukada's and Asato's Arguments for Universal Politeness Theory ====
Fukada and Asato stress the significance of power and distance as two variables that should be considered when evaluating Japanese politeness as Japan is a vertical society. On the basis of this, they utilise honorifics in order to not sound presumptuous or rude which could end up embarrassing themselves, losing face as a result, or threaten the hearer's face. A person in higher position asking something of a person with lower status will use strong honorifics as well because of the high rank of imposition. This shows that not just social values determine honorifics. Another factor is also the distance between people in a conversation that can trigger polite language for example in official meetings and such. In conclusion they add that these arguments support the social norm that being reserved and not speaking too much in front of people with higher status is considered a good trait in Japan. It is not just about using honorifics but also the amount the speaker talks to a hearer with a higher position. Just the act of speaking to such a person is an intrinsic face threat to the speaker.

=== Honorifics as Relation-Acknowledging Devices ===
Matsumoto criticised the Universal Politeness Theory and emphasises the sensitivity of the usage of honorifics in Japanese. She defines honorifics as relation-acknowledging devices that take the hierarchical position of the participants in a conversation more into account. She argues against honorifics as a strategy to preserve the negative face as the Japanese polite language system places emphasis on showing human relationships rather than minimising imposition (as one of the key factors in the Universal Politeness Theory). Matsumoto compared indirectness in both English and Japanese, concluding that Japanese sentences do not carry the sense of politeness that exists in English with indirectness. However, Fukada and Asato comment that Matsumoto only shows examples which only show the lack of convertibility of English expressions of request into Japanese and do not universally prove that Japanese indirect utterances are not considered polite and do not count as a negative politeness strategy to save face.

=== Volitional Type and Discernment Type of Politeness ===
Ide argues that there are two types of linguistic politeness in Japanese. One is the volitional type which is controlled by the speaker's intention how polite they want to be in a conversation. The other one is the discernment type that is controlled by one's assessment of the appropriate level of politeness within certain social norms. The usage of discernment encode the speaker's perception of communication in a situation. Factors like status difference of the speaker and hearer, speaker's role in the conversation and so on. She criticises that verbal and linguistic forms are treated the same way in the Universal Politeness Theory and that linguistic forms are determined and employed by social norms and not the desire of a speaker to save face. Another reason why these two forms should be differentiated is that verbal strategies are only oriented for the hearer while linguistic forms are used for both the speaker and the hearer. In this theory Fukada and Asato add that while Ide says verbal strategies are used for face-saving purposes of the speaker, it can also save the face of speaker and hearer.

== Anti-honorifics ==
Around 1900, Japanese grammarians characterized honorifics as being part of a wider system 待遇表現 taigū hyougen, "expressions indicating the way you treat people," which included not only polite or respectful language but also disparaging or pejorative terms and verb suffixes. In 1974, Neustupny pointed out that the rougher terms could also be used to convey familiarity or friendship. Toshiki Tsujimura dubbed the pejorative or familiar strata 非敬語 hikeigo "anti-honorifics,". Some Japanese grammarians divide the whole sphere into "plus" (honorific/polite/humble) and "minus" (familiar or pejorative) groupings. The anti-honorific/minus level can involve using different more slangy words, for example, やる yaru meaning "do" or "give" in place of the plain level する suru for "do," or あげる ageru for "give." The casual verb yaru might be used when giving something to a small child or a dog for instance. 食う kuu is a casual word for 食べる taberu ("eat"). Some of these words have a pejorative bite to them, eg. やらかす yarakasu for "do," or こく koku for "say." -やがる yagaru is a verb suffix that can turn any verb into a pejorative, eg. しやがる shiyagaru "(this guy) up and does (something)" or 来やがる kiyagaru "(this dweeb) pops up out of nowhere." Pronouns also have casual and pejorative levels, eg. the word 君 kimi is the plain form for "you." お前 omae is more casual, while 手前 temae or 貴様 kisama are pejorative. Instead of the plain 彼 kare "he" or この人 kono hito "this person", one can say more roughly こいつ koitsu "this guy (right here)," そいつ soitsu "that guy (over by you)" or あいつ aitsu "that guy (far away)."

== See also ==
- Aizuchi (相槌 aizuchi)
- Japanese grammar
- Japanese language
- Japanese names
- Japanese pronouns
- Korean honorifics
- Honorifics (linguistics)
- Thai honorifics
- Japanese etiquette
