= Kneeling =

Human position where one or both knees touch the ground

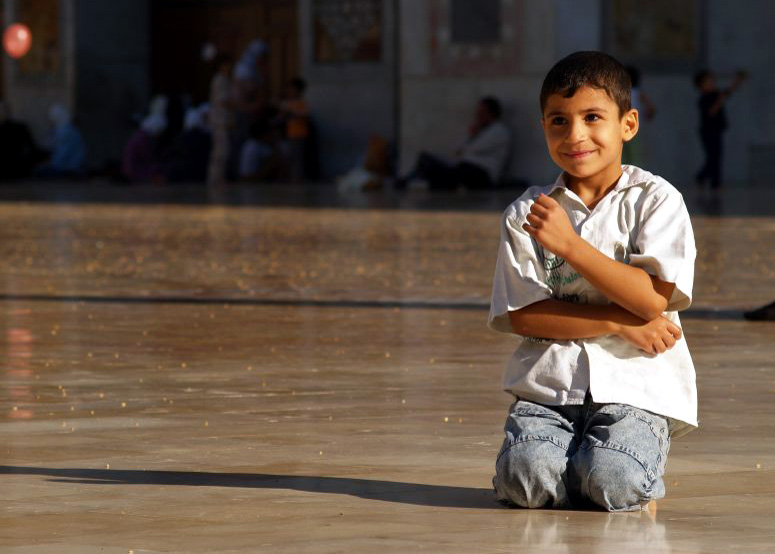
A boy kneeling in the courtyard of the Umayyad Mosque in Syria

Kneeling is a basic human position where one or both knees touch the ground. According to Merriam-Webster, kneeling is defined as "to position the body so that one or both knees rest on the floor". Kneeling with only one knee, and not both, is called genuflection.

Kneeling is also a primate behavior used to convey deference by making the figure that is kneeling appear smaller than the other. Primates themselves establish a dominance hierarchy (or "pecking order") which is important to the survival and behavior of the group. Chimpanzees, for example, have a complex social group that involves a dominant male and a corresponding female, to whom the other males and the juvenile chimps are submissive. Males who threaten the hierarchy are often severely injured or killed; in some instances, the use of submissive behavior is necessary to ensure survival.

== Religion ==
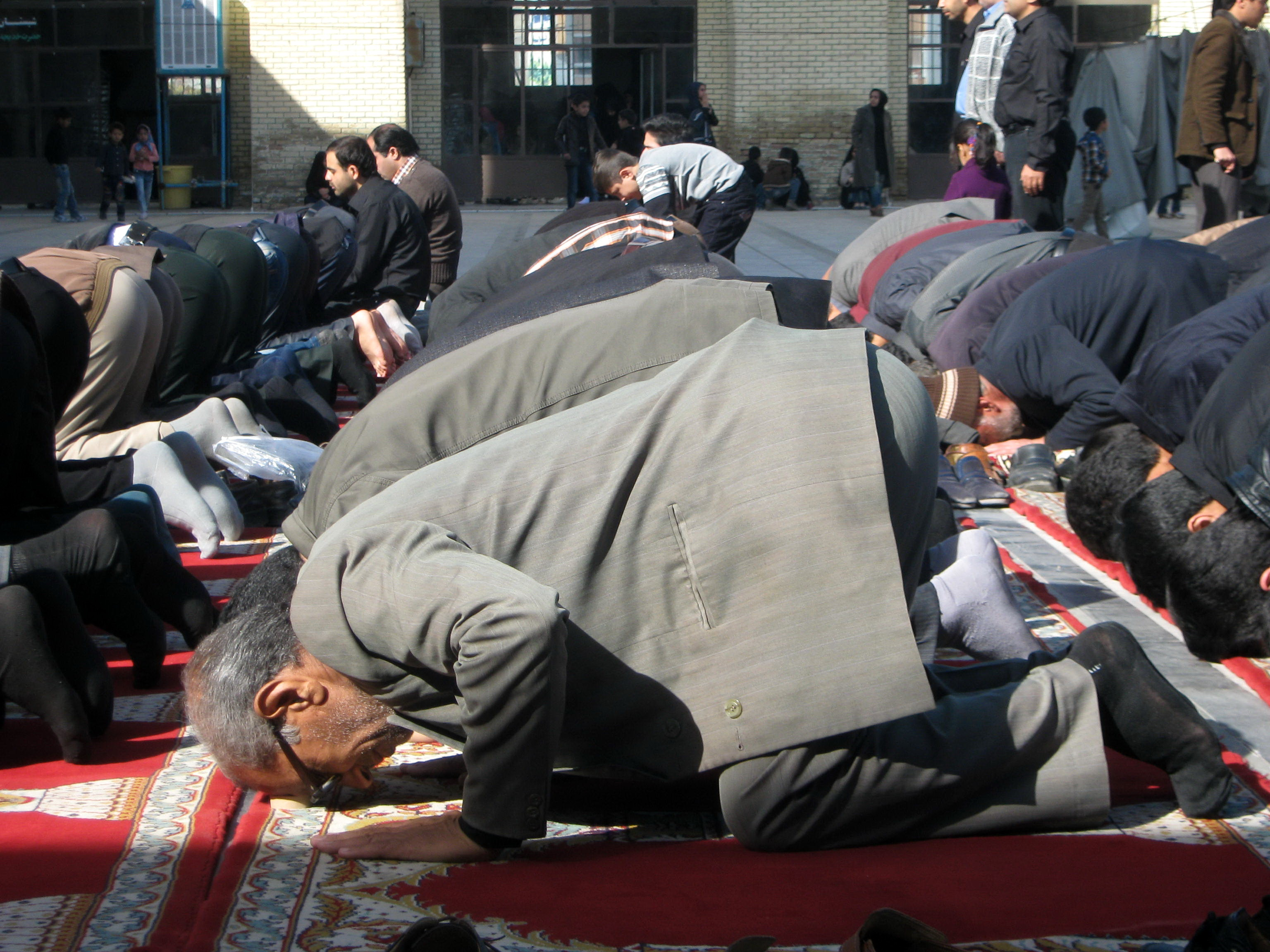
Worshippers kneeling (sujud-style) to pray

Humans have inherited the custom of entering a submissive frame of mind, and kneeling has become prevalent in religious practices. It has been used as a form of prayer and a way to worship God or revere deities and supernatural entities. Kneeling has taken on many different forms and styles as different cultures and institutions have adopted it.

=== Judaism and Islam ===
Kneeling is one way of praying in both Judaism and Islam, however, the more prevalent way to pray in Judaism is to stand up and perform the Amidah. Kneeling in Judaism is saved for specific kneeling stones which have become obsolete. Both faiths also perform a type of kneeling prostration that involves the entire body including the head, Qidah in Hebrew, and Sajdah in Arabic. This involves getting down on both knees and extending your hands on the ground until your forehead is up against the ground as well. Sometimes the disciples go so far as to lay down completely on the floor instead of just kneeling. In Islam, kneeling or prostrating (sujud) is usually performed on a dedicated prayer rug which is treated with especial care. Though common for Islam, there is also a prayer rug in Judaism in conjunction with the holiday of Yom Kippur (Day of Atonement). This holiday is one of the few times in Judaism in which it is customary to pray while kneeling on the rug.

=== Christianity ===
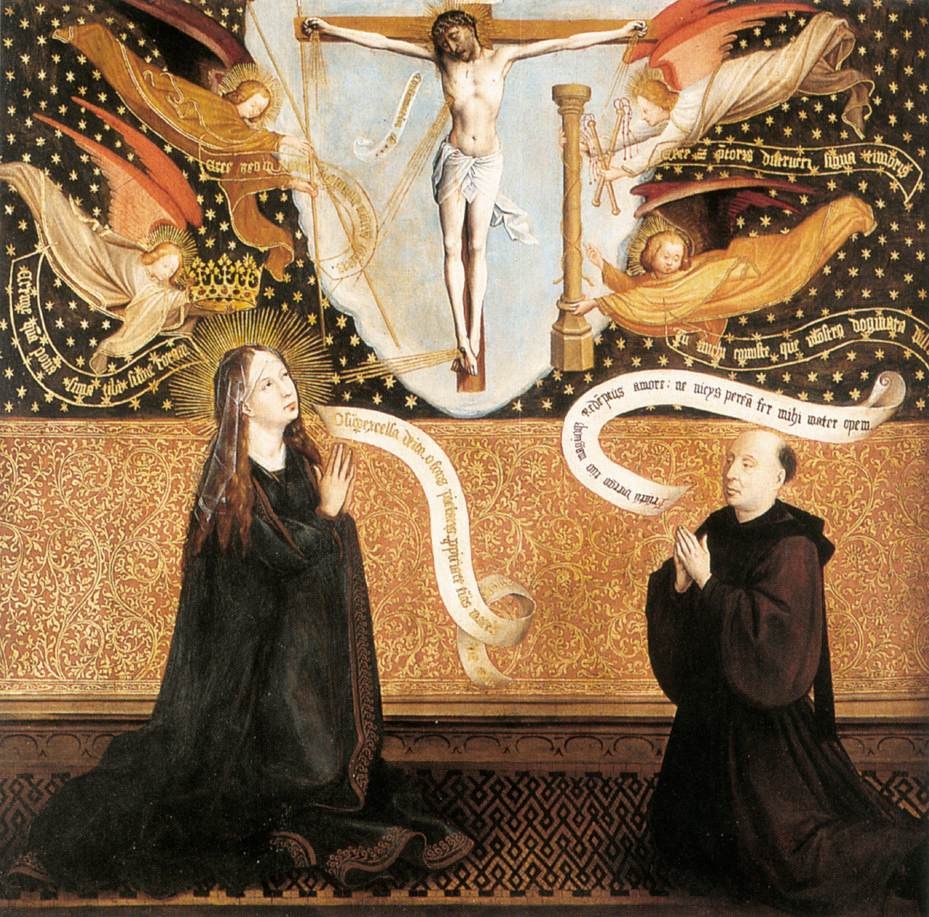
Kneeling in prayer is traditional in Christianity

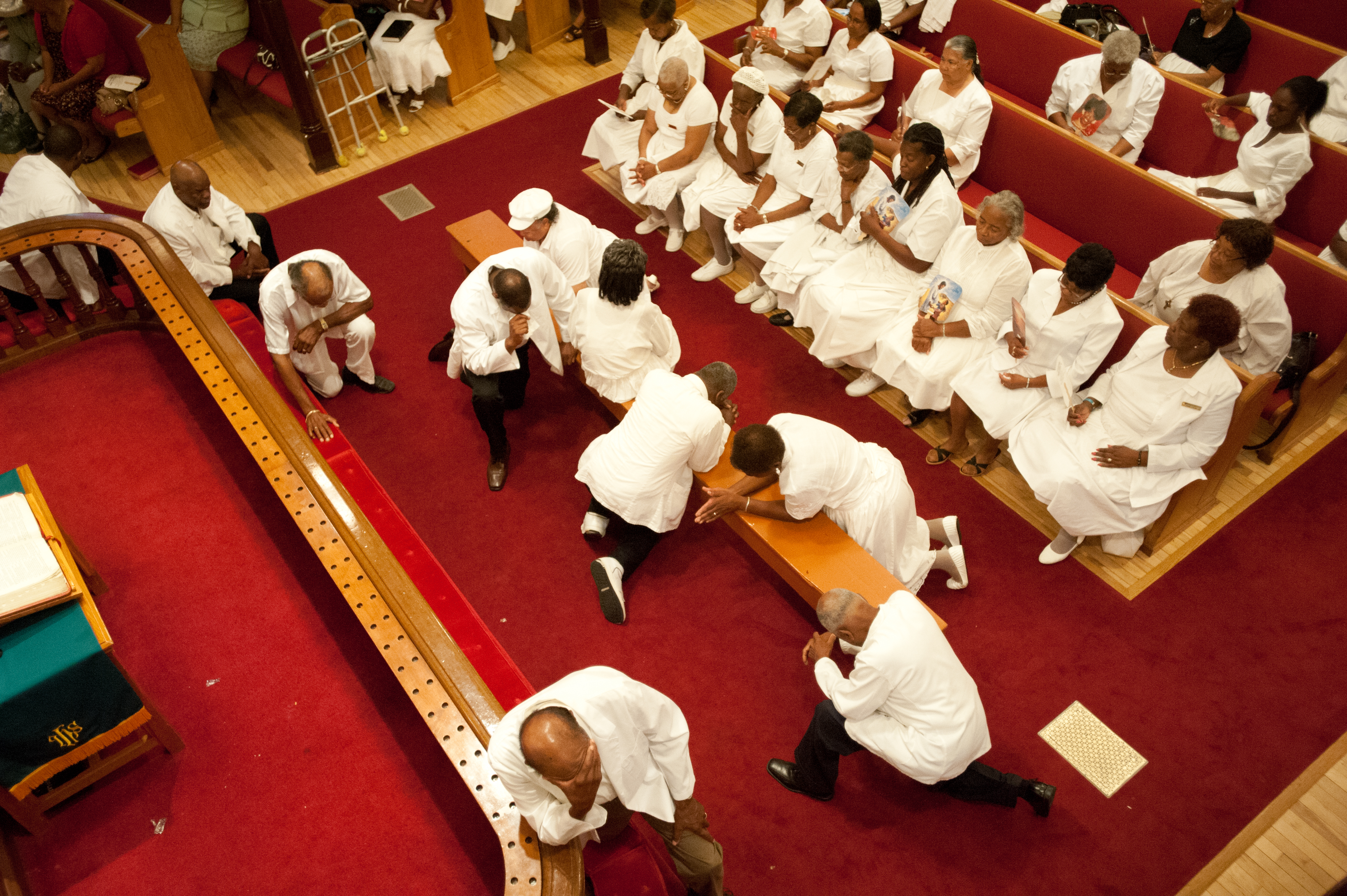
Christian worshipers at Mount Zion Methodist Church praying at the mourner's bench and chancel rails during an altar call (Pasadena, Maryland, U.S.)

The history of kneeling and prostration have always been a sign of prayer and worship in Christianity. It is mentioned in the New Testament that "whenever you pray, do not be like the hypocrites; for they love to stand and pray in the synagogues". The origin of this practice is within Sacred Scripture, which states: "Therefore God also highly exalted Him and gave Him the name that is above every name, so that at the name of Jesus every knee should bend, in heaven and on earth and under the earth" (NRSV). Some Christian churches, particularly those of the Roman Catholic and Evangelical-Lutheran traditions, have pews with kneelers. During the Liturgy of the Eucharist, Evangelical-Lutheran churches have a chancel rail at which the faithful kneel to receive Holy Communion. Certain parts of the church, such as where there is a votive candle rack, may have an individual kneeler known as a prie-dieu; the homes of Christians may have a prie-dieu as well for Bible reading and praying the breviary daily. In Christian churches of the Methodist and Baptist traditions, it is common for believers to kneel in their pews during a prayer led by the pastor (or a congregant) after prayer requests, praise reports and testimonies are shared. During altar calls in the Methodist tradition, congregants are invited to kneel at the chancel rails or mourner's bench to seek the New Birth (first work of grace), entire sanctification (second work of grace), or repent from backsliding.

== Marriage ==
=== Proposals ===
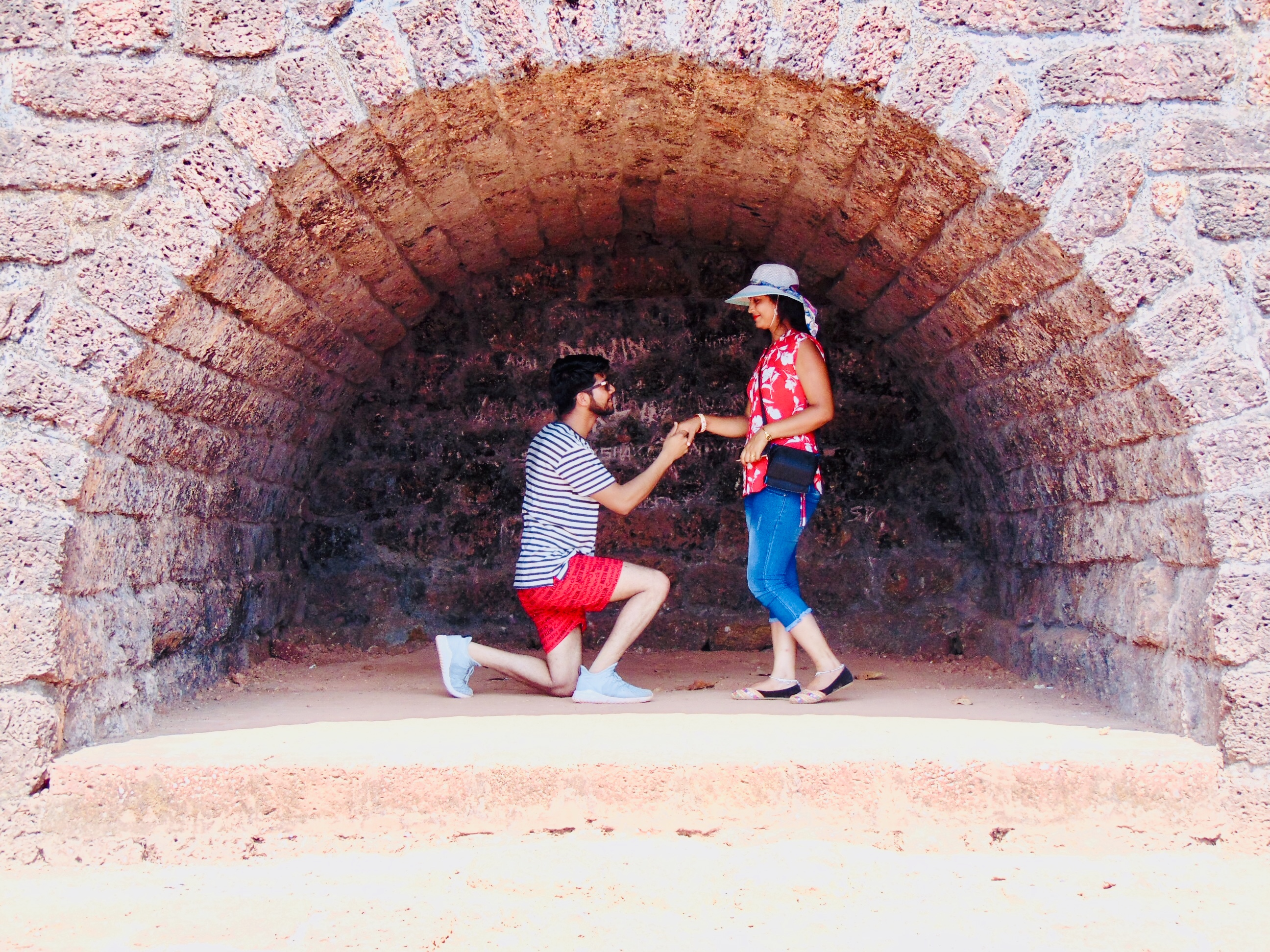
A man kneels during a marriage proposal.

Kneeling is the position often associated with traditional, Western marriage proposals. This position typically involves the person proposing kneeling with one knee on the ground, a position sometimes referred to as genuflecting, holding an engagement ring up to the person being proposed to. Kneeling in a public space in front of an apparent significant other often suggests a forthcoming proposal, and kneeling is indeed typically the expected position when proposing publicly.

While kneeling is considered a traditional style of proposing, there is little consensus on its historical origins, and it in fact appears to be a fairly modern custom. Connections have been made to kneeling in European feudal society, in which kneeling before a lord suggested servitude and surrender. Medieval imagery sometimes depicted a knight kneeling before a lady in an act of courtly love, suggesting kneeling as a form of romantic expression was similar to the submission given to lords. Kneeling during a marriage proposal has been suggested as a similar form of submission.

=== Christian wedding ceremonies ===
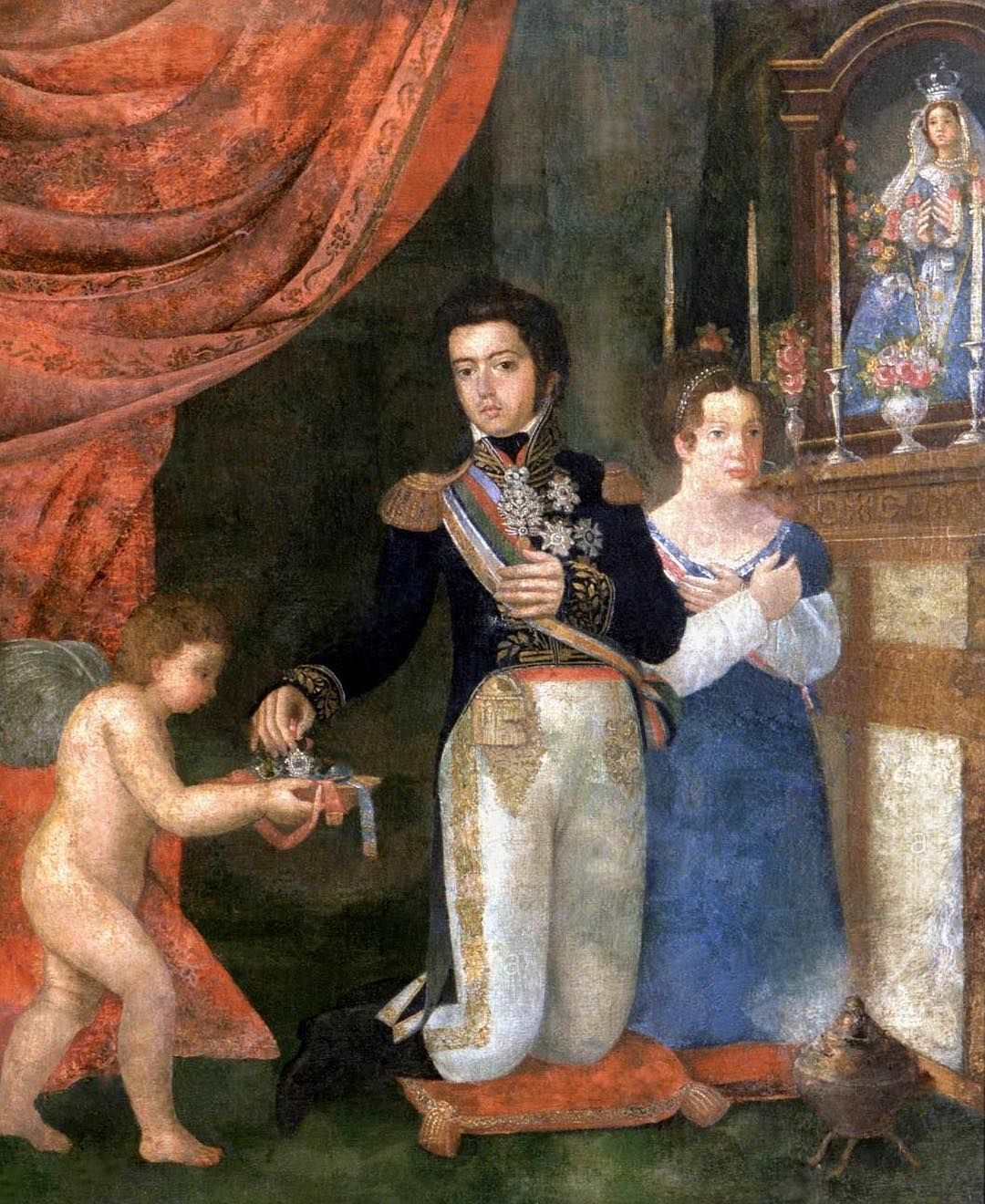
Allegory of the wedding of Pedro of Braganza to Maria Leopoldina of Habsburg-Lorraine, the Prince and Princess Royal of the United Kingdom of Portugal, Brazil and the Algarves, 1820

In Christian wedding ceremonies, especially those of the Roman Catholic, Lutheran and Anglican denominations, it is customary for the couple to kneel before the altar, following the Lord's Prayer. Catholic, Lutheran and Anglican wedding ceremonies are often conducted within a Mass, and as such the couple and wedding guests alike kneel at several points throughout the ceremony as the liturgy calls for it. Couples are sometimes given kneelers to rest on at the altar.

During the ceremony, the couple may participate in the customary placing of the veil or Lazo, a rope placed around the couple's shoulders, while they are kneeling with both knees on the ground as chosen sponsors place a veil over the head of the bride and the shoulders of the groom, or have the Lazo placed around them, in order to symbolize the binding of the marriage. Following the placement of the Lazo or veil, the couple remains in a kneeling position as the priest conducts the Nuptial Blessing.

== Kneeling in sexual intercourse ==
The kneeling position may be used in various ways in sexual intercourse. A member of a couple may take a kneeling position in front of their partner in order to perform oral sex for the other. Other sexual positions involving kneeling may include the position commonly referred to as “doggy style,” in which one partner is crouched on all fours while the other takes a kneeling position, usually with both knees on the ground, in order to penetrate the crouching partner from behind, or various riding positions, in which one partner is kneeling with both knees down above the other partner and is penetrated from below.

=== BDSM ===
BDSM, referring to bondage/discipline, dominance/submission and sadism/masochism, encompasses a complex variety of practices involving interpersonal relationships, typically of a sexual nature, centered around the creation of an unbalanced power dynamic. Consent is considered of the utmost importance within a BDSM relationship. Kneeling is commonplace in BDSM practices as a way to show or enforce submission to or by the dominant partner. The role of the dominant or the submissive is not exclusively gendered, though gender may influence the dynamics of a D/s relationship. Some men who serve as submissives to dominant women, for example, find comfort in the action of kneeling submissively for a woman.

== Kneeling in different cultural societies ==
=== East Asia ===
There are many forms of kneeling in East Asia presented within their daily lives and daily rituals. This is different from western culture and other religions since these daily rituals are not necessarily tied to their religion but instead more to their society and culture.

=== Japan ===
There are two forms of kneeling or prostration in Japanese culture: Dogeza and Seiza.

Dogeza is a traditional form of respectful bowing to acknowledge superiors. This practice is two steps: kneeling down onto the ground, then bending over to touch the ground with the head. It can also be to express apology or attempt to bless someone with your good favor. This practice is mainly a form of formal and deeply emotional apology to someone of a higher rank than you within society. This is more of an older form of reverence, though, that has fallen out of practice.

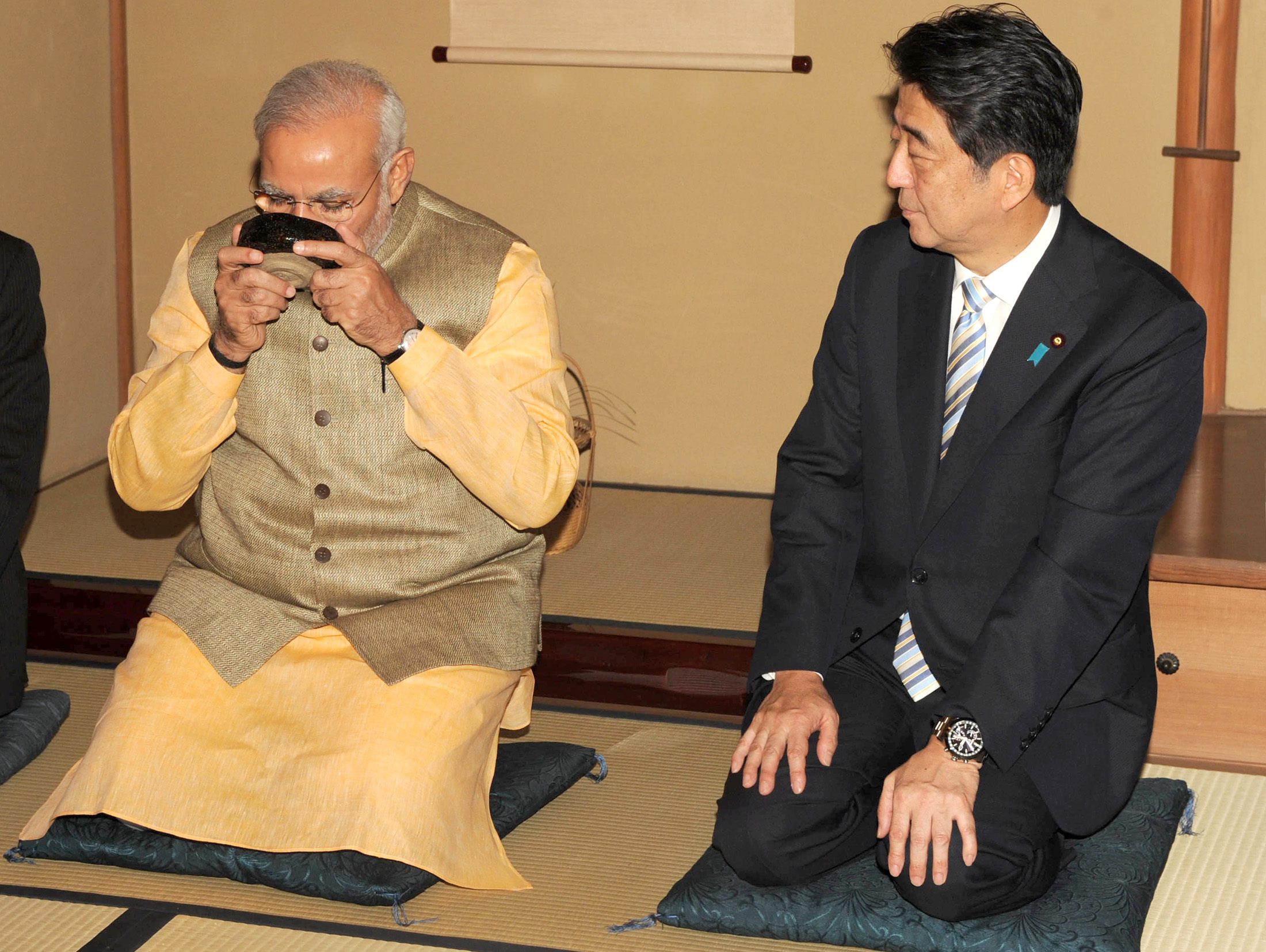
Narendra Modi and Shinzo Abe kneeling in the Japanese seiza manner

Seiza is another Japanese kneeling position that refers to the traditional way of sitting down in Japan. This is a formal way of sitting down which was adopted by Japan after the Edo period. Since then, it has now become the traditional way of sitting down within the household and for certain cultural events. Many of the culturally significant and traditional events in Japanese society involve sitting positions such as funerals or tea parties. This form of sitting however is uncomfortable to those who have not practiced it for a long time; therefore people in Japan usually start practicing this posture at quite a young age.

=== China ===
In China, there is a form of prostration involving kneeling called Kowtow. Kowtow is where the participant kneels down then subsequently bows on the ground so that their forehead touches the ground. This was a traditional way of showing respect in China. The literal translation of the mandarin word is “knock head”. This whole process consisted of three kneelings and nine knockings of the head, nine being important since it was a number associated with the Emperor. This practice of kowtowing is not new to the Chinese nor is the concept of kneeling since they sat kneeling down for much of their history as well.

=== Kneeling in Ancient China ===
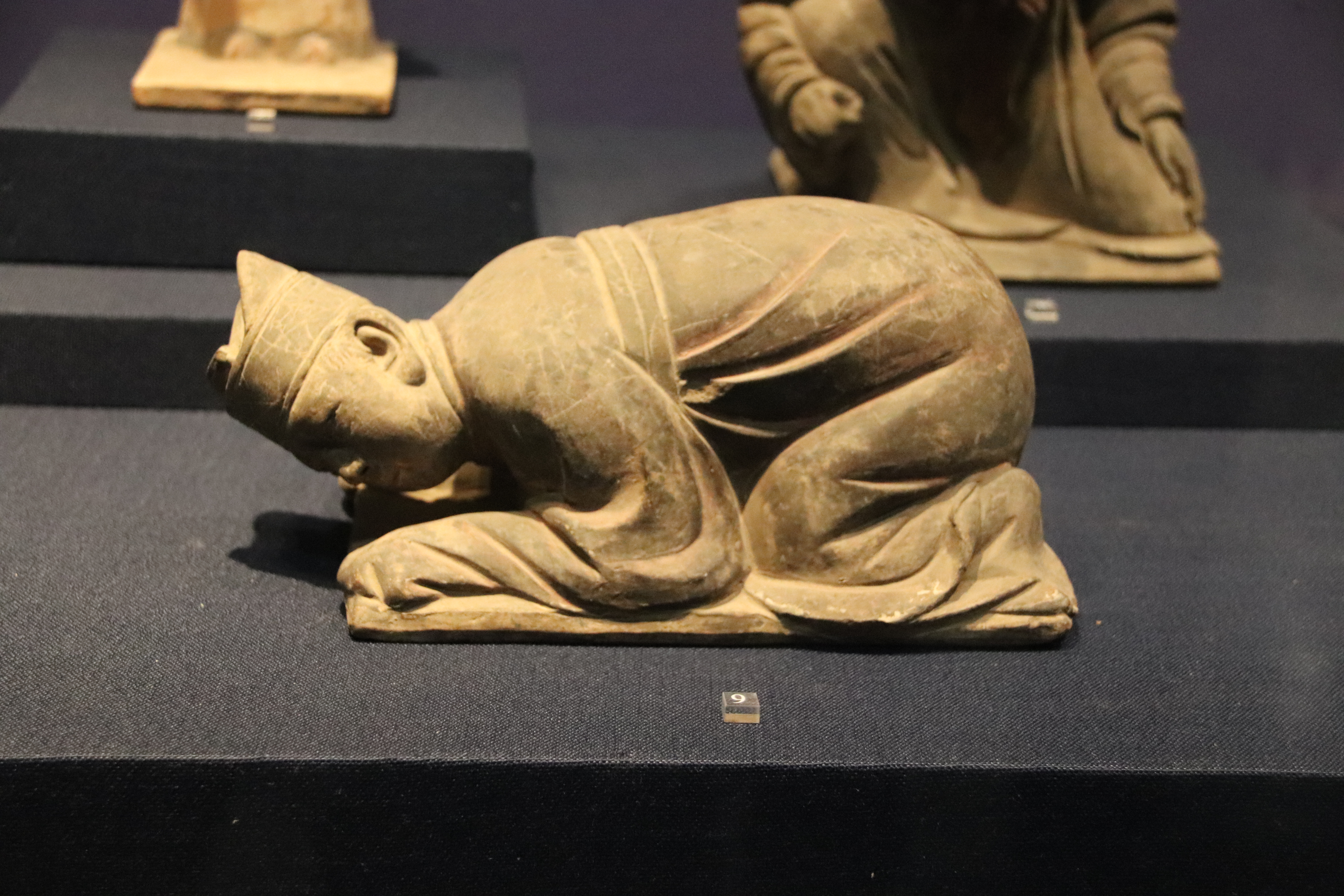
Statue of kowtowing official in the Shaanxi History Museum, China

In ancient Chinese society, kowtow, or kneeling-bowing, was common for students to express gratitude to their teachers. Before learning any skills or knowledge, students or apprentices had to kneel down and bow toward their teachers to show appreciation. The students first thank the teacher and then demonstrate their commitment to the apprenticeship. After the ritual, teachers will express their willingness to teach and impart knowledge as well as life wisdoms.

Besides students and teachers, kowtow was common among children and parents as well. The younger generation also performs kowtow toward their parents to show gratitude and appreciation. Although kneeling-bowing used to be seen as the highest expression of Confucianism for the master-apprentice and children-parents relationship, the behavior has caused controversies in the modern world.

=== Genderization of kneeling in Greek ritual ===
Kneeling can be a gendered behavior in Greek Ritual. In classical attic votive reliefs, almost all kneeling worshippers are females. The Greek literature also gives similar evidence. No male kneels in Greek tragedy, and in Greek comedy, only slaves kneel. In those literature, people kneel when they are in a horrible situation, and kneeling is therefore related to supplication for change. In most cases, kneeling is considered a ritual act of last resort that usually takes place in front of a statue of God. It is also seen as a sign of submission for those in victim positions. It turned out that in Greek ritual, kneeling is only appropriate for females or slaves.

=== Prehistoric Ecuador ===
Kneeling behaviors occurred in prehistoric Ecuador as well. Prehistoric skeletal samples from Coastal Ecuador suggest behaviors or squatting and kneeling. Bone evidence of metatarsophalangeal joints (between the metatarsal bones of the foot and the proximal bones) show that the articular surface of the head of the first metatarsal bones (located behind the big toe) is extended onto the upper side. On the ventral side, the edge of the articular area is lifted away from the shaft, or the midsection of the long bone. and is extended on the lateral side. All the bone evidence suggests a tendency of prolonged hyperdorsiflexion, or an increased use of muscles in the front part of the foot, which is associated with habitual kneeling posture. In addition, the flattening of the ventral surface on metatarsal implies pressure points related to kneeling.

== Health aspects of kneeling ==
In East Asian cultures such as Chinese, Japanese, Korean and Vietnamese, postures with high flexion including kneeling and squatting are used more often in daily activities, while in North America, people kneel or squat less frequently in daily activities, unless for occupational, religious, or leisure practices. The favored style of those high flexion postures also differs among ethnic groups. While Caucasians tend to flex the forefoot when kneeling or squatting, East Asians are more likely to keep the foot flat on the ground.

In the two common styles of kneeling, the plantarflexed kneel and the dorsiflexed kneel, the lead leg may experience higher adduction and flexion moment, which is associated with increased knee joint loads.

== Emotional expression ==
=== Grief ===
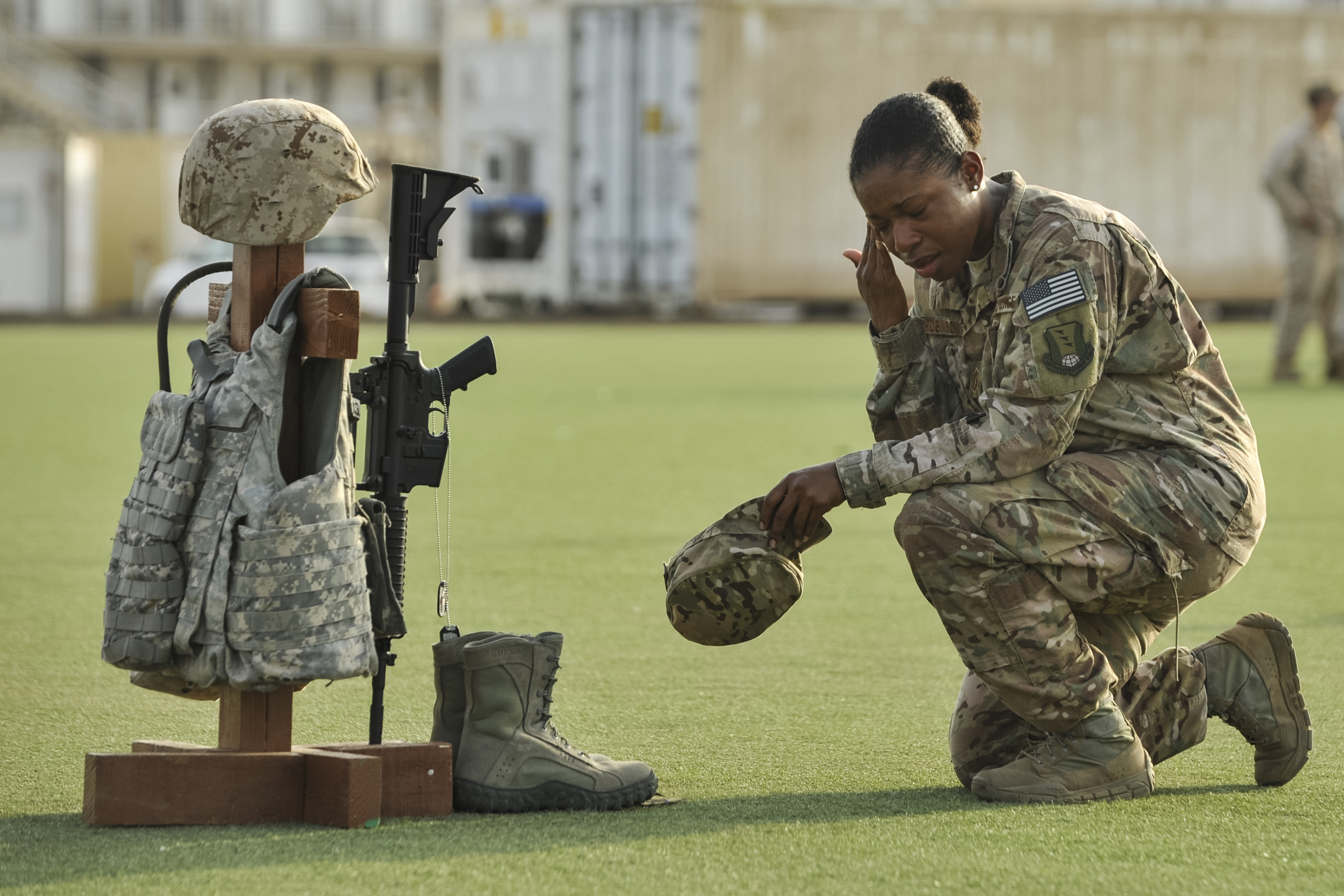
A U.S. Air Force Master Sargent kneels in front of a battlefield cross.

People may kneel in grief, for their own losses or for others.

In 1970, Willy Brandt, Chancellor of West Germany, visited Warsaw, Poland. After laying a wreath at the memorial to the 1943 Warsaw Ghetto Uprising, which had been brutally put down by the Nazi regime, he unexpectedly, and apparently spontaneously, fell to his knees for about half a minute, as a mark of humility and penance. The event is known in German as the Kniefall von Warschau (the Warsaw genuflection).

=== Requests ===
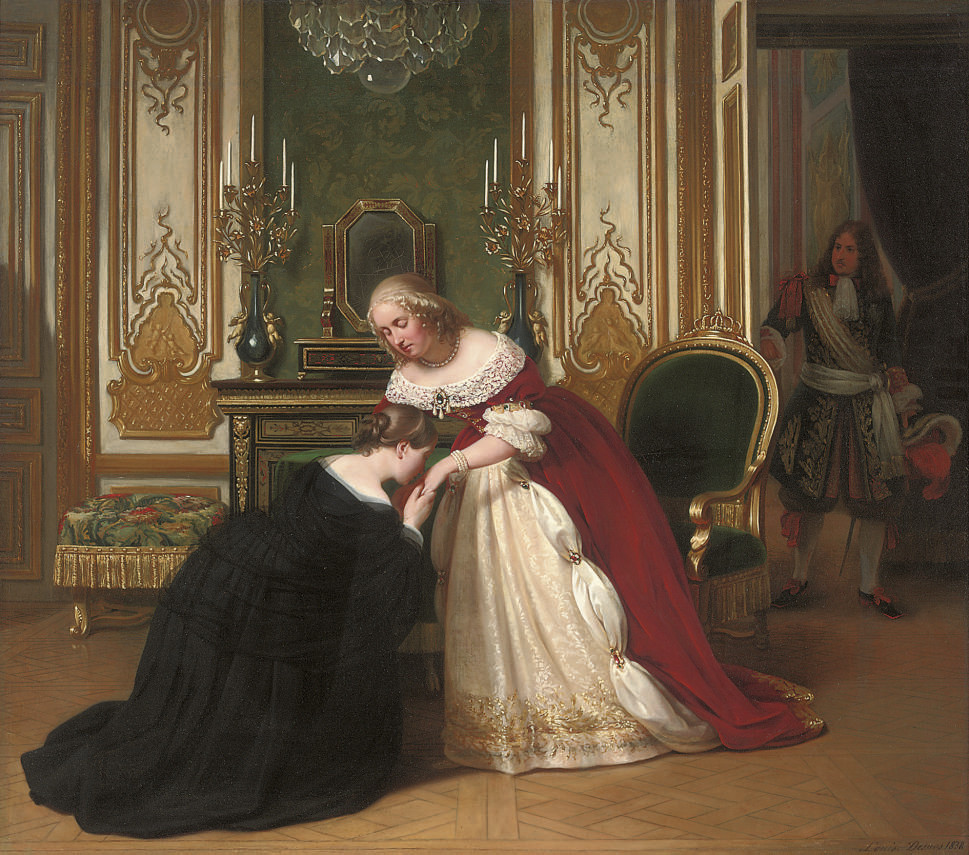
1838 French painting of a woman begging forgiveness from another.

Kneeling is also used when making emotional requests, such as asking for forgiveness.

== Monarchs ==
=== European knights since the Middle Ages ===
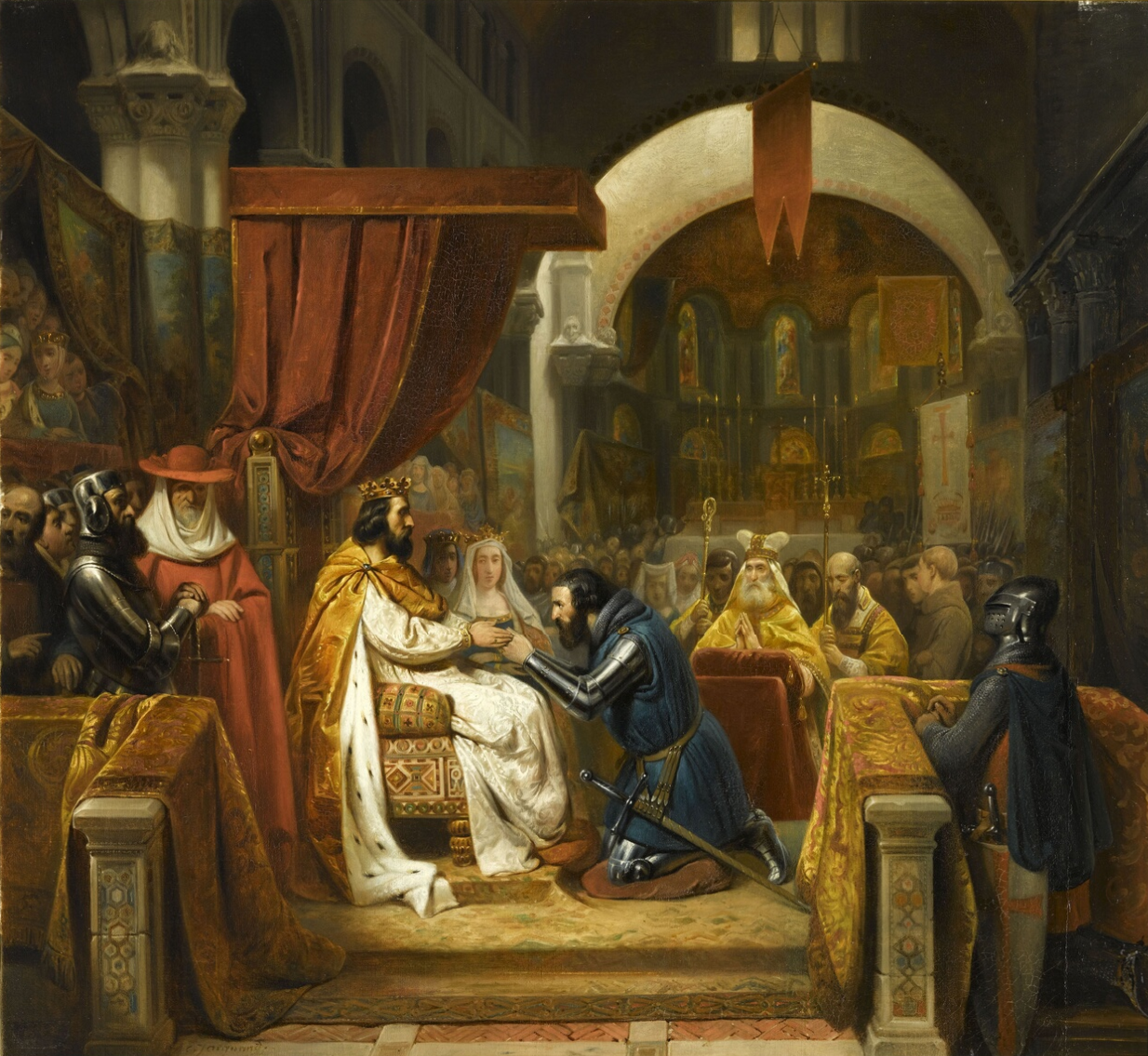
19th-century painting showing Henry, Count of Portugal kneeling before Alfonso VI of León and Castile in the 11th century

Kneeling is viewed as a sign of submission when it is performed in a royal setting. One of the most common royal settings in which kneeling takes place is when a person is being knighted. When knighthood began in Europe in the Middle Ages, only men could become knights; when this was changed to include women, the knighted women were made dames. At the ritual portion of a religious knighthood ceremony in the Middle Ages, the man that would later be knighted knelt before a chapel altar with a sword placed on it. During the accolade, the man would kneel or bow before a knight, lord, or king to be dubbed with the flat side of a sword or a hand.

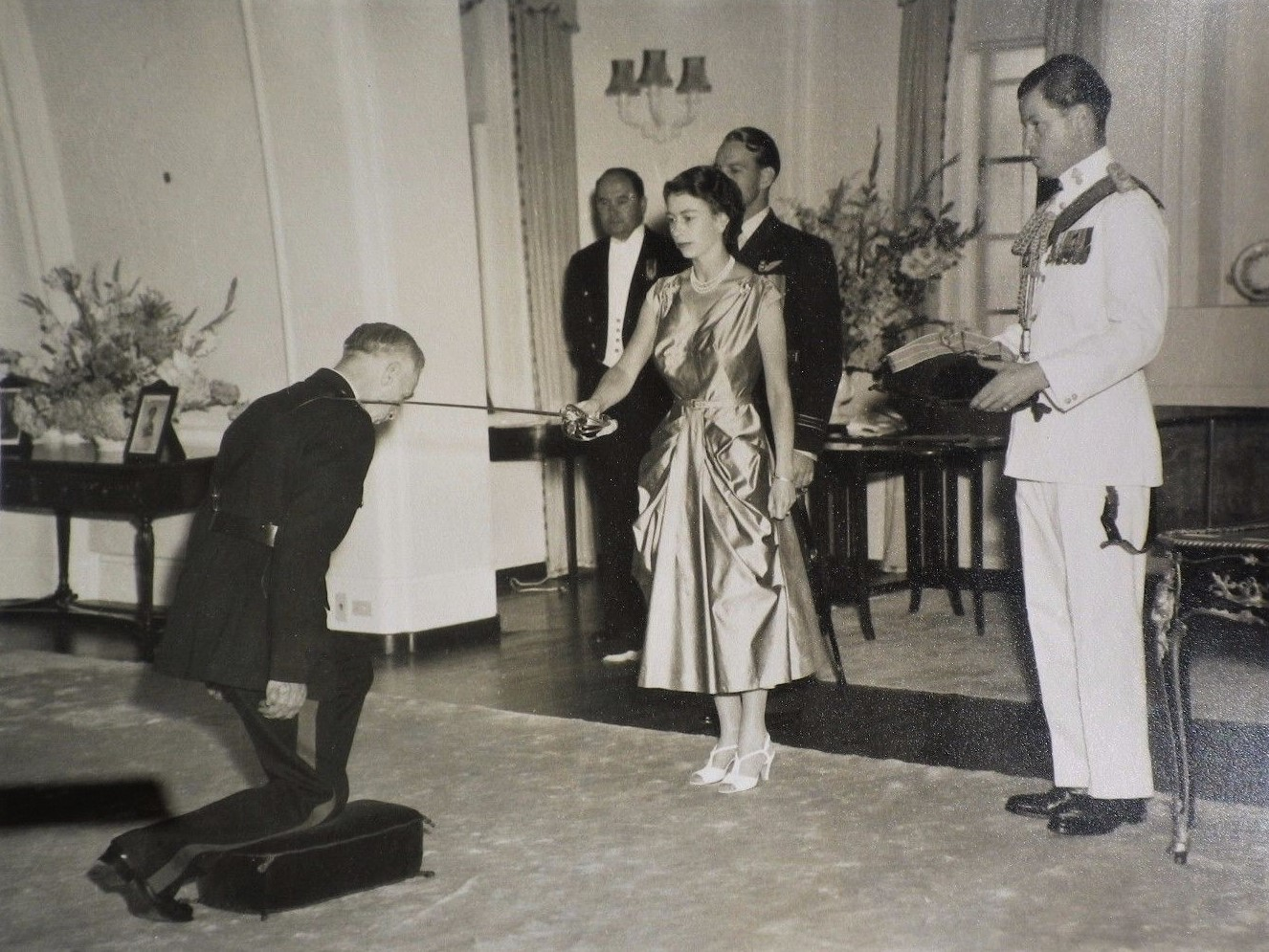
Sir Sydney Fairbairn Rowell being knighted by Queen Elizabeth II in 1953

The gesture of kneeling before royalty to receive a knighthood is a way of proclaiming the person's dedication to serving and honoring their country or the Church. However, knighting ceremonies are not as rigid and demanding as they once were in the Middle Ages. There have been a few changes to the aspect of kneeling that have made the ceremony accessible to a more diverse number of people. Knighting ceremonies now usually take place with the investiture, a special day when those that have been awarded with an honor from the Crown receive their award in person at a royal residence. Those that are present to be knighted are no longer required to take part in all of the expansive sections of the knighthood ceremony from the Middle Ages. One of the sections that has been waived is the need for the individual to kneel at a chapel altar with a sword placed on it. The person is still required to kneel before the monarch during the accolade in order to be dubbed, but they do so on an investiture stool.

While kneeling is seen as a sign of respect and humility in countries that have a monarch, it is not considered commonplace in countries where there is no monarch. Because of this cultural difference, kneeling is not required for individuals from these countries when they are knighted. For example, when General Herbert Norman Schwarzkopf Jr. received an honorary knighthood from Queen Elizabeth II in 1991, he was not expected to kneel to receive his knighthood because he was not a British subject. Other exceptions for kneeling before a monarch when being knighted are old age, physical inability, or health conditions.

=== Interacting with royalty ===
Kneeling is a sign of reverence and submission when done toward royalty upon meeting them.

During the reign of Queen Elizabeth I, she valued the bend of an individual's knee to her over a verbal commitment as an act of loyalty. Those that would comply, like one of her favorite courtiers Blanche Parry, would be rewarded with proximity to the Crown and other political gifts. However, the British Royal Family and the Royal Household at Buckingham Palace now no longer insist or require individuals to follow traditional codes of behavior when greeting a member of the Royal Family. They still accept people who wish to follow the traditional codes, but they understand if an individual is not comfortable with kneeling, amongst other gestures, in submission.

== As punishment ==
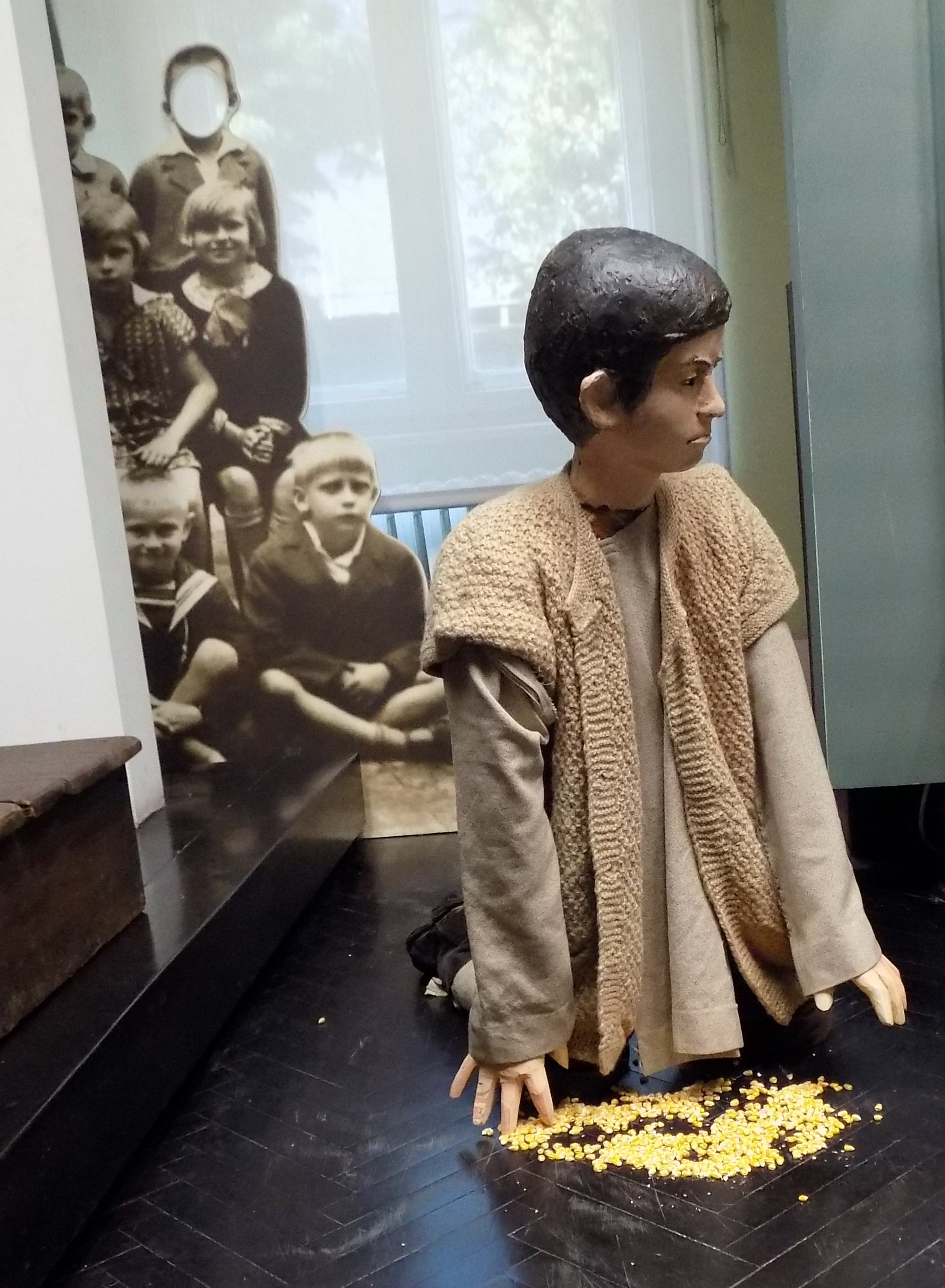
Kneeling on corn - the most common way of punishing students in schools in Serbia in the 19th century, an exhibit of the Pedagogical Museum in Belgrade

Forced kneeling as a punishment is a traditional form of physical discipline and public humiliation, especially used for child discipline in schools, religious institutions, and homes worldwide. A child may be forced to kneel in a corner or face a wall (a more severe form of time-out). Sometimes children were forced to kneel on uncooked rice, peas, dried corn, or rock salt. The pressure of body weight causes the sharp grains to dig into the skin, inflicting intense pain.

== Sports ==
Placing a single knee on the ground (taking a knee) may have different meanings in different sports and situations. In many sports, taking a knee is a sign of respect and solidarity when a player from either team, or an official, is injured such that they need or may need assistance to leave the playing area. In these cases, it is considered proper for all other players (but not the officials or any player assisting the injured person) to place one knee on the ground until the injured person is off the playing area.

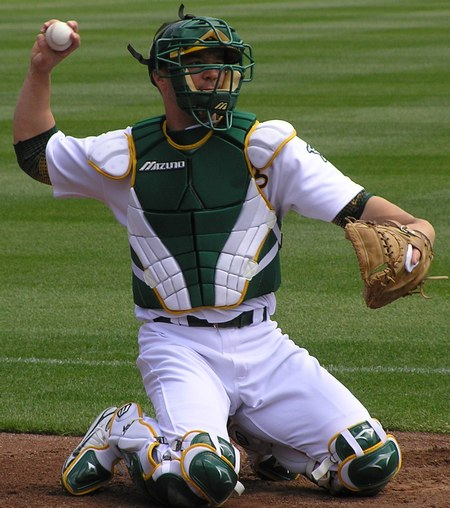
Baseball catcher kneeling

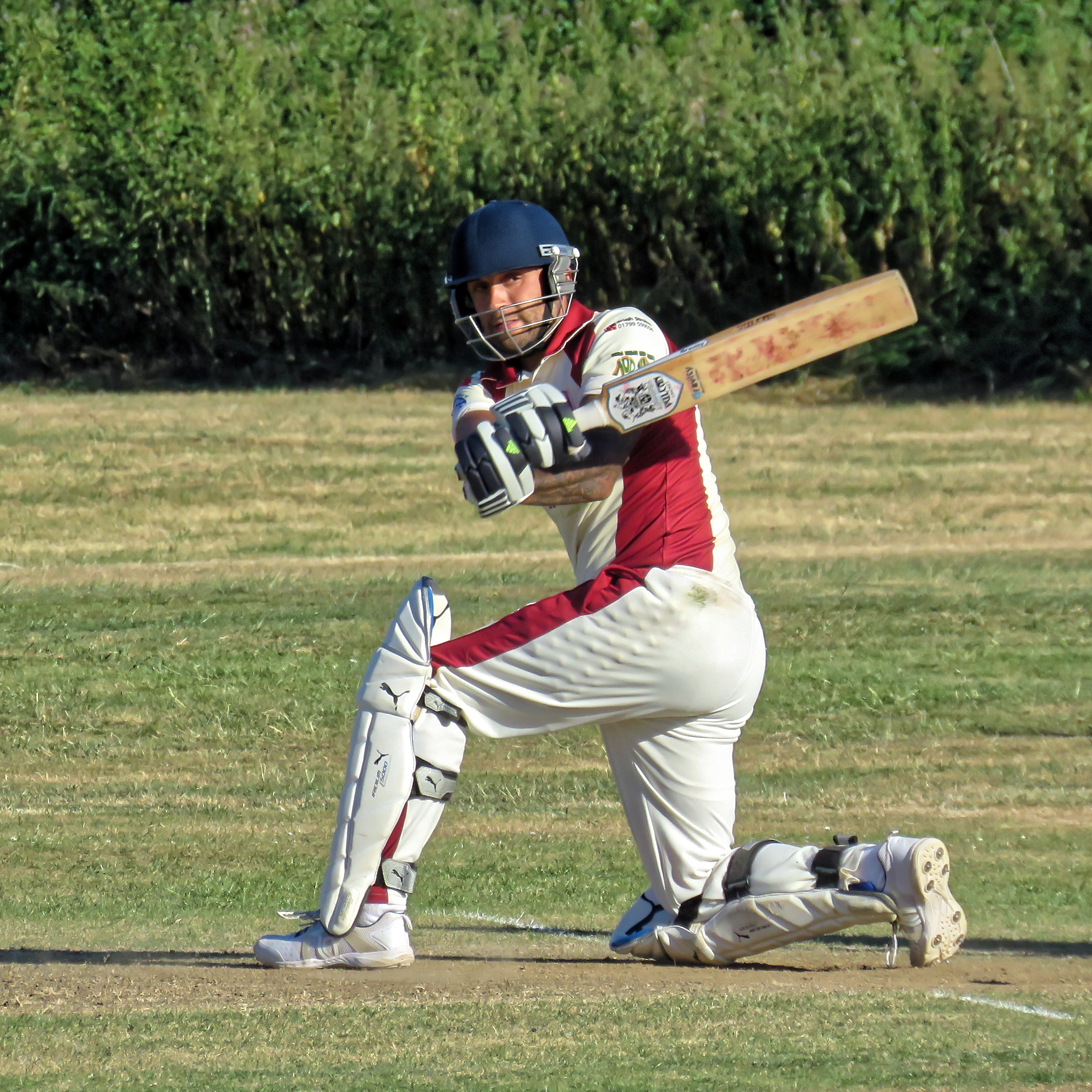
Kneeling cricketer

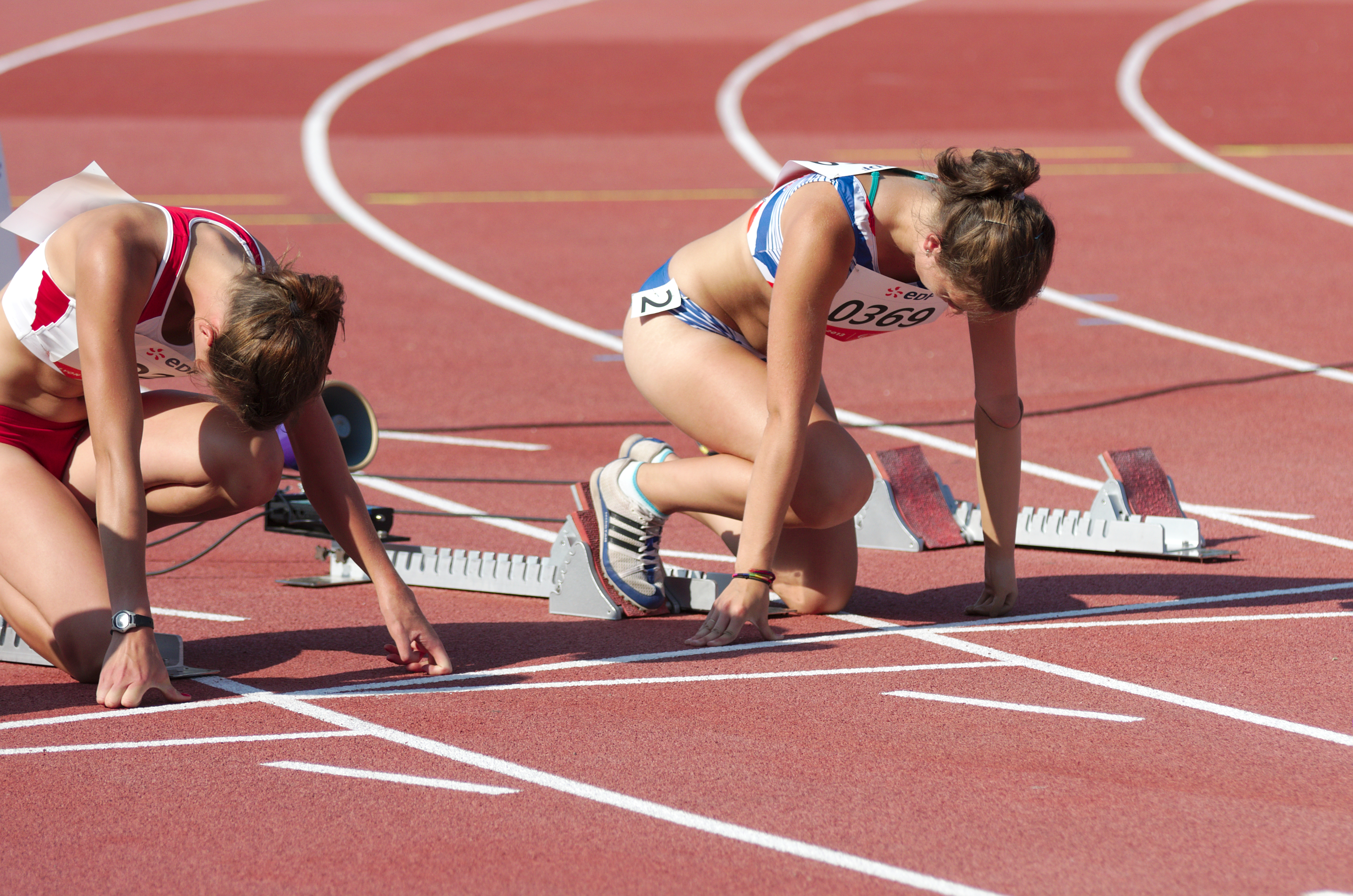
Athletes kneeling to prepare for a race

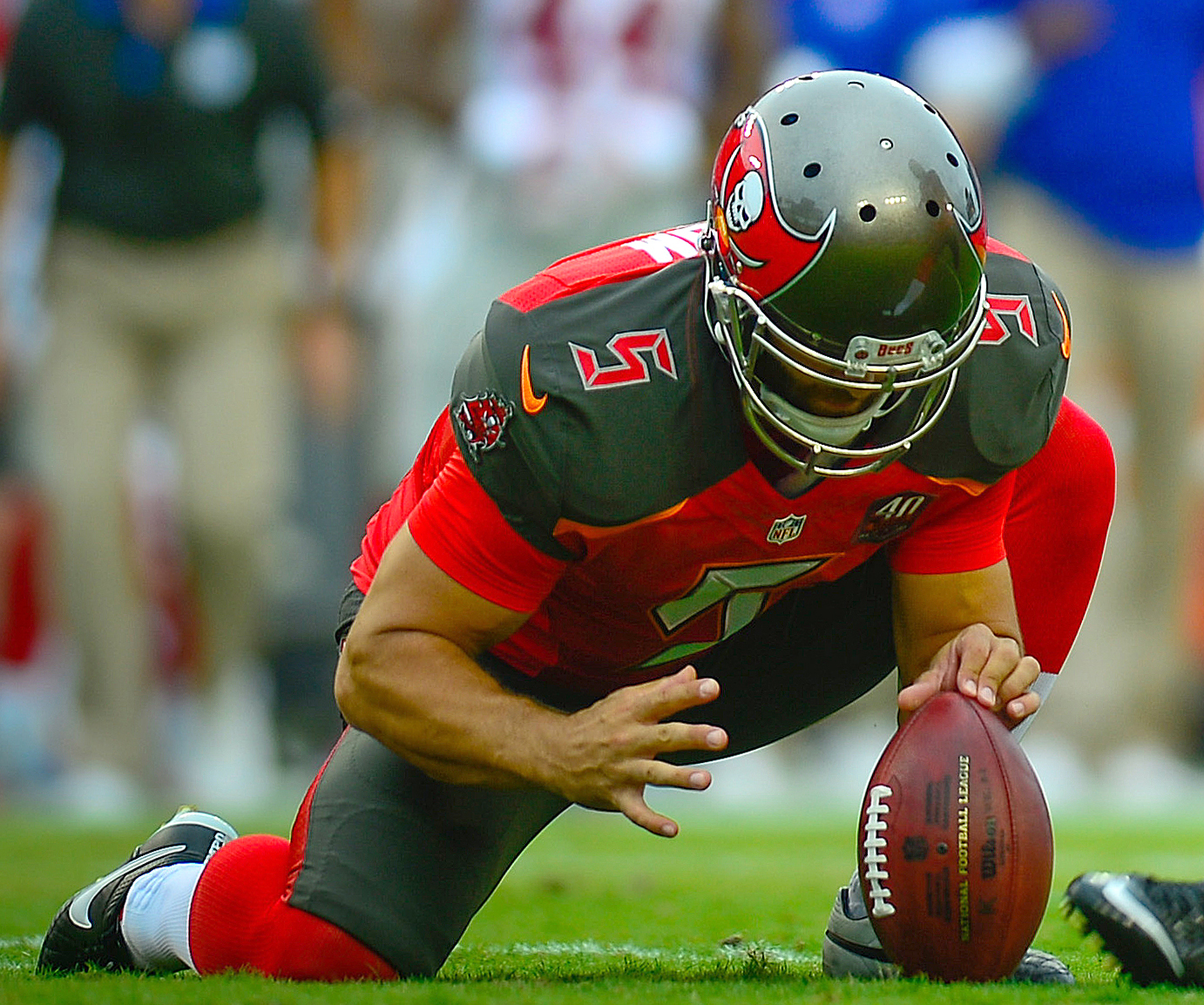
Kneeling to hold a football for the kicker

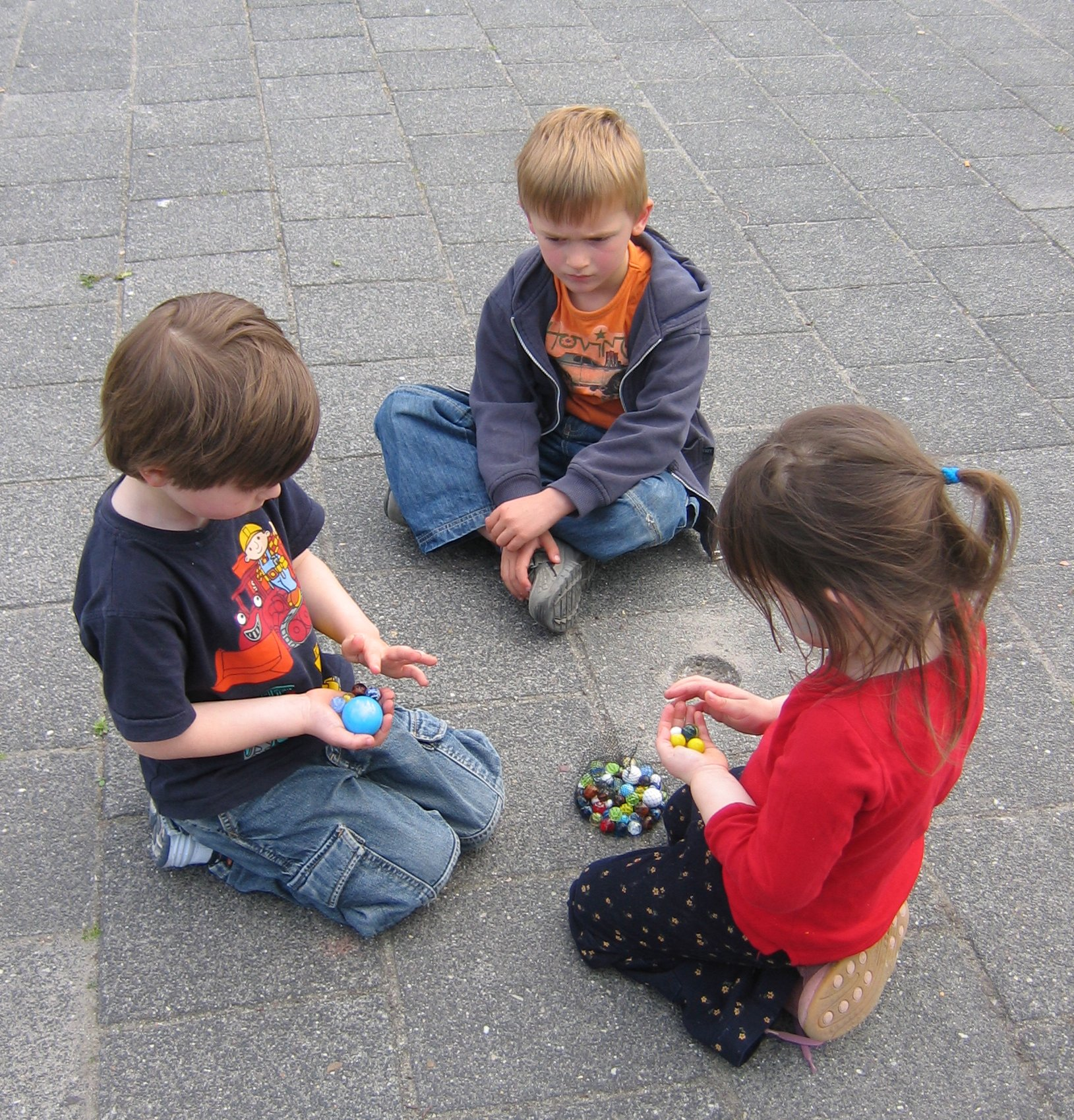
Children kneel to play marbles.

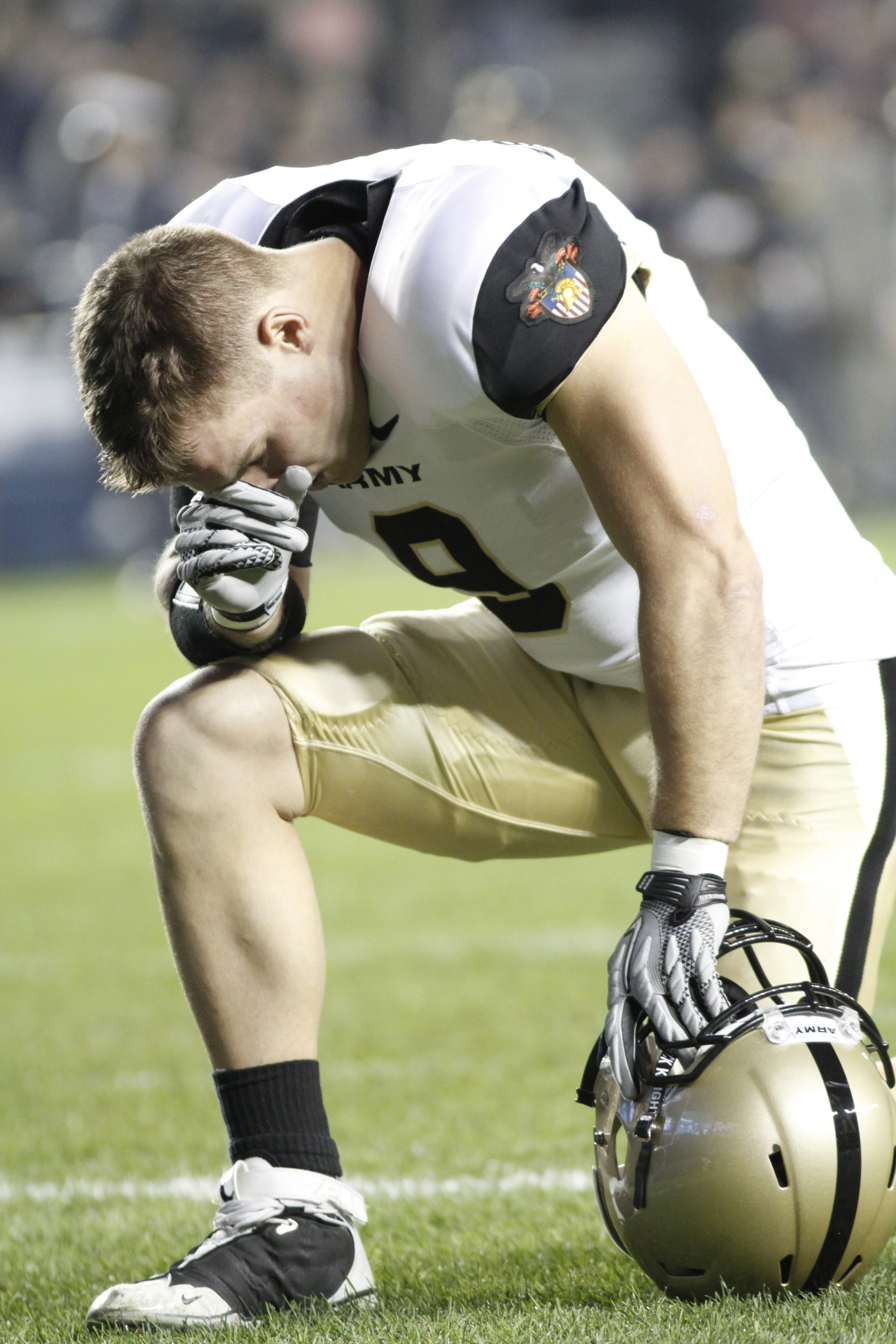
An American football player kneeling before the start of a game

=== American football and Canadian football ===
In American football and Canadian football, the quarterback kneel may be performed to quickly end a play and use up time on the clock with only a minimal penalty. This is particularly useful when the offensive team is ahead by a few points and does not want to risk a fumble or other turnover.

Also in American football and Canadian football, any player with the ball may take a knee to end a play or to indicate that they do not intend to advance further with the ball.

== See also ==
- Sitting in salah
- Kneeling chair
- Prayer mat
