= Tent revival =

Gathering of Evangelical Christian worshipers

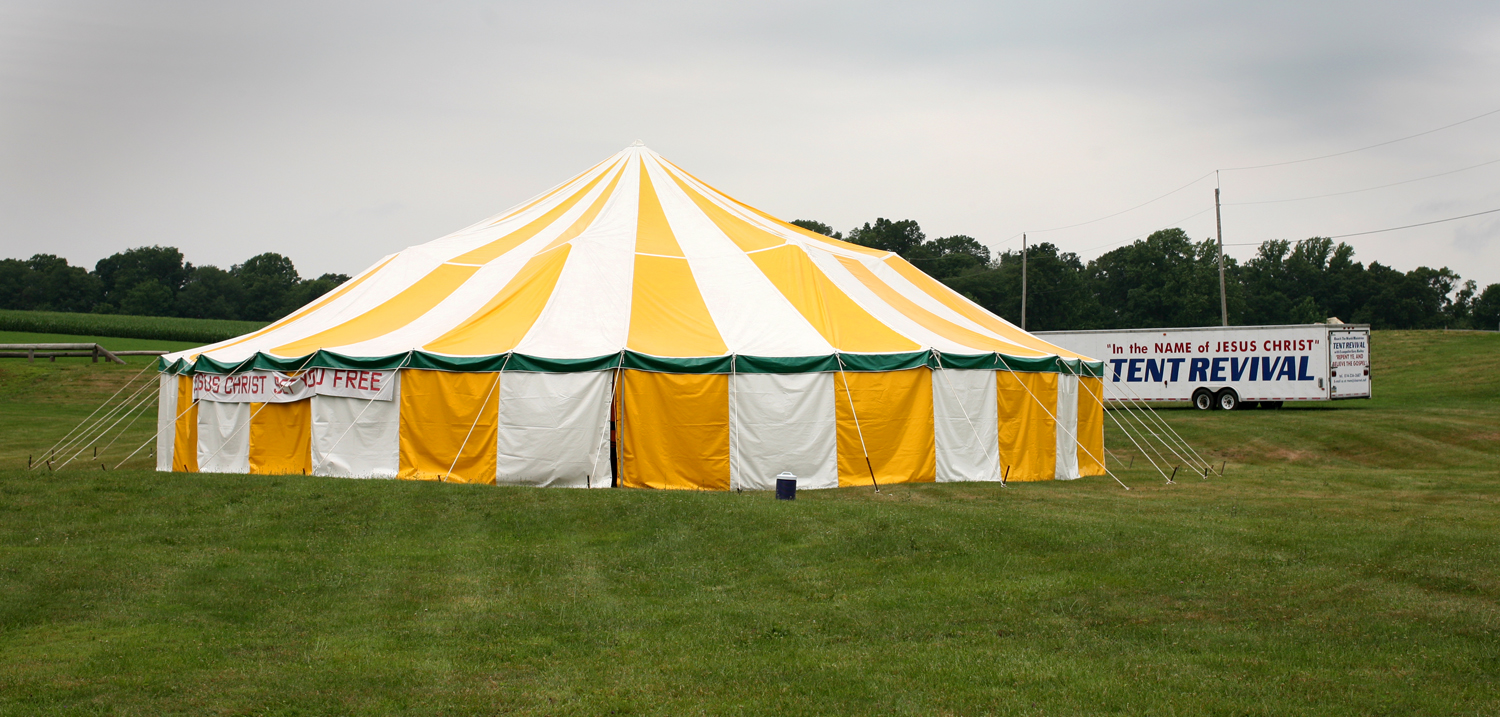
A marquee tent set up for a tent revival in rural Pennsylvania (2008)

Tent revivals, also known as tent meetings, are gatherings of Evangelical Christian worshipers in a tent erected specifically for the purpose of revival meetings, camp meetings, evangelism, and healing crusades in the United States. Historically, tent revivals and camp meetings had a prominent role in the spread of Evangelical Christianity through the Great Awakenings that occurred across the early United States before the American Civil War.

== History ==
Historically grounded in the cultural and socio-religious context of the First (c. 1730–1755), Second (c. 1790–1840), and Third (c. 1855–1930) Great Awakenings in British North America, most tent revivals in the United States have been held by the Methodist Church (inclusive of the Holiness movement), along with other Evangelical churches, as well as Pentecostal denominations, in addition to Baptist churches and non-denominational Protestant churches. Major Protestant evangelists and itinerant preachers in the history of the Great Awakenings who made use of tent revivals and camp meetings were George Whitefield, Jonathan Edwards, Gilbert Tennent, and Samuel Davies in 18th-century New England, while notable pastors and theologians that supported the American revival movement were James McGready, Timothy Dwight IV, Lyman Beecher, and Nathaniel W. Taylor.

A notable tent revival that took place outside of the United States was the first Keswick Convention at Saint John's Church in Keswick, England in 1875. This revival initiated the "Higher Life movement" among Evangelical Anglicans and British conservative Evangelicals, a Protestant theological tradition within Evangelical Christianity that espouses a distinct teaching on the doctrines of entire sanctification, healing, and spiritual gifts. Since the late 19th century, the movement has spread throughout the United Kingdom and across the former colonies of the British Empire.

As tent revivals are held outdoors, they attract people who, after hearing the preaching, are expected to undergo a conversion to Christianity, experience to be "born again", and join a local Christian church. With radio and television playing an increasingly important part in U.S. culture by the second half of the 20th century, some Christian preachers and tent revivalists, such as Oral Roberts, started to make use of broadcast mass media as early televangelists. Other Christian revivalists and evangelists who have been noted for their use of tent revivals in ministry include the married couple Anna Ladd and Frank Bartleman, Billy Sunday, William M. Branham, Billy Graham, Robert W. Schambach, Reinhard Bonnke, Benny Hinn, Jorge A. Pérez, and John M. Perkins.

In the Methodist tradition, tent revivals occur at various parts of the year, especially in the summer, for preaching the doctrine of the two works of grace: (1) the New Birth and (2) entire sanctification. Among Baptist denominations, preachers at tent revivals focus their sermons on the New Birth, with those receiving it undergoing baptism. Today, some tent revivals and camp meetings are ecumenical, with the participation of Christian preachers from different Protestant denominations, such as interdenominational parachurches.

== Cultural representations ==
=== Books ===
- Blood Meridian, a 1985 novel by Cormac McCarthy
- Elmer Gantry, a 1927 novel by Sinclair Lewis
- Revival, a 2014 novel by Stephen King

=== Films ===
- Blues Brothers 2000, a 1998 film starring Dan Aykroyd and John Goodman
- Elvis, a 2022 film directed by Baz Luhrmann and starring Austin Butler
- Jesus Revolution, a 2023 film starring Jonathan Roumie and Kelsey Grammer
- Joshua, a 2002 film starring F. Murray Abraham and Tony Goldwyn
- Leap of Faith, a 1992 film starring Steve Martin and Liam Neeson
- Marjoe, a 1972 documentary film on the life of American former evangelist Marjoe Gortner
- Resurrection, a 1980 film starring Ellen Burstyn and Sam Shepard
- The Night of the Hunter, a 1955 film starring Robert Mitchum and Shelley Winters

=== TV series ===
- Faith Off, an episode of The Simpsons (Season 11)
- Justified (Season 4), starring Timothy Olyphant and Nick Searcy
- True Detective (Season 1), starring Matthew McConaughey and Woody Harrelson

== See also ==
- Altar call
- Christian fundamentalism
- Christian revival
  - Brush arbor revival
  - Camp meeting
  - Revival meeting
- Chautauqua
- Decision theology
- Dispensationalism
- Lordship salvation
- Methodist worship
- Mourner's bench
- Protestantism in the United States
  - Baptists in the United States
  - Evangelicalism in the United States
  - List of megachurches in the United States
- Sinner's prayer
- Tabernacle (Methodist)
- Wesleyan theology
  - Assurance
  - Conditional preservation of the saints
  - Growth in grace
  - Outward holiness
  - Second work of grace

== Bibliography ==
- Case, Jay R. (2017). "Methodists and Holiness in North America". In Larsen, Timothy; Ledger-Lomas, Michael (eds.). The Oxford History of Protestant Dissenting Traditions, Volume III: The Nineteenth Century. Oxford and New York: Oxford University Press. pp. 211–230. doi:10.1093/oso/9780199683710.003.0009. ISBN 9780191823923. LCCN 2016953084.
- Sims, Patsy (1996) [1988]. Can Somebody Shout Amen!: Inside the Tents and Tabernacles of American Revivalists (Reprint ed.). Lexington, Kentucky and New York: St. Martin's Press/University Press of Kentucky. ISBN 9780813108865.
