= Decision theology =

Evangelical Protestant Christian doctrine

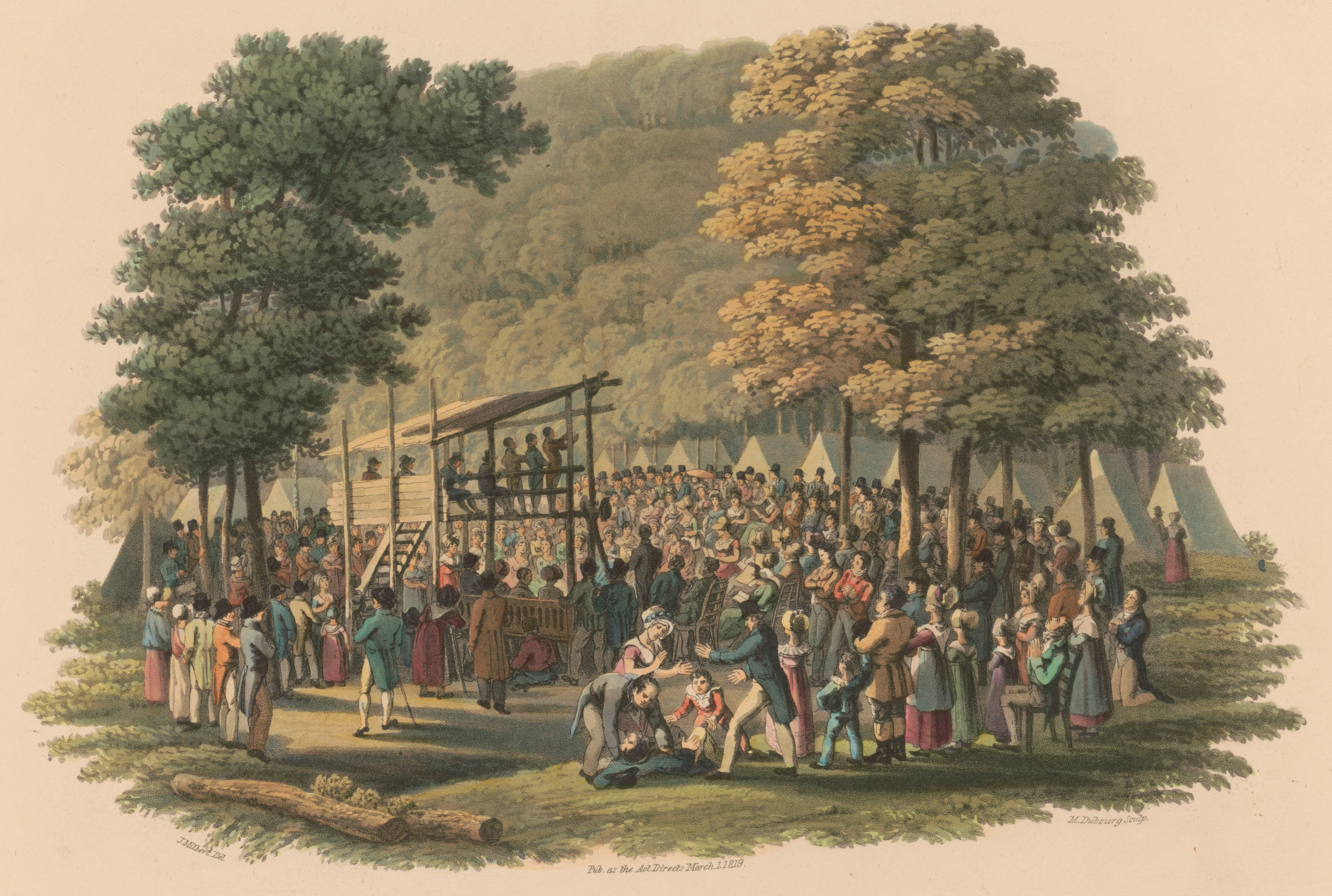
Methodist preachers are known for promulgating the doctrines of the New Birth and entire sanctification to the public at events such as tent revivals and camp meetings.

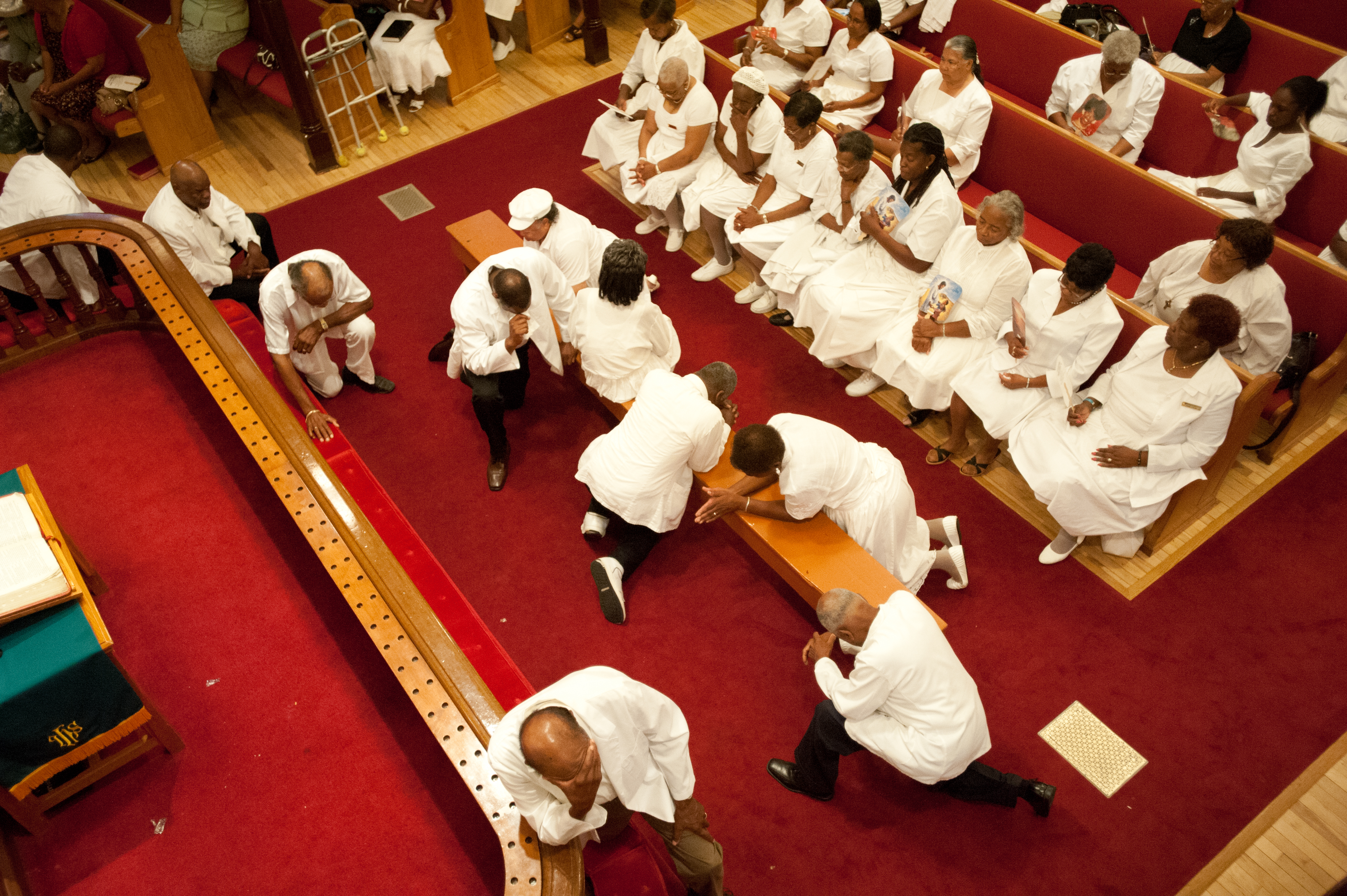
Christian worshipers at Mount Zion United Methodist Church praying at the mourner's bench and chancel rails, located in front of the altar (Pasadena, Maryland, U.S.)

Decision theology, also known as decisionism, is a Christian doctrine present in Evangelical Protestant denominations, such as the Methodist and Pentecostal churches, that holds an individual is called to make a personal and conscious decision to accept and follow Jesus Christ as their Lord and Savior to experience the New birth and be "born again".

In denominations of the Methodist Church (inclusive of the Holiness movement), after experiencing the New Birth (the first work of grace), it is taught that believers should seek entire sanctification (the second work of grace). While Methodists teach that these works of grace can be experienced anywhere, revival services in tents and camp meetings are often held to call individuals to experience the New Birth and entire sanctification; altar calls in which individuals approach the mourner's bench or chancel rails to seek these works of grace also take place in services of worship throughout the year.

Evangelical-Lutheran and Reformed Christians generally reject the tenets of Decision theology, believing that faith receives the gift of salvation from God rather than causing it. These denominations object to Decision theology as contradicting the monergistic doctrine of orthodox Lutheranism and Reformed (Calvinist) Christianity. Methodist theology, on the other hand, is synergistic and teaches that all individuals have free will to accept Jesus Christ and be made holy through his grace.

== See also ==
- Altar call
- Christian revival
- Great Awakening
- Lordship salvation
- Methodist worship
- Mourner's bench
- Sinner's prayer
- Tabernacle (Methodist)
- Tent revival
- Wesleyan theology
  - Assurance
  - Conditional preservation of the saints
  - Growth in grace
  - Outward holiness
  - Second work of grace
