= David W. Bebbington =

British historian

David W. Bebbington FRSE FRHistS
- Born: David William Bebbington; 25 July 1949 (age 77); Nottingham, England
- Spouse: Eileen Bebbington (m. 1971)

Academic background
- Education: Jesus College, Cambridge; Fitzwilliam College, Cambridge
- Thesis: The Nonconformist Conscience (1975)
- Doctoral advisor: David Thompson

Academic work
- Discipline: History
- Sub-discipline: Ecclesiastical history
- Institutions: University of Stirling
- Main interests: History of evangelicalism

David William Bebbington FRSE FRHistS (born 25 July 1949) is a British historian who is a professor of history at the University of Stirling in Scotland and a distinguished visiting professor of history at Baylor University. He is a Fellow of the Royal Society of Edinburgh and the Royal Historical Society.

== Biography ==
Bebbington was born in Nottingham, England, on 25 July 1949 and was raised in Sherwood, a northern suburb of Nottingham. An undergraduate at Jesus College, Cambridge (1968–1971), Bebbington began his doctoral studies there (1971–1973) before becoming a research fellow of Fitzwilliam College (1973–1976). Since 1976 he has taught at the University of Stirling, where since 1999 he has been Professor of History.

He was President of the Ecclesiastical History Society (2006–2007).

== Bebbington quadrilateral ==
Bebbington is widely known for his definition of evangelicalism, referred to as the Bebbington quadrilateral, which was first provided in his 1989 classic study Evangelicalism in Modern Britain: A History from the 1730s to the 1980s. Bebbington identifies four main qualities which are to be used in defining evangelical convictions and attitudes:

- Biblicism: a particular regard for the Bible (e.g. all essential spiritual truth is to be found in its pages)
- Crucicentrism: a focus on the atoning work of Christ on the cross
- Conversionism: the belief that human beings need to be converted
- Activism: the belief that the gospel needs to be expressed in effort

Bebbington (along with Mark Noll and others) has exerted a large amount of effort in placing evangelicalism on the world map of religious history. Through their efforts they have made it more difficult for scholars to ignore the influence of evangelicals in the world since the movement's inception in the eighteenth century.

== Works ==
=== Thesis ===
- Bebbington, David W. (1975). The Nonconformist Conscience: A Study of the Political Attitudes and Activities of Evangelical Nonconformists, 1886–1902 (PhD thesis). Cambridge: Cambridge University.

=== Books ===
- Bebbington, David W. (1979). Patterns in History: A Christian View.
- ——— (1982). The Nonconformist Conscience: Chapel and Politics, 1870-1914.
- ——— (1989). Evangelicalism in Modern Britain: A History from the 1730s to the 1980s. ISBN 978-0-04-941019-0.
- ——— (1992). Victorian Nonconformity.
- ——— (1993). William Ewart Gladstone: Faith and Politics in Victorian Britain.
- ———; Noll, Mark A.; Rawlyk, George A., eds. (1994). Evangelicalism: Comparative Studies of Popular Protestantism in North America, the British Isles and Beyond, 1700-1990.
- ——— (2000). Holiness in Nineteenth-Century England.
- ———; Swift, Roger, eds. (2000). Gladstone Centenary Essays.
- ———, ed. (2002). The Gospel in the World: International Baptist Studies. Studies in Baptist history and thought. Vol. 1.
- ———; Larsen, Timothy, eds. (2003). Modern Christianity and Cultural Aspirations.
- ——— (2004). The Mind of Gladstone: Religion. Homer and Politics. Oxford University Press. ISBN 978-0-19-926765-1.
- ——— (2005). The Dominance of Evangelicalism: The Age of Spurgeon and Moody. InterVarsity Press.
- ———; Dix, Kenneth; Ruston, Alan, eds. (2006). Protestant Nonconformist Texts: The Nineteenth Century.
- ——— (2007). Congregational Members of Parliament in the Nineteenth Century.
- ——— (2010). Baptists Through the Centuries: A History of a Global People. Baylor University Press.
- ——— (2012). Victorian Religious Revivals: Culture and Piety in Local and Global Contexts. Oxford University Press.
- ——— (2013). Evangelicalism and Fundamentalism in the United Kingdom during the Twentieth Century. Oxford University Press.

Professional and academic associations
Preceded by Dame Averil Cameron	President of the Ecclesiastical History Society; 2006–2007	Succeeded by Robert Swanson
