= Mourner's bench =

Bench located in front of the chancel of a church

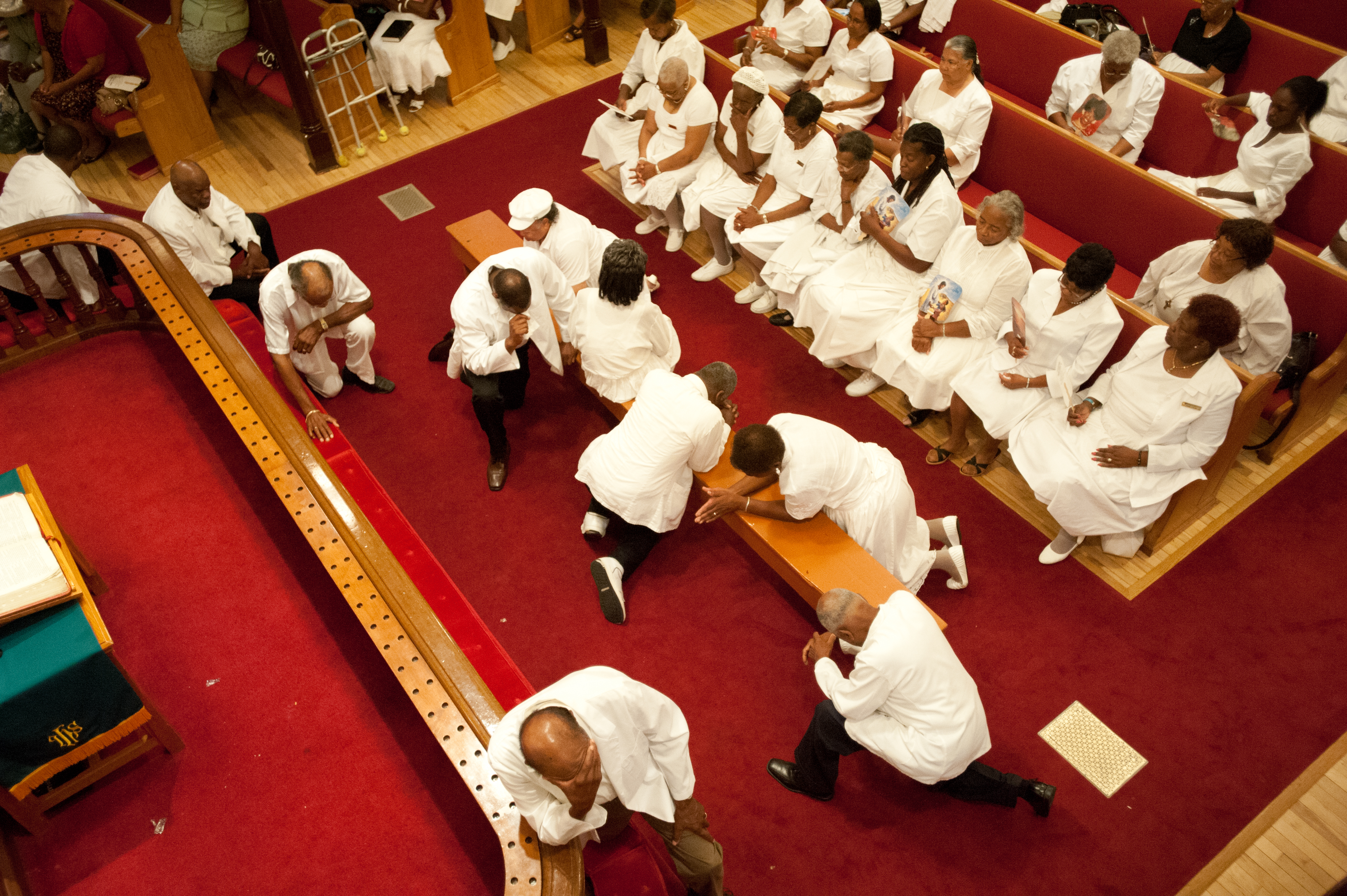
Christian worshipers at Mount Zion United Methodist Church praying at the mourners' bench and chancel rails, located in front of the altar (Pasadena, Maryland, U.S.)

The mourner's bench or mourners' bench, also known as the mercy seat or anxious bench, is a bench located in front of the chancel in the Methodist Church (inclusive of the Holiness movement) and other Evangelical Christian denominations.

The practice was instituted by the 18th-century English preacher and theologian John Wesley, the founder of Methodism. Today many, but not all, Methodist churches supplant the mourners' bench with chancel rails, where Methodists and other Evangelical Christians receive Holy Communion, in addition to experiencing the New Birth, repenting of their sins, and praying.

Individuals kneel at the mourners' bench to experience the two works of grace in Methodism: (1) the New Birth and (2) entire sanctification. Others, especially backsliders, use the mourners' bench to confess, repent of their sins, and receive forgiveness from God, in order to continue the process of sanctification. At the mourners' bench, individuals receive spiritual counsel from a Christian minister. In keeping with the doctrine of the mortification of the flesh, penitents do not kneel on kneeler cushions but instead kneel on the floor.

== See also ==
- Altar call
- Christian revival
- Decision theology
- Great Awakenings
- Lordship salvation
- Methodist worship
- Sinner's prayer
- Tabernacle (Methodist)
- Tent revival
- Wesleyan theology
  - Assurance
  - Conditional preservation of the saints
  - Growth in grace
  - Outward holiness
  - Second work of grace
