= Timothy Larsen =

American historian and religious scholar

- Born: 4 September 1967 (age 59)

Academic background
- Education: Wheaton College; University of Stirling
- Thesis: Friends of Religious Equality (1997)
- Doctoral advisor: David W. Bebbington

Academic work
- Discipline: History
- Sub-discipline: Ecclesiastical history
- Institutions: Wheaton College

Timothy Larsen (born 4 September 1967) is an American historian and the Carolyn and Fred McManis Chair of Christian Thought at Wheaton College. Larsen completed a bachelor's and master's degree at Wheaton College and obtained a doctorate in history at the University of Stirling. He is a fellow of the Royal Historical Society.
