= Altar rail =

Barrier or low rails in front of the altar of a church

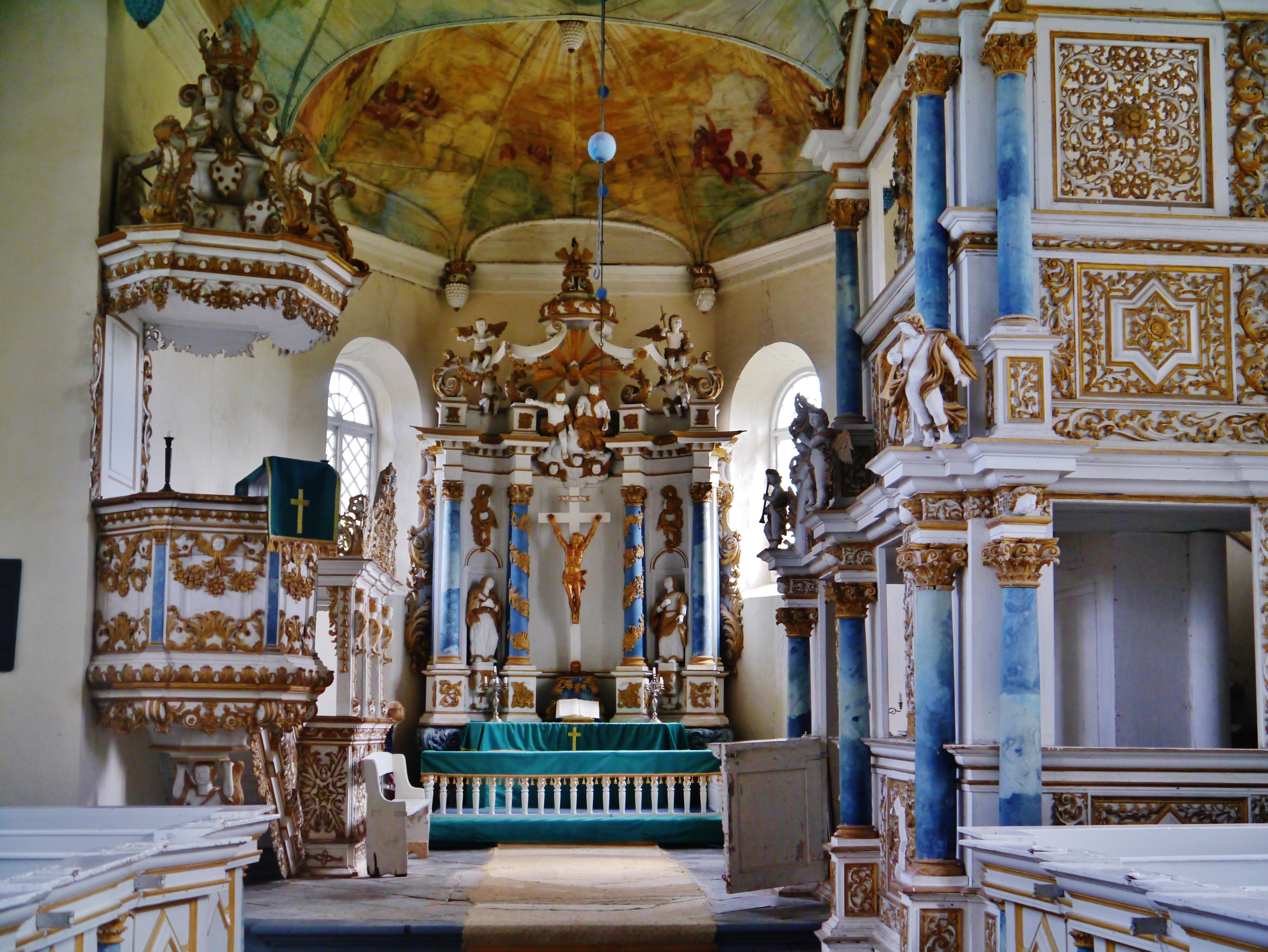
Altar rail in the center of Apriķu Lutheran Church in Laža Parish, Latvia

The faithful receive the Eucharist kneeling on the chancel rail during the offering of the Mass at Vadstena Abbey Church (Evangelical-Lutheran) in Sweden

The altar rail (also known as a communion rail or chancel rail) is a low barrier, sometimes ornate and usually made of stone, wood or metal in some combination, delimiting the chancel or the sanctuary and altar in a church from the nave and other parts that contain the congregation. Often, a central gate or gap divides the line into two parts. Chancel rails are a very common, but not universal, feature of Catholic, Lutheran, Anglican, and Methodist churches. They are usually about 2 feet 6 inches (76 cm) high, with a padded step at the bottom, and designed so that the wider top of the rail can support the forearms or elbows of a kneeling person.

The altar rail is a modest substitute for earlier barriers demarcating the chancel, the area containing the altar, which was reserved, with greatly varying degrees of strictness, for officiating clergy, as well as choristers and altar servers. Although it only emerged after the Protestant Reformation, it has been found convenient by both Catholic and more traditional Protestant churches, such as the Lutheran and Anglican churches, as well as by those in the free church tradition, such as the Methodist churches. After the Second Vatican Council, a number of Catholic churches removed their chancel rails, which fell into disuse; on the other hand, Lutheran churches continue to retain many features of medieval church architecture and normatively have chancel rails at which communicants receive the Eucharist.

For those chancels without an altar rail, in some cases a portable rail with attached kneeler is used for those who wish to kneel to receive the Eucharist.

== History ==
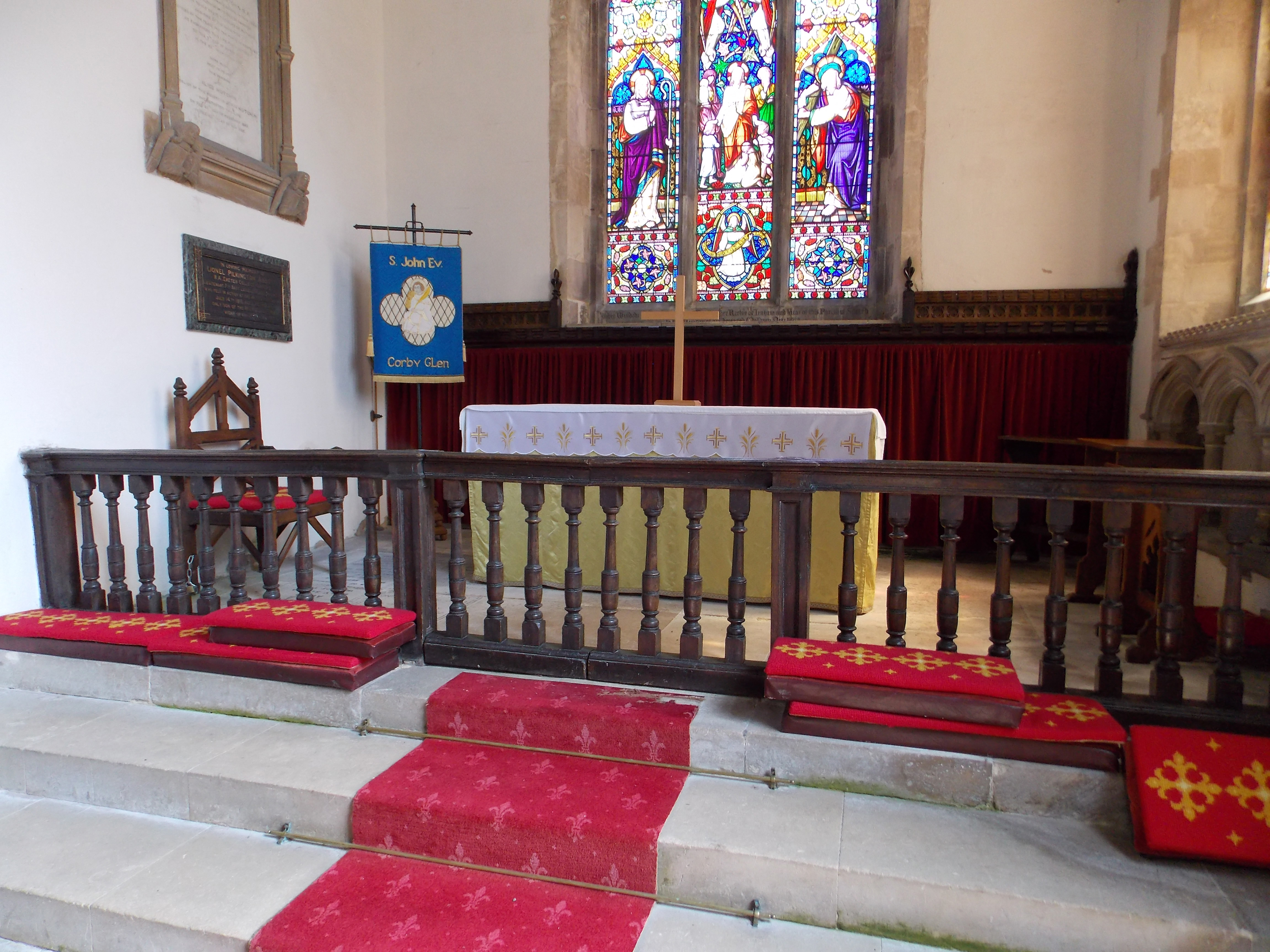
English 17th-century wooden rails at St John's Church, Corby Glen

Barriers of various kinds often mark off as especially sacred the area of a church close to the altar—the chancel—which is largely reserved for ordained clergy. The Temple in Jerusalem contained a barrier of this kind, which separated the Courtyard of the Israelites from the Courtyard of the Priests. The templon was typical for the Late Antique period. In the Armenian Apostolic Church, curtains are still drawn to cut off that area during the holiest moments of the liturgy. In Eastern Orthodox and related rites, this evolved into a solid, icon-clad screen, called the iconostasis, that has three doorways which usually have doors and curtains that can be closed or drawn aside at various times.

Barriers demarcating the chancel, such as the rood screen, became increasing elaborate. They were largely swept away after both the Protestant Reformation and then the Counter-Reformation prioritized the congregation having a good view of what was happening in the chancel. Now the low communion rail is generally the only barrier. Despite being essentially a Counter-Reformation invention, this has proved useful and accepted in the Protestant churches that dispense communion. The screen enjoyed a small revival in the 19th century, after the passionate urgings of Augustus Pugin, who wrote A Treatise on Chancel Screens and Rood Lofts, and others. There were medieval structures like communion rails, but the various types of screen were much more common. A church in Hasle, Bornholm claims to have "a rare 15th-century altar rail"; perhaps, like other examples, this is in fact a sawn-off medieval screen.

The origin of the modern form has been described by one historian as "nebulous", but it probably emerged from Italy in the 16th century. The German Lutherans and the Church of England were not far behind in adopting it, perhaps without being aware of the Italian versions. In England the rail became one of the focuses of tussles between the High Church and Low Church factions, and in many churches they were added, removed and re-added at different times. Archbishop Laud was a strong supporter of rails, but the common story that he introduced them to England is incorrect; he was trying to prevent Puritan clergy from continuing to remove them, and his pressure in favour of rails was bound up with his very controversial "altar policy", reasserting the placement of the altar in its medieval position. Matthew Wren, Laud's Bishop of Ely, was imprisoned during the whole of the English Commonwealth. Wren defended himself against charges of enforcing altar rails, which he pointed out had been found in many English churches "time out of mind". In both Catholic churches and Anglican ones following Laudian instructions, the congregation was now asked to come up to the rails and receive communion kneeling at them, replacing a variety of earlier habits. This too was controversial in England, and the Laudian party did not push too hard for this in many dioceses.

In many of the parishes of the Lutheran Churches, the use of altar rails has remained more common. There is typically no specific regulation concerning their presence or use, although they remain a common feature even in newly-constructed churches. They continue to be popular because many prefer to kneel to receive the Eucharist.

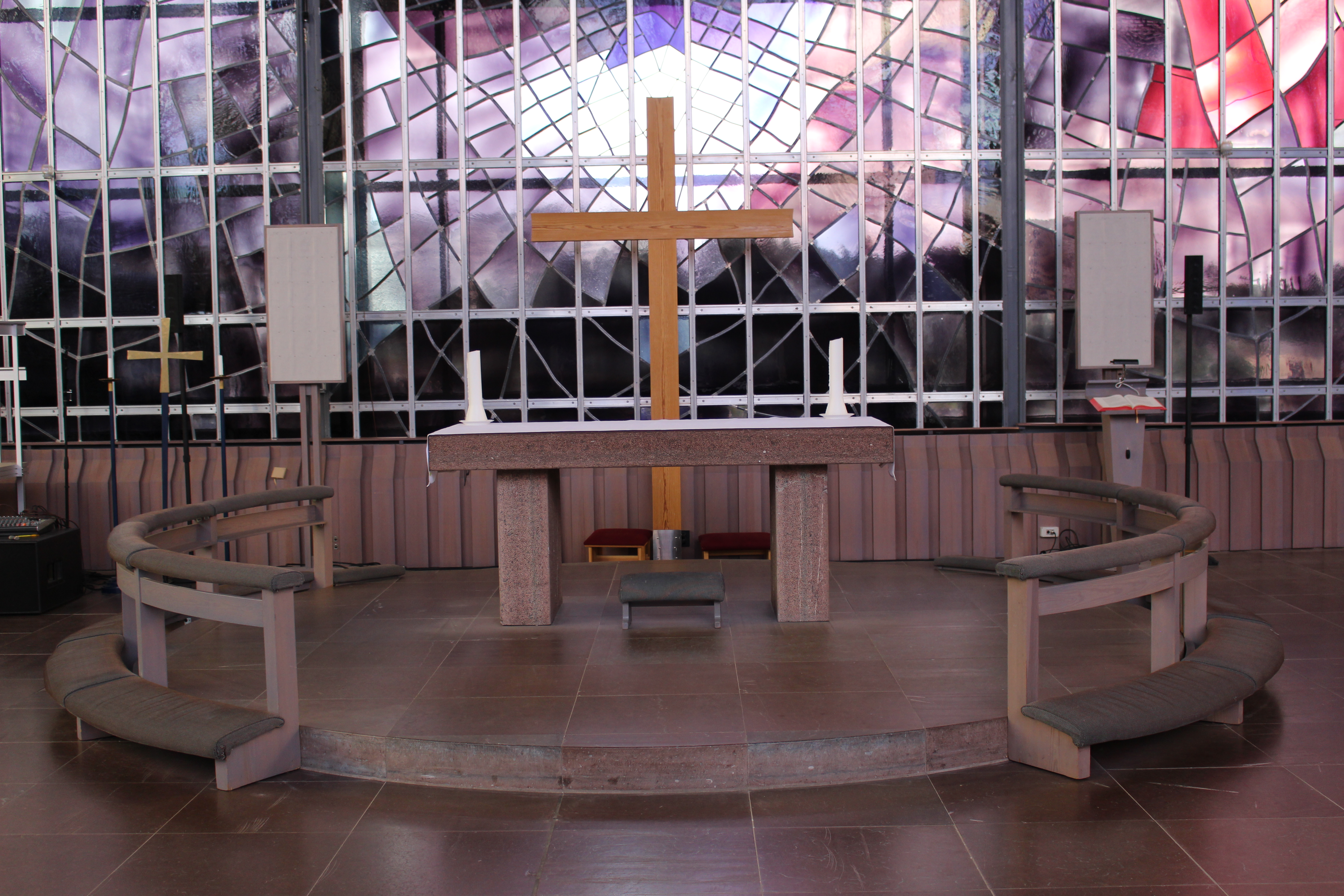
Altar railing in Tibble kyrka in Täby, Sweden. Church built in the mid-1970s. An example of the common use of altar railing in newly constructed churches in the Evangelical-Lutheran Church of Sweden.

Chancel rails are found in a number of Methodist churches; and in addition to Holy Communion, they are used for worshippers to seek the New Birth and Entire Sanctification.

== Catholic Church ==
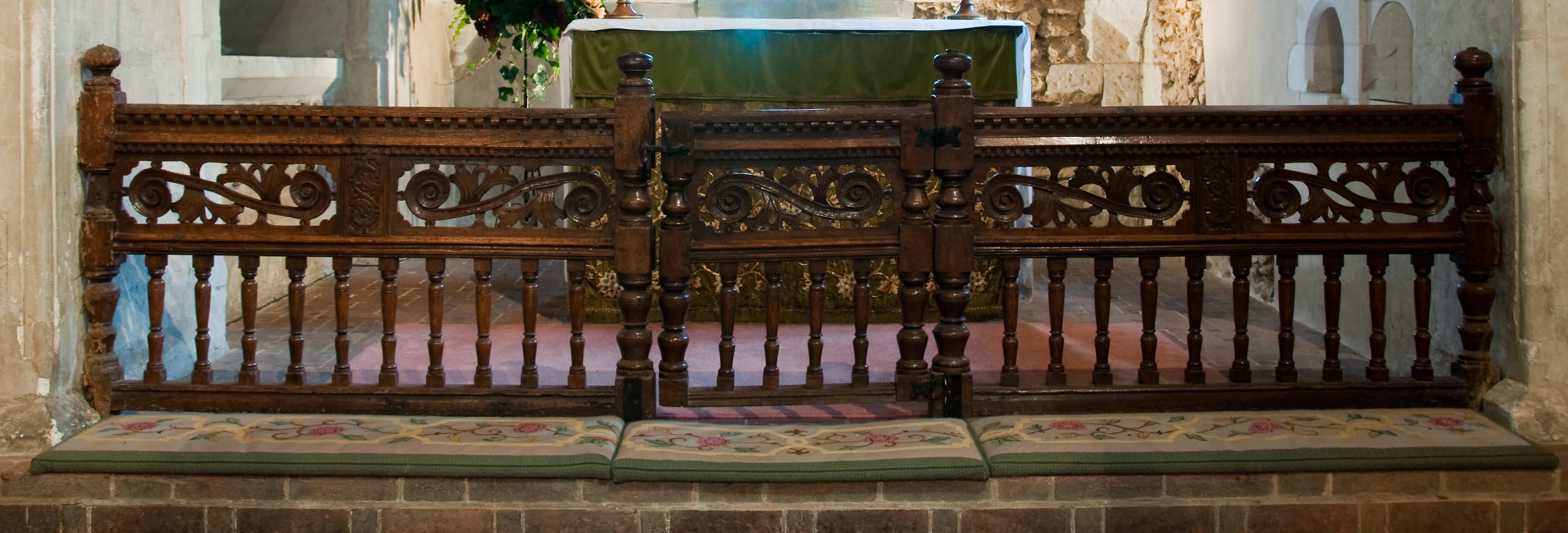
Altar rails at the Church of St. Nicholas in Compton, Surrey.

Newly-constructed Catholic churches rarely have altar rails, although they were once common in parish churches; those of the late 19th century were particularly decorative. Communicants knelt at the railings to receive the Eucharist by a priest. After the Second Vatican Council, many parishes removed their altar rails, and an unfounded idea arose that the council or the Holy See had ordered the change.

Some Catholics and many architects and planners criticised some removals, often on liturgical, historical and aesthetic grounds. While in some states, the Catholic Church has adopted a minimalist approach towards the removal of altar rails; in some countries, for example in Ireland, almost every re-ordering eliminated altar rails. Many Catholics resisted the changes: some took legal action to try to prevent the removal of altar rails and of other traditional features in pre-Vatican II sanctuaries.

Not all Catholics supported the changes to sanctuaries. Some disputed the belief that the altar rails were a barrier, claiming that many churches were able to allow full participation by the laity in the Ordinary form without removing altar rails. In recent times, a number of restorations of historic churches have re-introduced altar rails, since the idea that Vatican II required their removal is a misconception.

The General Instruction of the Roman Missal states that the sanctuary "should be appropriately marked off from the body of the church either by its being somewhat elevated or by a particular structure and ornamentation".

== Evangelical-Lutheran Churches ==
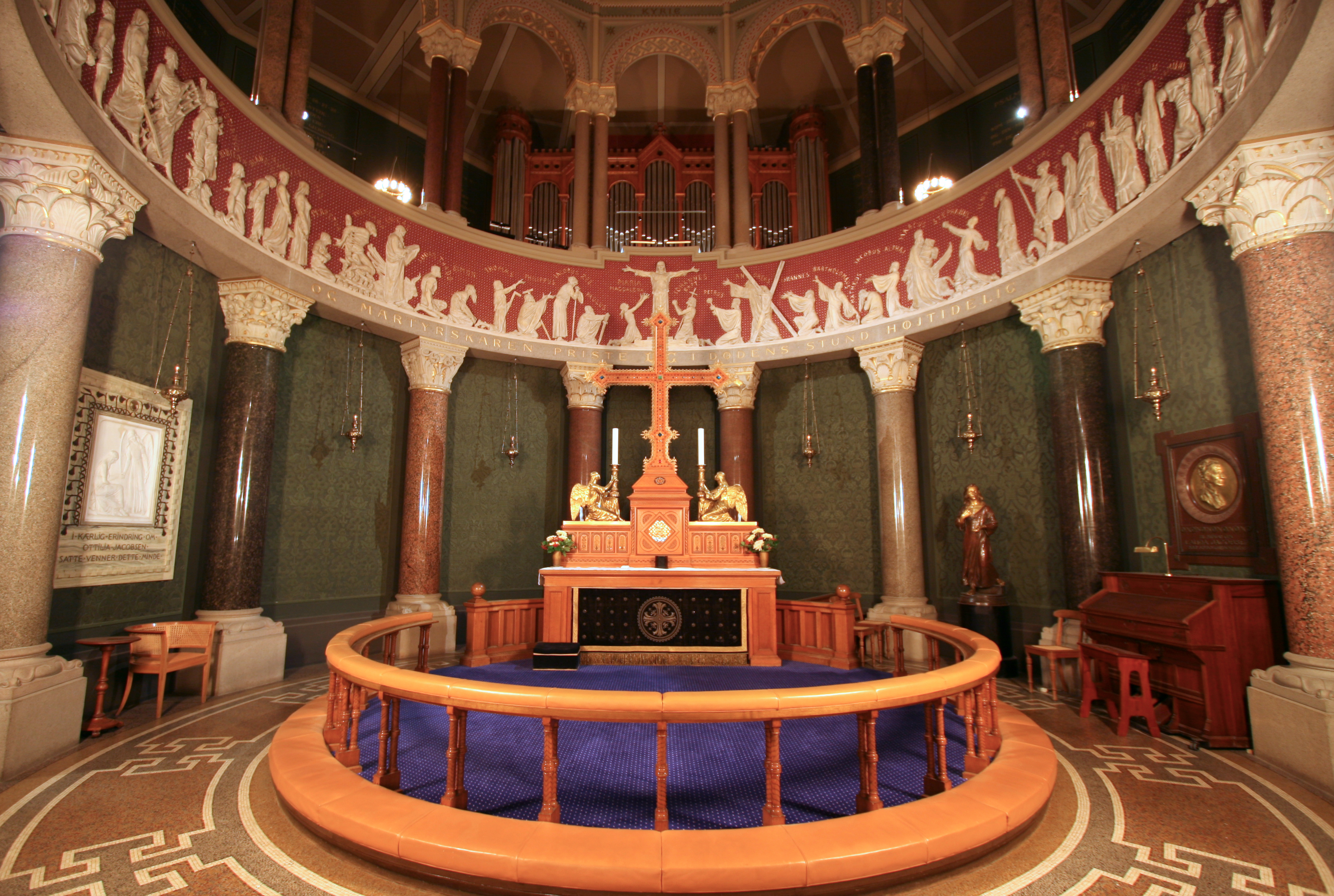
Evangelical-Lutheran chancel rails in Copenhagen, Denmark

Within Lutheranism, the altar rail is the common place for a pastor to hear a confession, confession being generally required to receive the Eucharist for the first time.

== Anglican Churches ==
A number of Anglican churches have retained the communion rail. The Black Rubric explicates Anglican doctrine behind kneeling to receive the Lord's Supper: "a signification of our humble and grateful acknowledgment of the benefits of Christ therein given to all worthy Receivers, and for the avoiding of such profanation and disorder in the holy Communion".

== Methodist Churches ==
In many Methodist churches, communicants receive holy communion at the chancel rails, devoutly kneeling. Many people also go to the chancel rail during the part of the Methodist liturgy called the Altar Call or An Invitation to Christian Discipleship, to experience the New Birth. A number of people who have already had the New Birth go to the chancel rails to receive entire sanctification. Others go there repent of their sins, as well as to pray. During this time, a Methodist minister attends to each person at the chancel rail, offering spiritual counsel.

In Methodist congregations that are more liturgical, the rite of confirmation, as well as the imposition of ashes on Ash Wednesday, may take place at the chancel rail in many Methodist parishes.

== Gallery ==
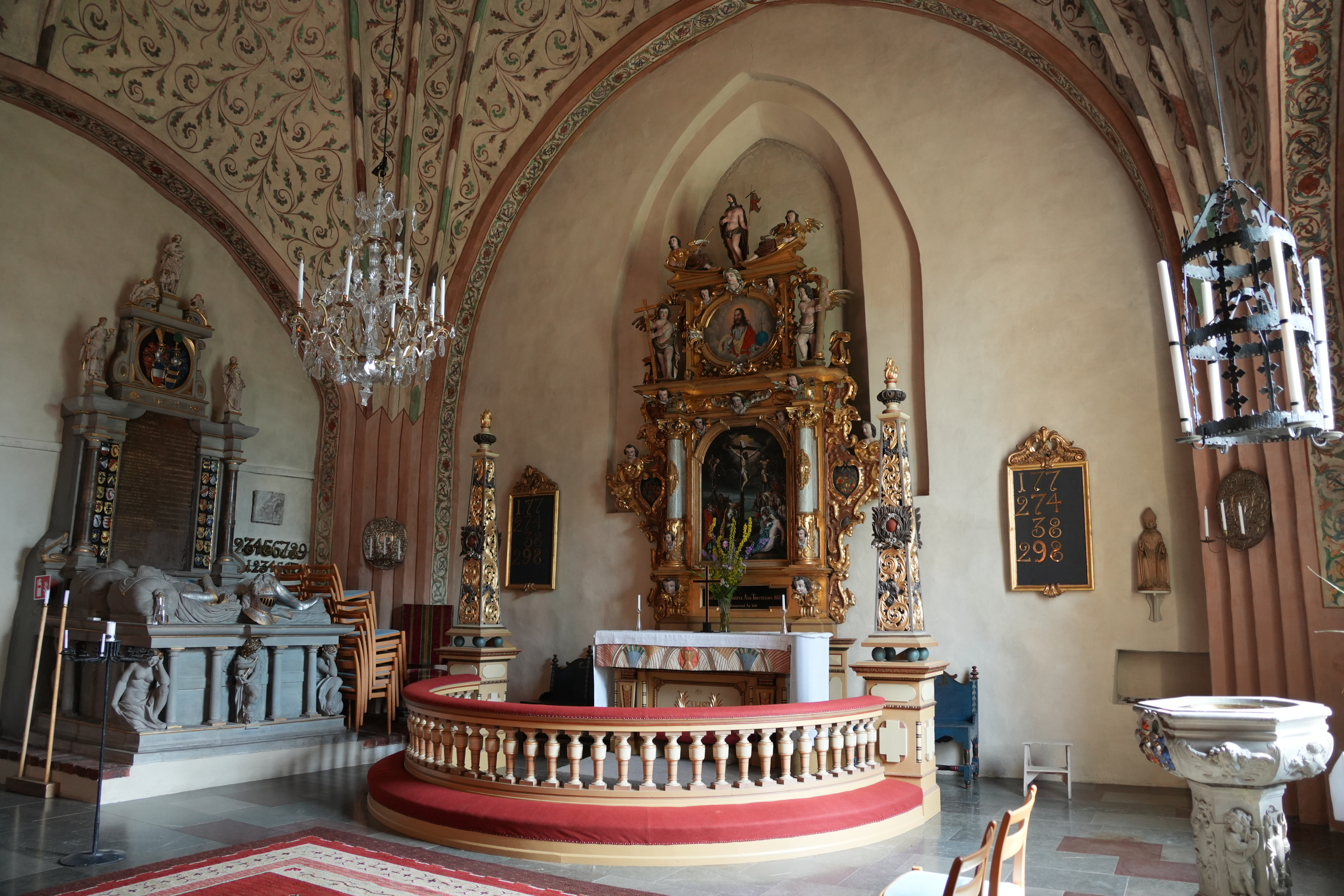
The communion rail at Länna Church (Evangelical-Lutheran) in Norrtälje, Sweden

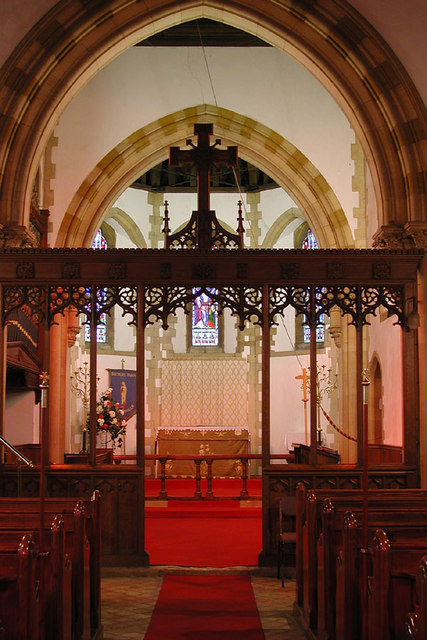
Anglican chancel rails in Moggerhanger, England

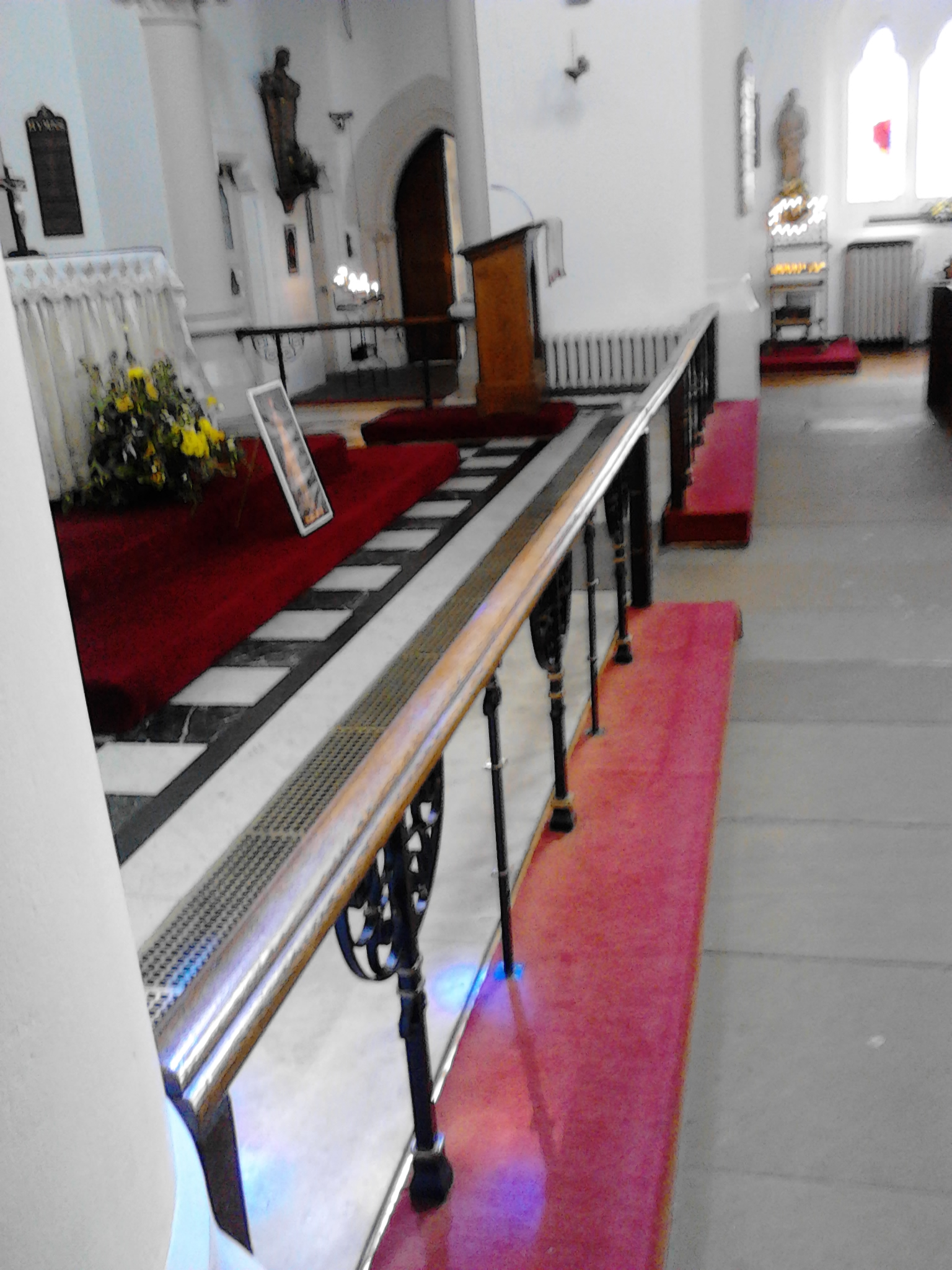
Wooden and iron chancel rails in St Pancras Church, Ipswich

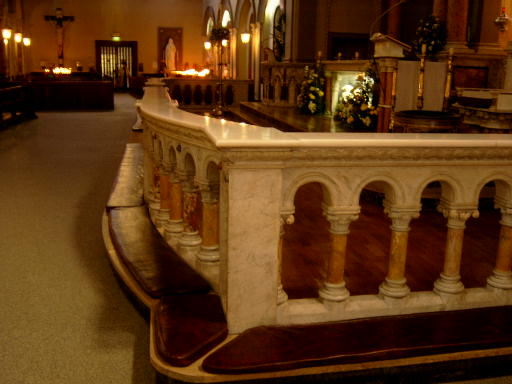
A set of altar rails in St. Teresa's Carmelite Church (Roman Catholic) in Dublin

== See also ==
- Mourners' bench

== Notes and references ==
- Cox, J. Charles, English Church Fittings, Furniture and Accessories, 2008 reprint, Jeremy Mills Publishing, ISBN 1905217935, 9781905217939, google books
- Spurr, John, The Post-Reformation: Religion, Politics and Society in Britain, 1603-1714, 2014 reprint, Routledge, ISBN 1317882628, 9781317882626, google books
