= Altar call =

Tradition in some Christian churches

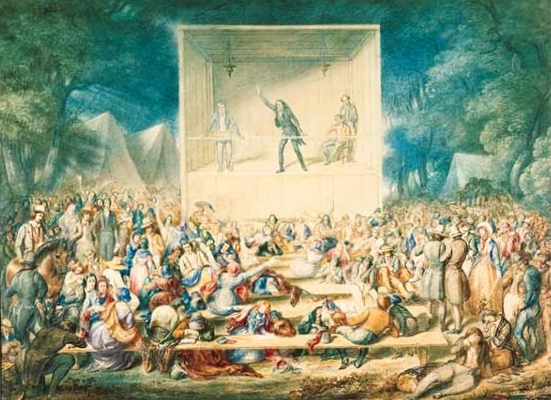
The Second Great Awakening, when altar calls became popular

An altar call is a tradition in some Christian churches in which those who wish to make a new spiritual commitment to Jesus Christ are invited to come forward publicly. It is so named because the supplicants gather before the altar located at the front of the church sanctuary; it is common for people to kneel at the chancel rails or mourner's bench that delimits the altar. Most altar calls occur at the conclusion of a sermon or homily.

== Background ==
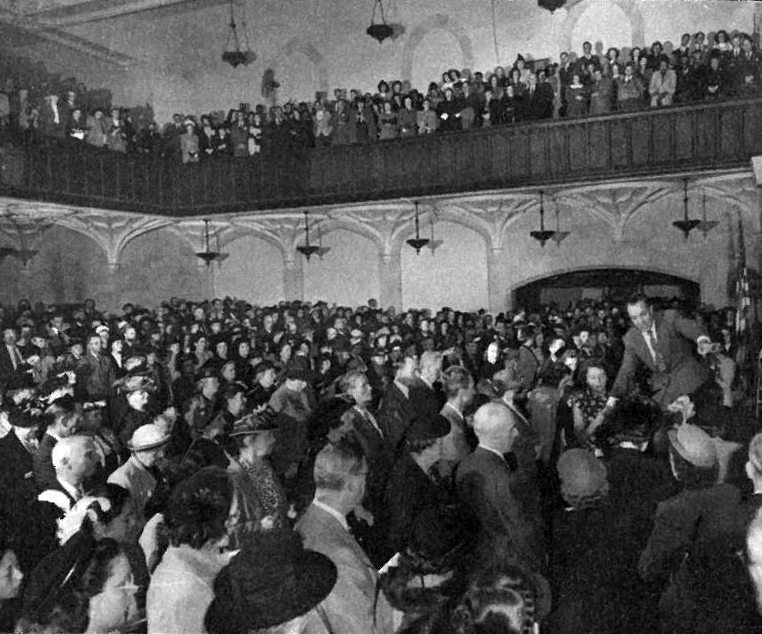
Altar call at Calvary Baptist Church, New York led by William Ward Ayer

Altar calls are a recent historic phenomenon beginning in the 1830s in America. During these, people approached the chancel rails, anxious seat, or mourner's bench to pray. One of the most famous 19th-century revivalists, Charles Grandison Finney, "popularized the idea of the 'altar call' in order to sign up his converts for the abolition movement" according to Jim Wallis. In many churches of Wesleyan-Arminian (Methodist) theology, the altar call, in addition to being an invitation for people to experience the new birth, is also often used to implore believers to experience the second work of grace, known as entire sanctification (baptism with the Holy Spirit). Notable examples in history of using altar calls include Billy Sunday, D. L. Moody, and Billy Graham.

The use of altar calls is controversial. Rick Warren notes that the Bible does not refer to any similar practice. Some in the Reformed churches object to the use of the altar call for a variety of reasons. It is argued that the practice is intimidating and therefore creates an unnecessary and artificial barrier to those who would become Christians but are then unwilling to make an immediate public profession under the gaze of an assembly. Others object in that they may mislead people into confusing outward conduct with spiritual change. In doing so, they argue, altar calls may actually give people false assurance about their salvation. In addition, Carey Hardy argues that they change "the essence of the gospel", create believers with false professions of faith, and do not "follow the biblical method for public identification".

== See also ==
- Arminianism
- Asking Jesus into one's heart
- Camp meeting
- Conversion to Christianity
- Evangelicalism
- Evangelism
- Monergism
- Regeneration
- Sinner's prayer
- Synergism
- Decision theology
