= Agonoclita =

7th-century Christian sect

Agonoclita or the Agonoclites in antiquity was a Christian sect from the 7th century whose distinguishing principle was never to kneel, but to deliver all their prayers standing.

== Etymology ==
The name of this group is derived from the following Greek words: the privative particle α ("not"), γονυ ("knee"), and κλινω ("I bend").

== See also ==
- List of Christian denominations
- Genuflection
- Obeisance
- Prostration
- Prayer mat
- Zemnoy poklon
- Bowing
- Religious denomination
- List of religions and spiritual traditions
- Timeline of Christianity
