= Standing =

Human position in which the body is held upright

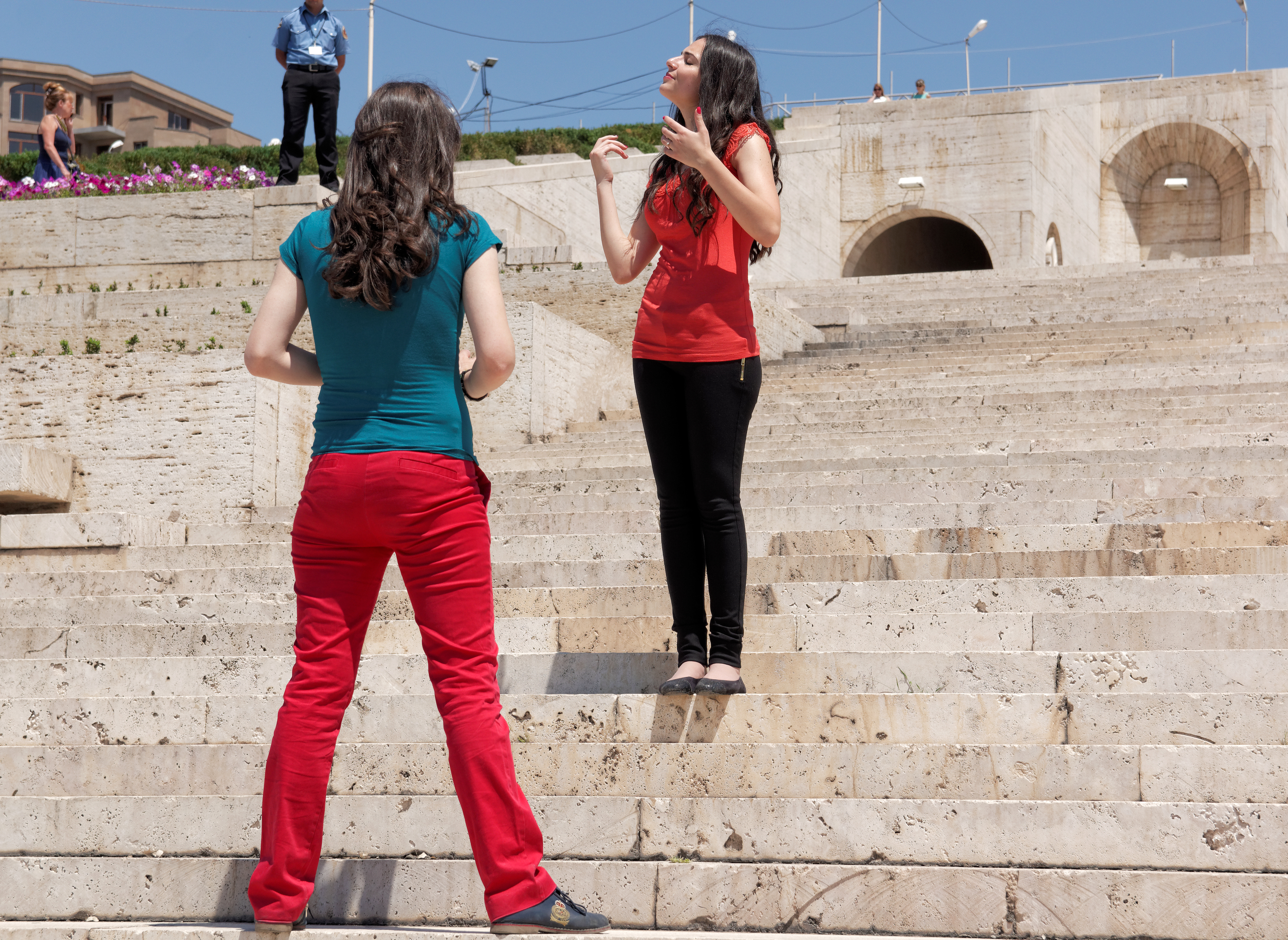
Standing women

Standing, also referred to as orthostasis, is a position in which the body is held in an upright (orthostatic) position and supported only by the feet. Although seemingly static, the body rocks slightly back and forth from the ankle in the sagittal plane, which bisects the body into right and left sides. The sway of quiet standing is often likened to the motion of an inverted pendulum.

Standing at attention is a military standing posture, as is stand at ease, but these terms are also used in military-style organisations and in some professions which involve standing, such as modeling. At ease refers to the classic military position of standing with legs slightly apart, not in as formal or regimented a pose as standing at attention. In modeling, model at ease refers to the model standing with one leg straight, with the majority of the weight on it, and the other leg tucked over and slightly around. There may be a time when a person is standing, where they lose control due to an external force or lack of energy, where they accelerate to the ground due to gravity. This is known as "falling" and may result in injuries around the part of the body that made contact with the ground.

== Control ==
Standing posture relies on dynamic, rather than static, balance. The human center of mass is in front of the ankle, and unlike in quadrupeds, the base of support is narrow, consisting of only two feet. A static pose would cause humans to fall forward onto the face. In addition, there are constant external perturbations, such as breezes, and internal perturbations that come from respiration. Erect posture requires adjustment and correction. There are many mechanisms in the body that are suggested to control this, e.g. a spring action in muscles, higher control from the nervous system or core muscles. Humans begin to stand between 8 and 12 months of age.

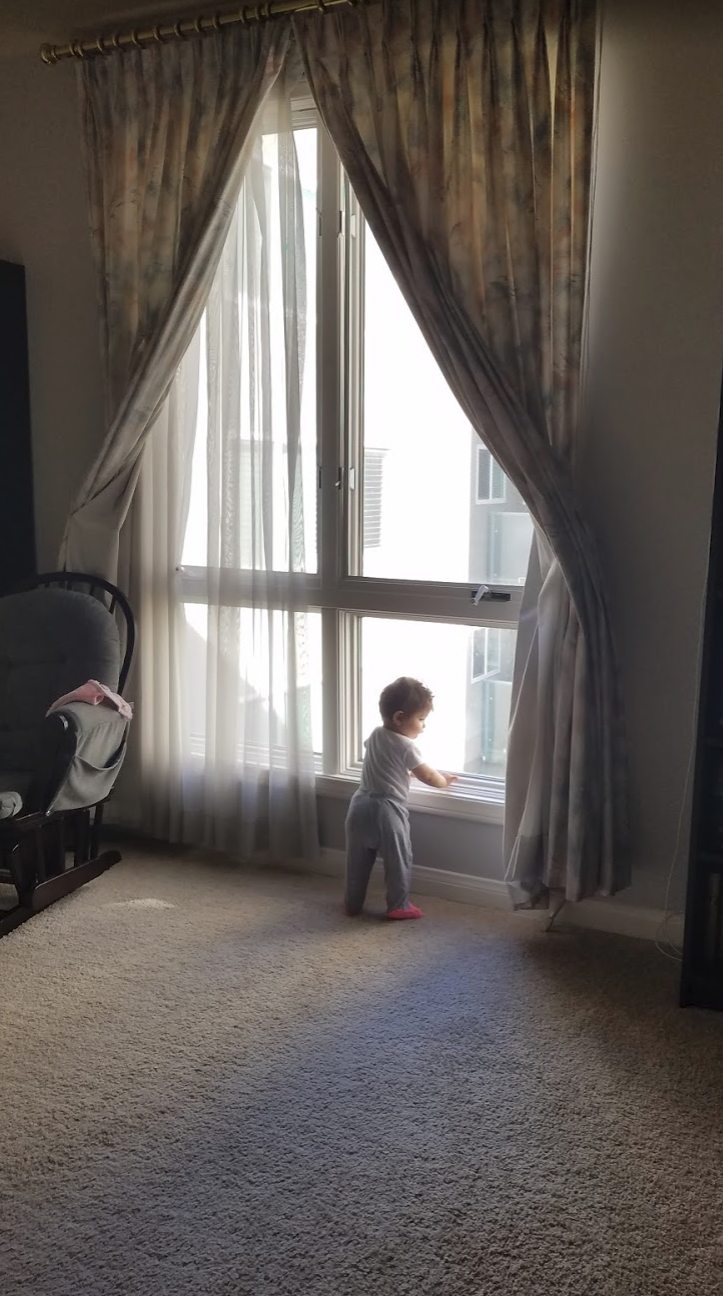
A child learning to stand

=== Spring action ===
Traditionally, such correction was explained by the spring action of the muscles, a local mechanism taking place without the intervention of the central nervous system. Recent studies, however, show that this spring action by itself is insufficient to prevent a forward fall. Also, human sway is too complicated to be adequately explained by spring action.

=== Nervous system ===
According to current theory, the nervous system continually and unconsciously monitors our direction and velocity. The vertical body axis alternates between tilting forward and backward. Before each tilt reaches the tipover point, the nervous system counters with a signal to reverse direction. Sway also occurs in the hip, and there is a slight winding and unwinding of the lower back.

An analogy would be a ball that volleys back and forth between two players without touching the ground. The muscle exertion required to maintain an aligned standing posture is crucial but minimal. Electromyography has detected slight activity in the muscles of the calves, hips and lower back.

=== Core muscles ===
The core muscles play a role in maintaining stability. The core muscles are deep muscle layers that lie close to the spine and provide structural support. The transverse abdominals wrap around the spine and function as a compression corset. The multifidi are intersegmental muscles. Dysfunction in the core muscles has been implicated in back pain.

== Expansion of pendulum model ==
Some investigators have replaced the ankle inverted pendulum analogy with a model of double linked pendulums involving both hip and ankle sway. Neither model is accepted as more than an approximation. Analysis of postural sway shows much more variation than is seen in a physical pendulum or even a pair of coupled pendulums. Furthermore, quiet standing involves activity in all joints, not just the ankles or hips.

In the past, the variation was attributed to random effects. A more recent interpretation is that sway has a fractal structure. A fractal pattern consists of a motif repeated at varying levels of magnification. The levels are related by a ratio called the fractal dimension. It is believed that the fractal pattern offers a range of fine and gross control tuning. Fractal dimension is altered in some motor dysfunctions. In other words, the body cannot compensate well enough for imbalances.

== Pathology ==
Although standing per se is not dangerous, there are pathologies associated with it. One short term condition is orthostatic hypotension, and long term conditions are sore feet, stiff legs and low back pain.

=== Orthostatic hypotension ===
Orthostatic hypotension is characterized by unusually low blood pressure when the patient is standing up.

It can cause dizziness, lightheadedness, headache, blurred or dimmed vision and fainting, because the brain does not get sufficient blood supply. This, in turn, is caused by gravity, pulling the blood into the lower part of the body.

Normally, the body compensates, but in the presence of other factors, e.g. hypovolemia, diseases and medications, this response may not be sufficient.

There are medications to treat hypotension. In addition, there are many lifestyle advisories. Many of them, however, are specific for a certain cause of orthostatic hypotension, e.g. maintaining a proper fluid intake in dehydration.

=== Orthostatic hypercoagulability ===
Prolonged still standing significantly activates the coagulation cascade, called orthostatic hypercoagulability. Overall, it causes an increase in transcapillary hydrostatic pressure. As a result, approximately 12% of blood plasma volume crosses into the extravascular compartment. This plasma shift causes an increase in the concentration of coagulation factors and other proteins of coagulation, in turn causing hypercoagulability.

=== Orthostatic tremor ===
Characterized by fast (12–18 Hz) rhythmic muscle contractions that occur in the legs and trunk immediately after standing. No other clinical signs or symptoms are present and the shaking ceases when the patient sits or is lifted off the ground. The high frequency of the tremor often creates a rippling effect on the leg muscles while standing.

=== Long-term complications ===
Standing per se does not pose any harm. In the long term, however, complications may arise.

== See also ==
- At attention – Military posture
- Agonoclita – 7th-century Christian sect, a former Christian group that said prayers standing
- Human position – Physical configurations of the human body
- Prostration – Reverential or submissive posture
- Standing desk – Desk for working while standing up
- Bowing – Social gesture of lowering the torso and head
