= Prostrate =

Prostrate may refer to:-

- Prostration, a position of submission in religion etc.
- Prone position, a face-down orientation of the body
- Prostrate shrub, a plant with a trailing habit
