= Proskynesis =

Expression of respect

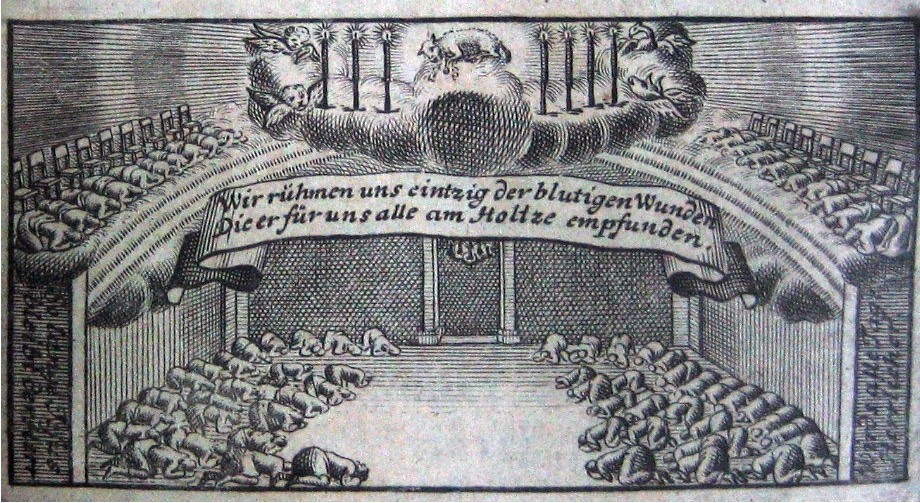
Moravians performing proskynesis during Christian worship in 1735

Proskynesis (/ˌprɒskɪˈniːsɪs/), also called proscynesis (/ˌprɒsɪˈniːsɪs/) or proskinesis (/ˌprɒskɪˈniːsɪs/; Greek: προσκύνησις proskýnēsis; Latin: adoratio), was a solemn gesture of respect towards gods and people in many societies. Among the Persians, it referred to a man prostrating himself and kissing the hand or the limbs of a respected person. It was also one of the religious rites among both Greeks and Romans.

In Byzantine society, it was a common gesture of supplication or reverence. The physical act ranged from full-fledged prostration or alternatively genuflection, a bow, or a simple greeting that concretized the relative positions of performer and beneficiary within a hierarchical order (τάξις táxis).

== Etymology ==
The Greek word προσκύνησις is derived from the verb προσκυνέω, proskyneo, itself formed from the compound words πρός, pros (towards) and κυνέω, kyneo ([I] kiss). It describes an attitude of humbling, submission, or worship – particularly towards a sovereign ruler, God or the gods.

== Practice ==
According to Herodotus in his Histories, a person of equal rank received a kiss on the lips; someone of a slightly lower rank gave a kiss on the cheek; and someone of a very inferior social standing had to completely bow down to the other person before them. To the Greeks, giving proskynesis to a mortal was seen as barbaric and ludicrous. In his Anabasis (3.2.13), Xenophon cites the Greek refusal to perform proskynesis as a sign of their freedom distinguishing them from the Persians: "As tokens of these victories [over Xerxes's invasion] we may, indeed, still behold the trophies, but the strongest witness to them is the freedom of the states in which you were born and bred; for to no human creature do you pay homage as master, but to the gods alone [οὐδένα γὰρ ἄνθρωπον δεσπότην ἀλλὰ τοὺς θεοὺς προσκυνεῖτε]."

=== Applications ===
The Persian custom may have led some Greeks to believe that they worshipped their king as a god, the only person who received proskynesis from everyone, and other misinterpretations caused cultural conflicts. Proskynȇsis was not a specific custom of the Achaemenid court alone, since it was practiced earlier in the Assyrian court. Contrary to the suggestions of Greek authors, Near Eastern sources leave no doubt that proskynȇsis did not have the character of a religious gesture, but was an element of the court ceremony.

Alexander the Great proposed this practice during his lifetime in adapting to the local customs of the Persian areas he conquered, but it was not accepted by his Greek companions (such as noted by the court historian, Callisthenes); he later did not insist on the practice. Most of his men could cope with Alexander's interest for having a Persian wardrobe, but honoring the king as if he was a god with proskynesis went a bit too far. According to Arrian, Callisthenes explains the existence of separated ways of honoring a god or a human and that prostration is a way to explicitly honor gods. It is seen as a threat to the Greeks, ‘who are men most devoted to freedom’. According to Callisthenes, prostration was a foreign and degrading fashion.

The emperor Diocletian (AD 284–305) is usually thought to have introduced the practice to the Roman Empire, forming a break with the Republican institutions of the principate, which preserved the form, if not the intent, of republican government. However, there is some evidence that an informal form of proskynesis was already practiced at the court of Septimius Severus. The political reason for this change was to elevate the role of the emperor from "first citizen" to an otherworldly ruler, remote from his subjects, thus reducing the likelihood of successful revolt, which had plagued the Empire during the preceding 50 years.

Certain forms of proskynesis, such as those which entailed kissing the emperor's breast, hands, or feet, were reserved to specific categories of officials. The audience granted to native or foreign delegations included multiple series of proskynesis at points marked by porphyry disks (omphalia) set in the floor. Until the 10th century at least, imperial ceremonial avoided proskynesis on Sundays out of reverence for the God. As a show of loyalty, proskynesis had strong political overtones; it recurs in imperial iconography and its importance in imperial ceremonial could sometimes raise delicate diplomatic dilemmas when foreign potentates were involved.

Similarly, the emperor was hailed no longer as "Imp(erator)" on coins, which meant "commander in chief" but as "D(ominus) N(oster)" – "Our Lord." With the conversion of Constantine, I to Christianity, proskynesis became part of an elaborate ritual, whereby the emperor became God's viceregent on earth. Titular inflation also affected the other principal offices of the Empire. Justinian I and Theodora both insisted on an extreme form of proskynesis, even from members of the Roman Senate, and they were attacked for it by Procopius in his Secret History.

== In Christianity ==
The verb προσκυνέω (proskyneo) is often used in the Septuagint and New Testament for the worship of pagan gods or the worship of the God of Israel. In addition, this word in some cases was used for the worship of angels.

As with the Greeks five centuries earlier, the practice was shocking but prevailed. With the conversion of Constantine to Christianity, it became part of an elaborate ritual, making the emperor "vice-regent of God on earth."

The question of the admissibility of proskynesis in relation to icons (bowing and kissing to icons) was raised in the 8th century during the period of iconoclasm. Opponents of proskynesis in relation to the icons referred to the second commandment of the Law of Moses:

"You shall not make for yourself a carved image any likeness of anything that is in heaven above, or that is in the earth beneath, or that is in the water under the earth; you shall not bow down (προσκυνήσεις) to them nor serve (λατρεύσῃς) them. For I, the LORD your God, am a jealous God."

One defender of proskynesis in relation to icons was John of Damascus. He wrote Three Treatises on the Divine Images in defense of the icons, in which he described several kinds of proskynesis. The first kind is the proskynesis of latreia (λατρεία), which people give to God, who alone is adorable by nature. John believed that only the first kind of proskynesis associated with latreia was forbidden by God. Other kinds of proskynesis: proskynesis performed in relation to saints and images of them (icons) are permitted by God.

In Christian theology, proskynesis denotes that simple veneration which is also permitted to saints, icons, etc., as opposed to latreia (worship), which is due only to triune God. Different authors translate the Greek word "προσκύνησις" from Christian texts into English differently: adoration, worship, veneration, bow, reverence.

"Greetings and respected proskynesis" (Greek: "ἀσπασμόν καί τιμητικήν προσκύνησιν"; Latin: "osculum et honorariam adorationem") for icons was established by the Second Council of Nicaea (Seventh Ecumenical Council) in 787.

== In the Book of Mormon ==
In the Church of Jesus Christ of Latter-day Saints, proskynesis occurs in a number of the narratives in the Book of Mormon.

== See also ==
- Kowtow
- Latria
- Pranāma
- Prostration
- Zemnoy poklon
