= Curtain call =

Acknowledgement of audience praise by a performer

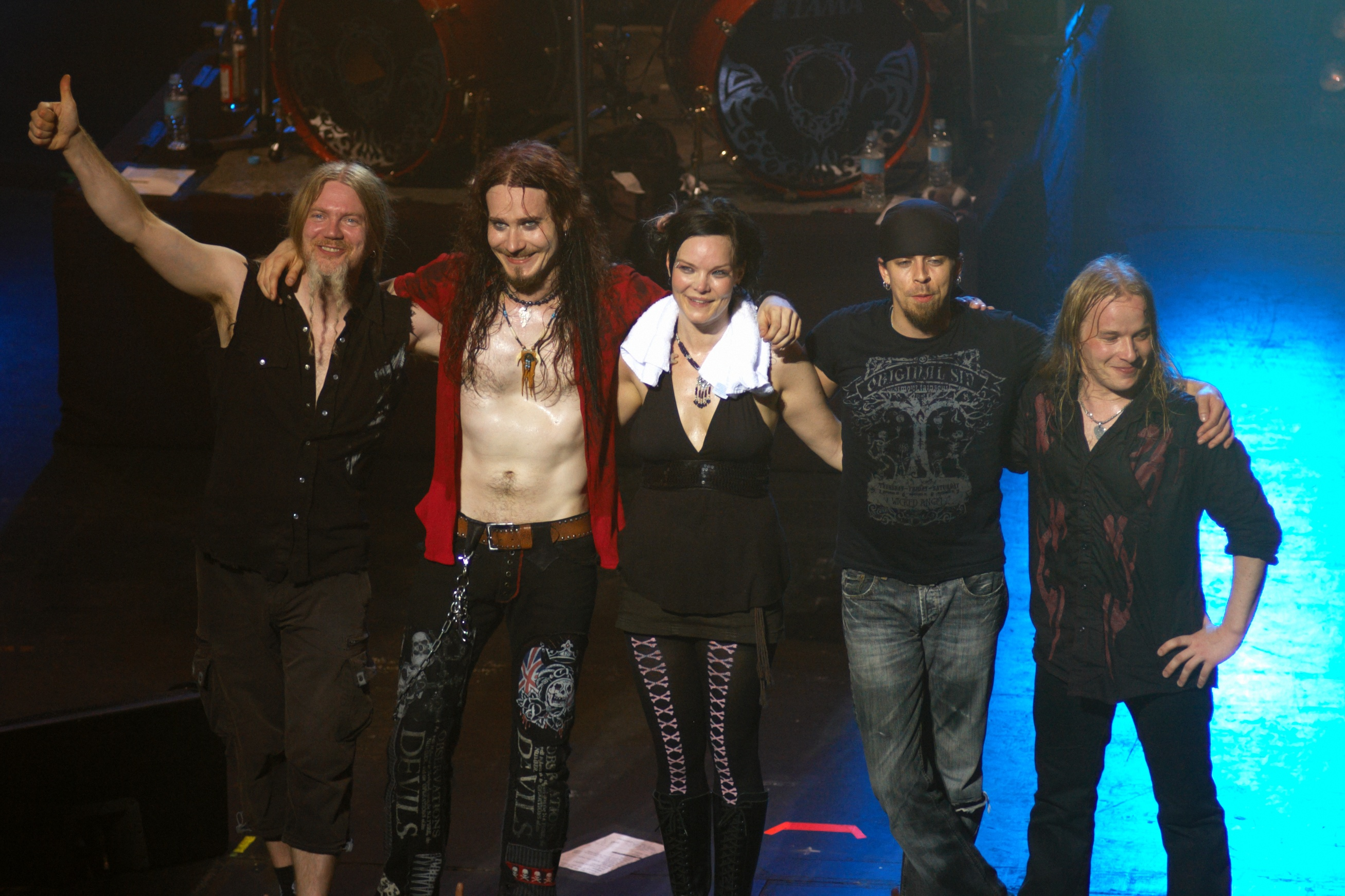
Curtain call from Nightwish at the conclusion of a show in Melbourne in 2008

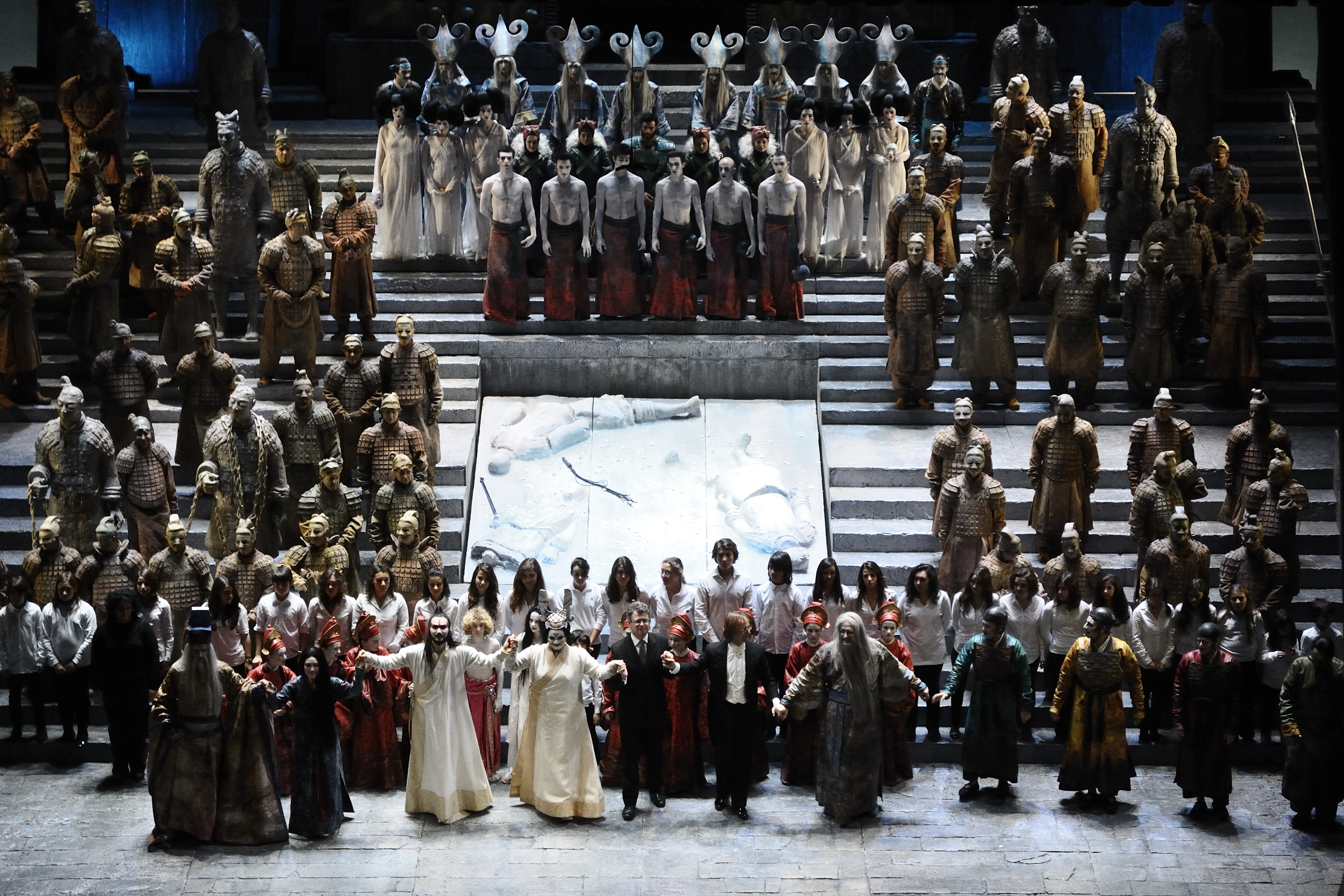
Turandot directed by Roberto De Simone. January 2012, Teatro Comunale Bologna

A curtain call (often known as a walkdown or a final bow) occurs at the end of a performance when one or more performers return to the stage to be recognized by the audience for the performance. In musical theatre, the performers typically recognize the orchestra and its conductor at the end of the curtain call. Luciano Pavarotti holds the record for receiving 165 curtain calls, more than any other artist, for his February 24, 1988, performance of Nemorino in Gaetano Donizetti's L'elisir d'amore.

== In film and television ==
In film and television, the term "curtain call" is used to describe a sequence at the end of the film and before the closing credits, in which brief clips, stills, or outtakes featuring each main character are shown in sequence with the actor's name captioned. This sequence results in a similar individual recognition of each actor by the audience as would occur in a stage curtain call. This is not common, but when seen is more common in films that are light-hearted and have many characters, or perhaps a long list of cameo appearances.

At the end of every episode of Little Einsteins, a “Curtain Call” segment is shown, followed by a “That’s So Silly” segment.

On occasion, long-running television series, particularly those filmed in front of a live audience, have featured a theater-style curtain call at the conclusion of their runs, with the cast breaking character and often showing the audience and crew. The Mary Tyler Moore Show series finale "The Last Show" was a notable example of this. The term has subsequently been associated with the series finale of a particular show.

== In sports ==
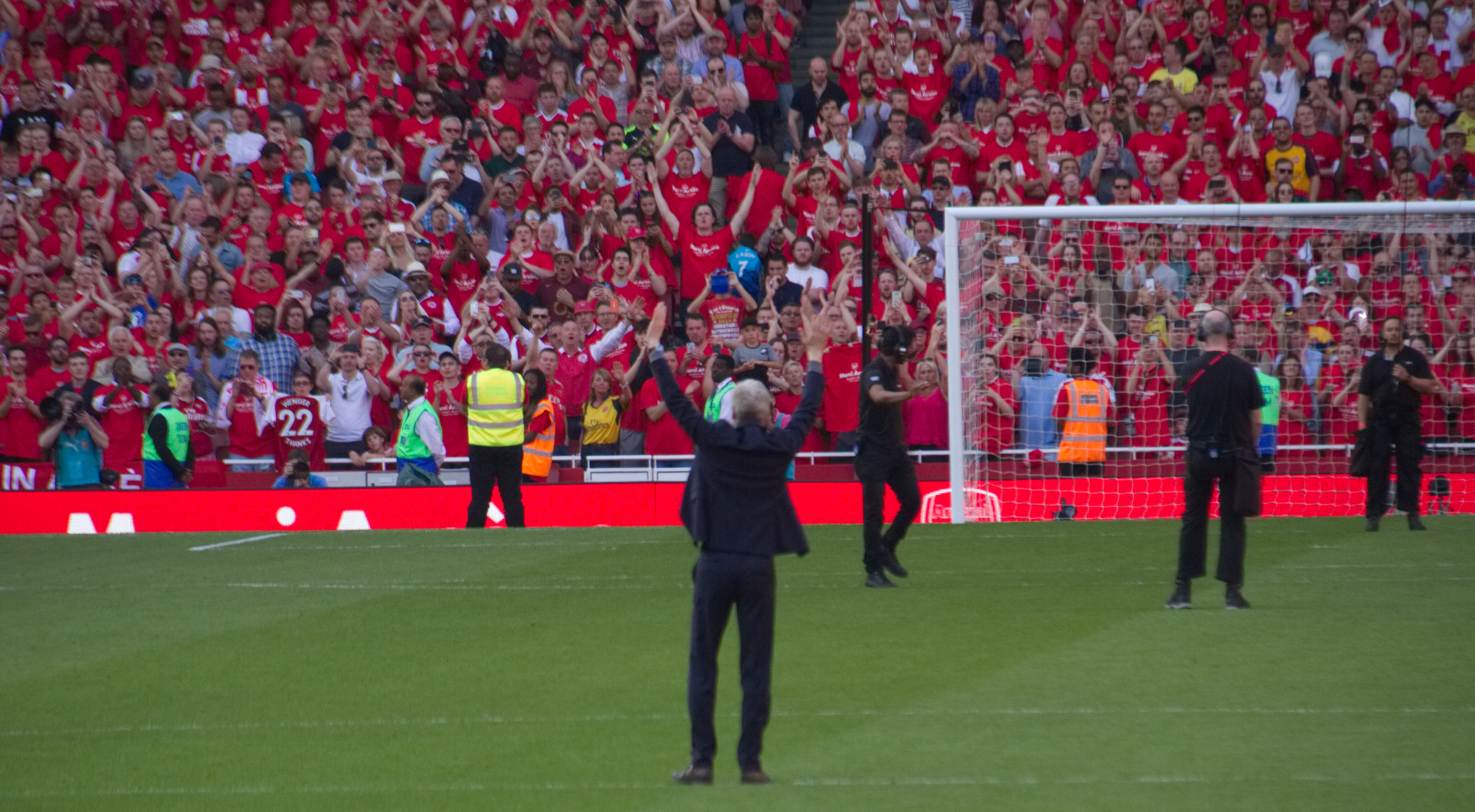
Arsène Wenger on the field of play at the conclusion of his final home game as manager of Arsenal F.C.

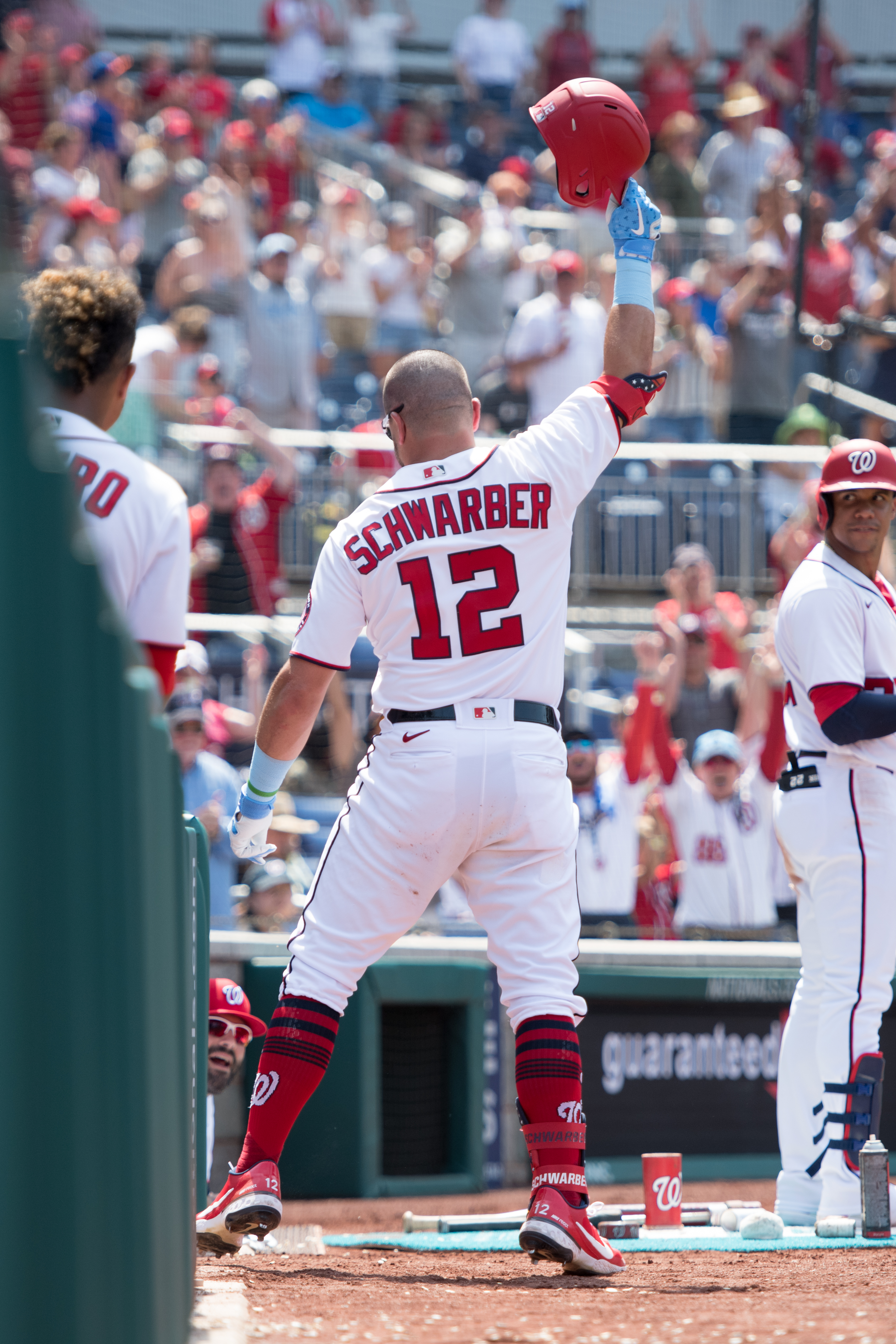
Kyle Schwarber emerging from the dugout to deliver a curtain call and tip his batting helmet to fans at Nationals Park

Athletes who also perform well may return to the field of play after a big play or at the conclusion of the game for recognition. Professional baseball players usually take their cap or helmet by the brim and hold it in the air. According to baseball historian Peter Morris, in May 1881 Detroit fans cheered a home run by Charlie Bennett until he bowed to them.

On October 3, 1951, after Bobby Thomson hit the pennant-winning home run for the New York Giants in the ninth inning of the third game of the National League playoff, jubilant Giants fans swarmed the playing field of the Polo Grounds, running after the triumphant Giant players, who raced towards the clubhouse which was located in center field. Author Joshua Prager, in his definitive volume of Thomson's homer The Echoing Green, wrote, "(T)housands of fans hungry for a curtain call stood now outside a green clubhouse chanting 'We want Thomson!' We want Thomson!'" Several minutes later (about 15 minutes after the actual home run), "word reached Thomson that he was wanted outside, that only a curtain call might dissipate the stubborn throng ... And so out Thomson went, wading through the packed clubhouse to its top outdoor step." The New York Times sportswriter John Drebinger called the crowd's response "the most frenzied 'curtain calls' ever afforded a ballplayer."
