= At attention =

Military posture

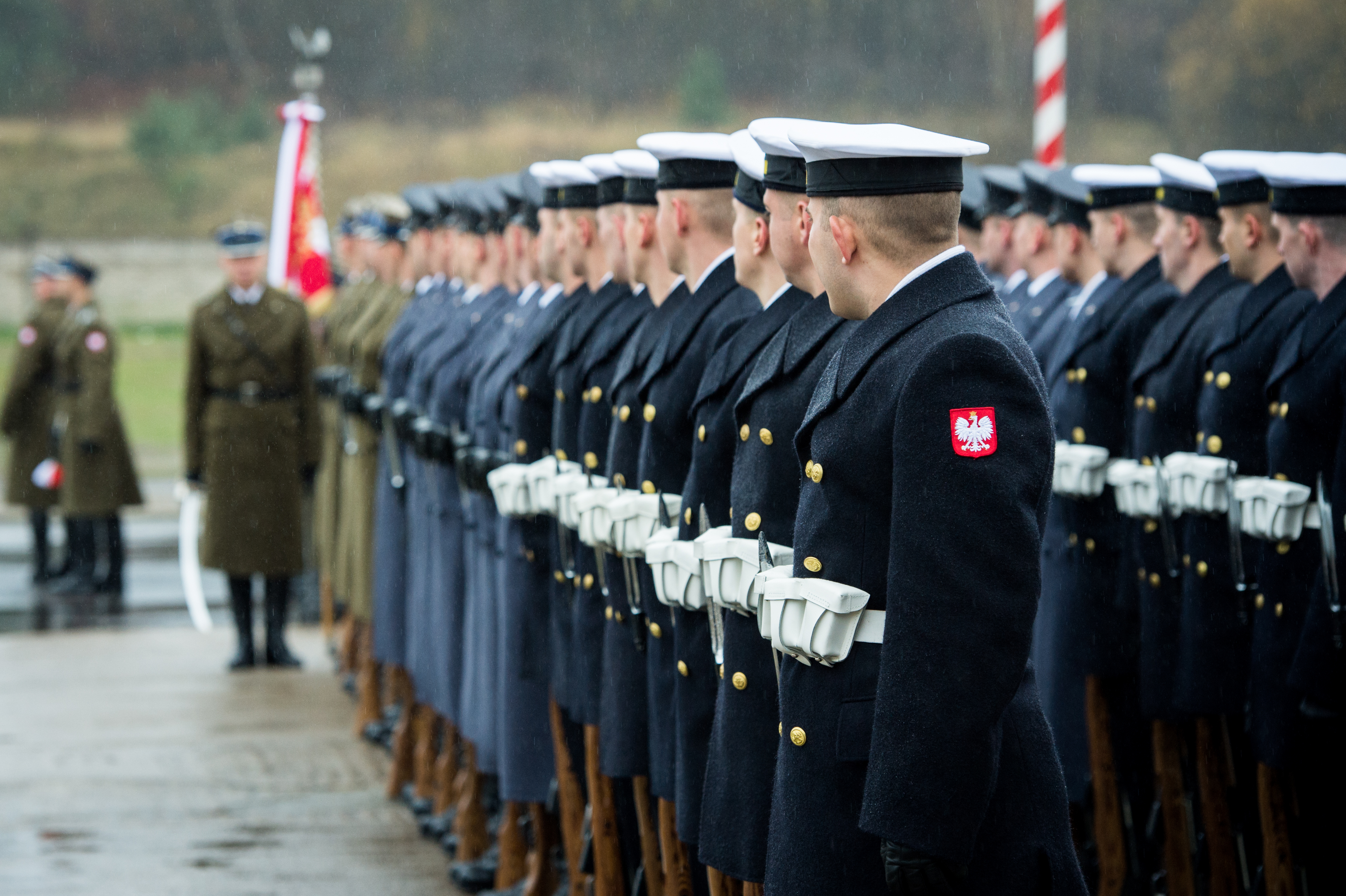
Polish soldiers standing at attention

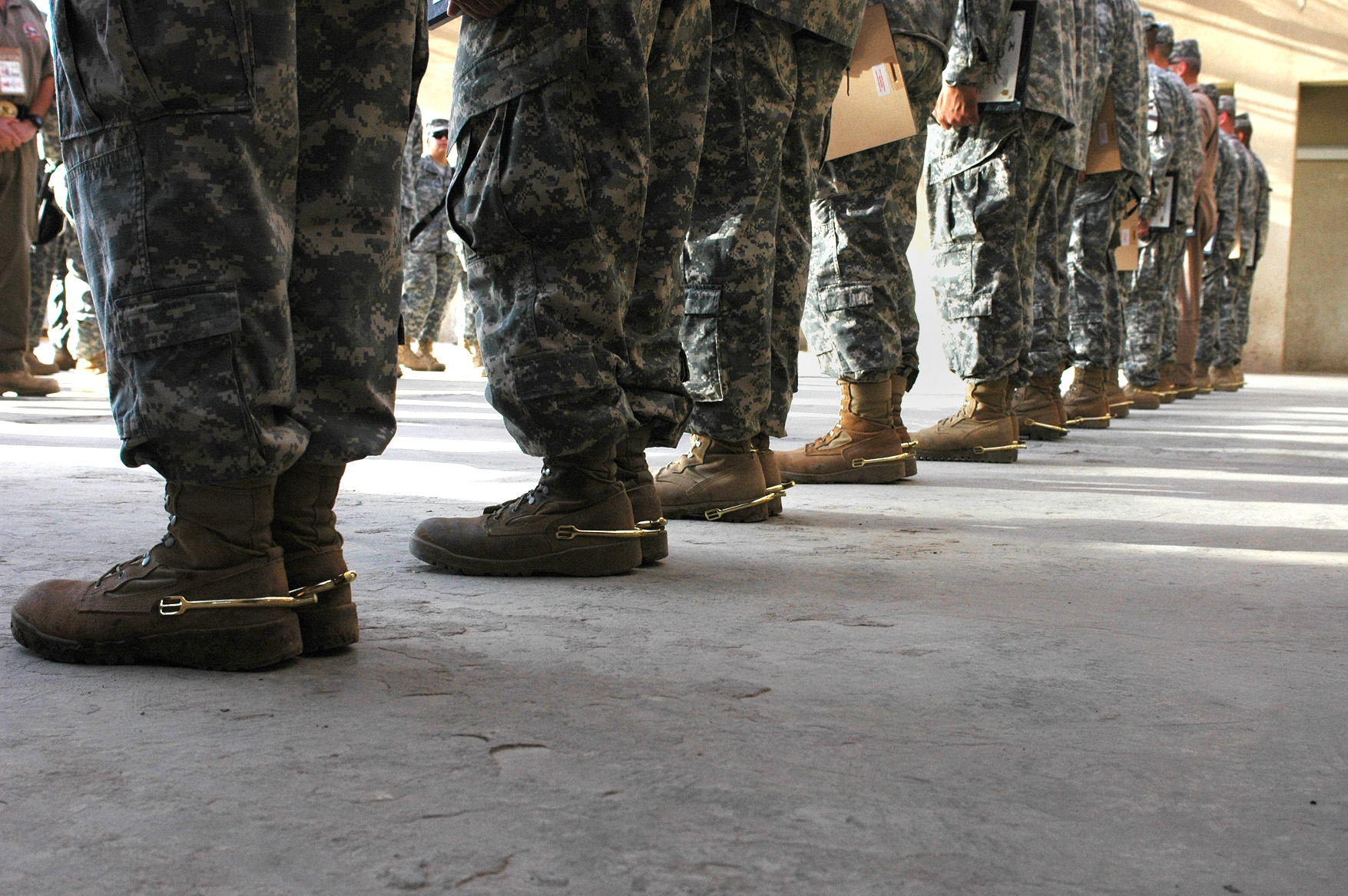
Soldiers from the US 1st Air Cavalry Brigade, 1st Cavalry Division standing at attention

The position of at attention, or standing at attention, is a military posture which involves the following general postures:

- Standing upright with an assertive and correct posture, described as "chin up, chest out, shoulders back, stomach in".
- Arms fixed at the side, thumb or middle finger parallel to trouser or skirt seam, depending on military drill specifics.
- "Eyes front": head and eyes locked in a fixed forward posture. Ideally eyes unmoving fixated on a distant object. Blank facial expression.
- Keeping the heels together, with the toes apart with the feet at a 45-degree angle.
- No speech, facial or bodily movements except when as required by military drill.

Attention bugle call
Attention bugle call

The above stance position is common in most military organizations throughout the world. It may also be adopted by paramilitary organizations, law enforcement, and other organizations requiring a loosely military structure such as Scouts, cadet programs, or police units, or even the Salvation Army.

It is also used in common in civilian marching bands, fife and drum corps and drum and bugle corps. To stand at attention is also a means of saluting when a junior rank meets an officer or superior, but the junior is not wearing a cover.

== By country ==
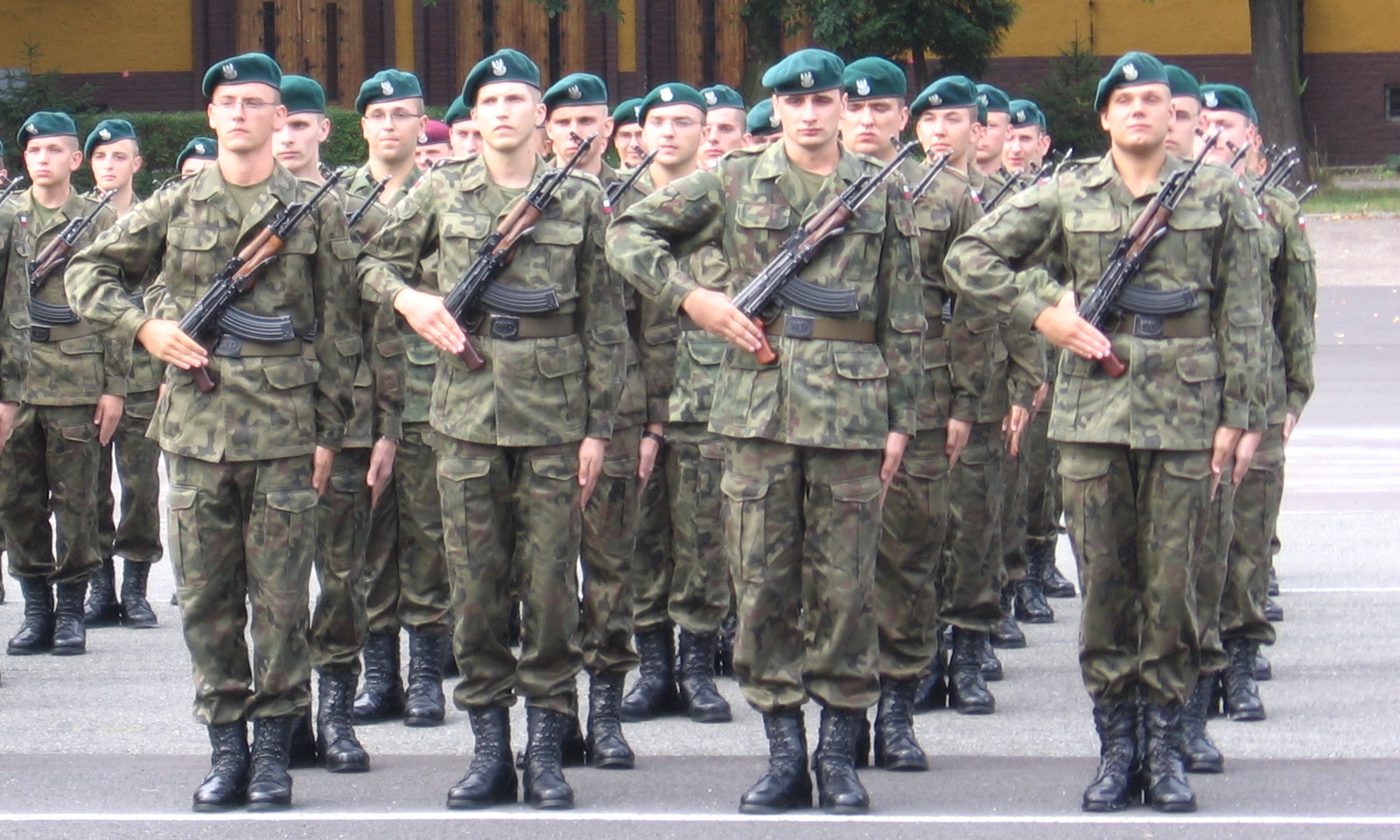
Recruits of Polish army standing at attention after their military oath

=== United Kingdom and British Commonwealth ===
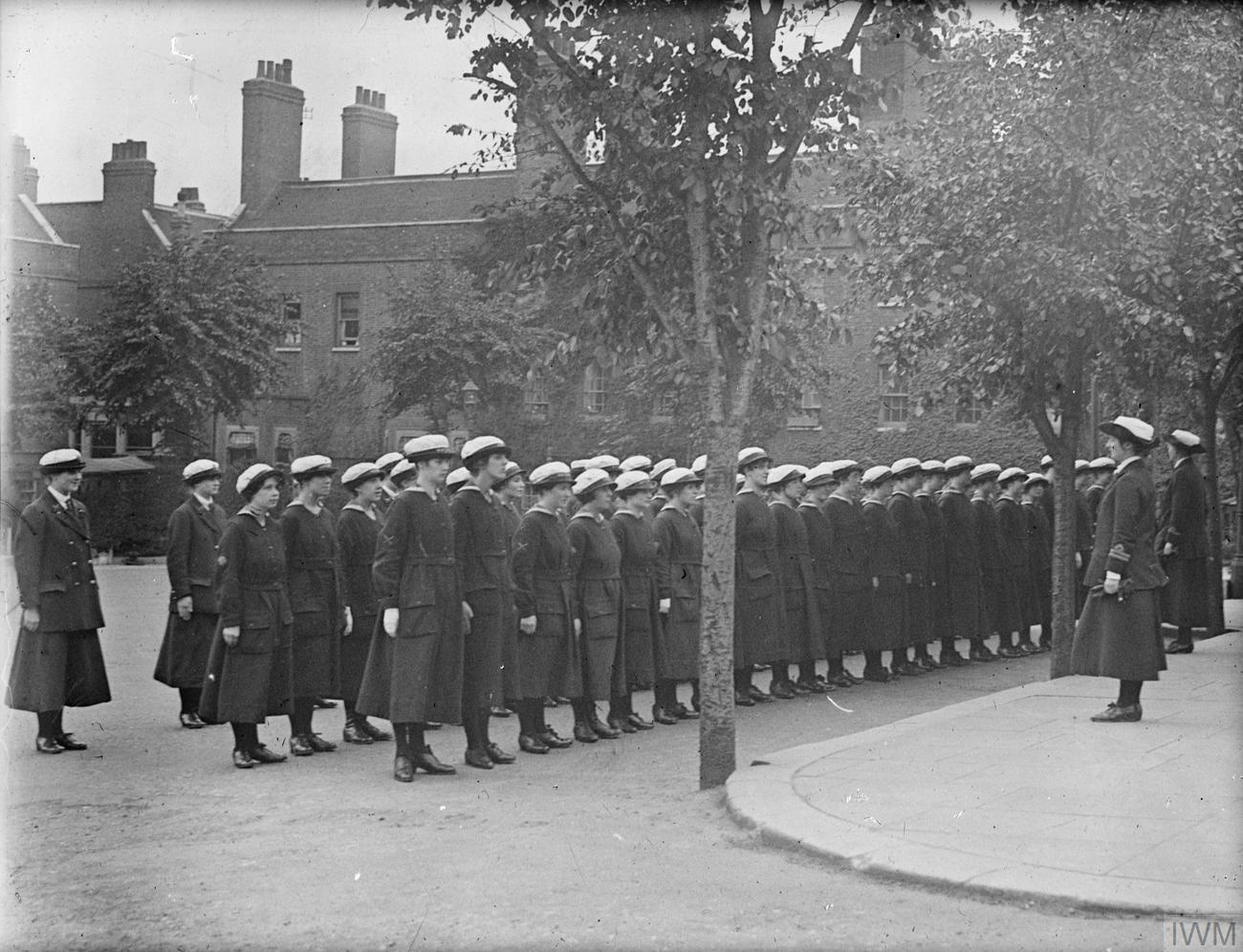
Ratings of the Women's Royal Naval Service standing at attention during World War I

In the United Kingdom, New Zealand Defence Force and Australian Defence Force, feet are at a 45-degree angle with heels together. In the Canadian forces, feet are at a 30-degree angle with heels together. Standing at attention is also a critical component of any audience when the Canadian national anthem (O Canada) is being played. It is considered very disrespectful to not stand at attention while O Canada is being played.

=== Russia and Commonwealth of Independent States ===
In Russia and countries of Soviet influence, on the command of attention (Russian: Смирно; Smer-nah), the soldiers of any sized unit snap their heads to the front, with their chin up and looking straight ahead.

=== Spain ===
In the three armies of Spain this order must be given after the aling up. When the drill gives the order, the soldiers, who must be in the aling up posture, snap their heads to the left and, after the executive order «¡Mar!» or «¡Ar!» they lower the arm that would have been extended to keep the distance with the soldier in front, keeping both arms at sides of the torso. When soldiers are in uniform, the fists must be clenched, covering the gap between the index finger with the thumbs, keeping the knuckles against the legs. If the soldiers are in civilian or sports clothing, the arms are held the same, but the hands are held open and must slap the leg when the executive order is given.

=== United States ===
In the United States military, the feet are at a 45-degree angle with heels together and the fingers are curled in a loose fist. Contrary to the norm of the chin being up, the chin is instead down and the neck vertical.

=== Other nations ===
- Finnish Army, the distance between the toes should equal the width of two fists.
- Polish Army and Turkish Army, the distance between the halluces of the feet should equal the soldier's foot's length.
- Swiss Armed Forces, the feet are kept at a 60-degree angle with the heels together.
- Swedish Army, Navy and Air Force, the hands are kept clenched, as a sign of readiness to fight.
- Scouts refer to this position as "at alert".

== See also ==
- Military parade
- Drill commands
