= Bowing =

Social gesture of lowering the torso and head

"Bowing" from Home Life in Tokyo (1910) by Jukichi Inouye; politeness is taught from an early age in Japanese homes.

Bowing (also called stooping) is the act of lowering the torso and head as a social gesture in the direction of another person or symbol. It is most prominent in Asian cultures but it is also typical of nobility and aristocracy in many European countries. It is also used in religious contexts, as a form of worship or veneration. Sometimes the gesture may be limited to lowering the head such as in Indonesia, and in many cultures several degrees of the lowness of the bow are distinguished and regarded as appropriate for different circumstances. It is especially prominent in Nepal, India, Cambodia, Thailand, Laos, Vietnam, China, Korea, and Japan, where it may be executed standing or kneeling. Some bows are performed equally by two or more people, while others are unequal – the person bowed to either does not bow in return or performs a less low bow in response. A nod of the head may be regarded as the minimal form of bow; forms of kneeling, genuflection, or prostration which involves the hands or whole body touching the ground, are the next levels of gesture.

== In Europe and the Commonwealth ==
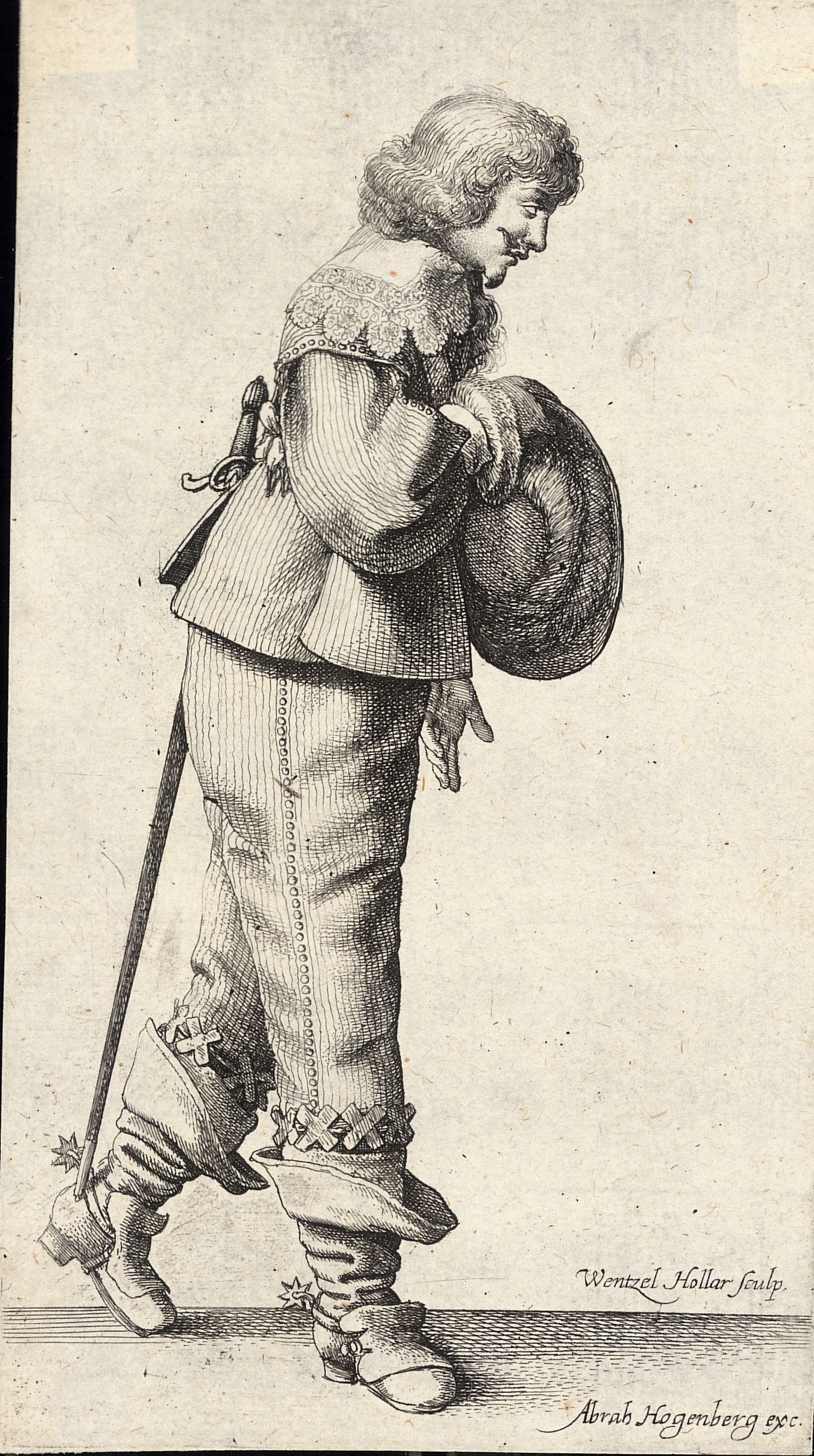
Man bowing

Bowing is a traditional gesture of respect and gratitude in European cultures. Since the 17th century, bowing has been a primarily male practice. Women may instead perform a curtsy, a related gesture that diverged from the bow during the early modern period. However, women may still bow in some religious practices or during stage performances, such as at the curtain call.

The depth of the bow related to differences in rank or degree of respect or gratitude. In early-modern courtly circles, males were expected to "bow and scrape" (hence the term "bowing and scraping" for what appears to be excessive ceremony). "Scraping" refers to the drawing back of the right leg as one bows, such that the right foot scrapes the floor or earth. Typically, while executing such a bow, the man's right hand is pressed horizontally across the abdomen while the left is held out from the body. Today, social bowing is all but extinct, except in some very formal settings. However, hand-kissing of women by men, which entails bowing to reach the hand, continues in some cultures.

In the British, Australian, and other Commonwealth courts, lawyers and clerks (of both genders) are expected to perform a cursory bow of the head only to the judge when entering or leaving a law court that is in session. Similar gestures are made to the Speaker of the House of Commons when entering or leaving the chamber of the House of Commons in session, and to the monarch by staff.

Members of the Royal Family of the various Commonwealth Realms receive either bows or curtsies, depending on the gender of the royal personage. Australians are expected to bow to the Governor-General of Australia, the spouse of the Governor-General and state Governors and Lieutenant-Governors.

== In the United States ==
The convention of a bow as greeting carried over from Europe to the United States. While President George Washington used it as a gesture of greeting, it has largely been replaced by other gestures, particularly the handshake, since the early 1800s. In the United States, bows are most commonly now done during curtain calls.

== In Asia ==
=== In East Asia ===
Students wearing suits, hakama and kimono bow to the president of the school and then to the audience at the 2015 Waseda University graduation ceremony in Japan.

Bows are the traditional greeting in East Asia, particularly in Japan, Korea, Hong Kong, China and Vietnam. In China and Vietnam, shaking hands or a slight bow has become more popular than a full bow. However, bowing is not reserved only for greetings; it can also be used as a gesture of respect, with different bows used for apologies and gratitude.

==== In China ====
The kowtow is the highest sign of reverence in Han Chinese culture, but its use has become extremely rare since the collapse of Imperial China. In many situations, the standing bow has replaced the kowtow. However, in modern Chinese societies, bowing is not as formalized as in Japan, South Korea and North Korea. Bowing is normally reserved for occasions such as marriage ceremonies and as a gesture of respect for the deceased, although it still sometimes used for more formal greetings. In China, three bows are customarily executed at funerals, including state funerals, ancestral worship, and at special ceremonies in commemoration of pater patriae Sun Yat-sen.

As in Japan and Korea, public figures may bow formally to apologize. Chinese Premier Wen Jiabao bowed and offered his condolences to stranded railway passengers; Taiwanese Defense Minister Chen Chao-min bowed in apology following a faux pas concerning the shooting of former President Chen Shui-bian in 2004.

=== In South and Southeast Asia ===
Similarly to East Asia, bowing is the traditional form of greeting in many South Asian and Southeast Asian countries. A gesture known as the Añjali Mudrā is used as a sign of respect and greeting and involves a bow of varying degrees depending on whom one performs it to and hands pressed together generally at chest level. Practised throughout South Asia and Southeast Asia, the gesture is most commonly used in India, Sri Lanka, Nepal, Bhutan, Bangladesh, Cambodia, Thailand, Laos, Myanmar and Indonesia. Gestures across the region are known by different names such as the sampeah in Cambodia, wai in Thailand, sembah in Indonesia, namaste in India and Nepal, and in Sri Lanka the gesture is used as a greeting with the word "Ayubowan"

== In religious settings ==
=== Eastern religions ===
In many Eastern religions bowing is used as a sign of respect in worship and has its origins in the Indian "Añjali Mudrā".

==== Sikhism ====
Sikhs only bow to their Gurus, who were the messengers of God. Their holy book, the Guru Granth Sahib, is seen as the eternal guru after the death of their living gurus, as it contains the word of god written by past living gurus. In a Gurdwara, Sikhs bow to the Guru Granth Sahib and are not permitted to take part in idol-worshiping, bowing to anything other than the Guru Granth Sahib, or bowing to any living person.

==== Shinto ====
Bows are performed in Shinto settings. Visitors to a Shinto shrine will clap or ring a bell to attract the attention of the enshrined deity, clasp the hands in prayer, and then bow.

==== Buddhism ====
Bowing is a common feature of worship in Buddhism. Zen Buddhism, for example, has a daily ritual in which practitioners do 1,080 full prostration bows, usually spread throughout the day. More casual practitioners and laypeople typically do 108 bows once a day instead.

==== Hinduism ====
In Hindu traditions, people show deference by bowing or kneeling and touching the feet of an elder or respected person. Traditionally, a child is expected to bow to their parents, teachers, and elders during formal ceremonies and casual settings.

=== Abrahamic religions ===
==== Judaism ====
In the Jewish setting, bowing, as in Christianity, is a sign of respect and is done at certain points in Jewish services. By tradition, in the Temple in Jerusalem, kneeling was part of the regular service, but this is not part of a modern Jewish service.

Some bows within the current liturgy are simple bows from the waist — others (especially during parts of the Amidah) involve bending the knees while saying Baruch (Blessed), bowing from the waist at Atah ([are] you) and then straightening up at Adonai (God). During the concluding Aleinu section of the services, congregants usually bow when they say "V'anachnu kor'im u'mishtachavim u'modim," meaning "we bend our knees, prostrate, and acknowledge our thanks." Another moment in the service that triggers the bow is during the "Bar'chu". Many bow at the mention of "Adonai" (the Jewish form of address for the Lord) at this and other parts of the service (most likely if they are to remain standing during that prayer).

Kneeling is retained in modern Orthodox Judaism, but only on the High Holy Days — once on each day of Rosh Hashanah (when the Aleinu prayer is recited during the Amidah), and four times on Yom Kippur — again, once for Aleinu, and three times during a central portion of the service when the details of the Avodah, the High Priest's service in the Temple are recited.

The Talmudic texts, as well as writings of Gaonim and Rishonim, indicate that total prostration was common among many Jewish communities until some point during the Middle Ages. Members of the Karaite denomination practice full prostrations during prayers. Ashkenazi Jews prostrated during Rosh Hashana and Yom Kippur, as did Yemenite Jews during the Tachanun part of regular daily Jewish prayer, until somewhat recently. Ethiopian Jews traditionally prostrated during a holiday specific to their community known as Sigd. Sigd comes from a root word meaning prostration in Amharic, Aramaic, and Arabic. There is a move among Talmide haRambam, a small modern restorationist group with perspectives on Jewish law similar to that of Dor Daim, to revive prostration as a regular part of daily Jewish worship.

==== Christianity ====
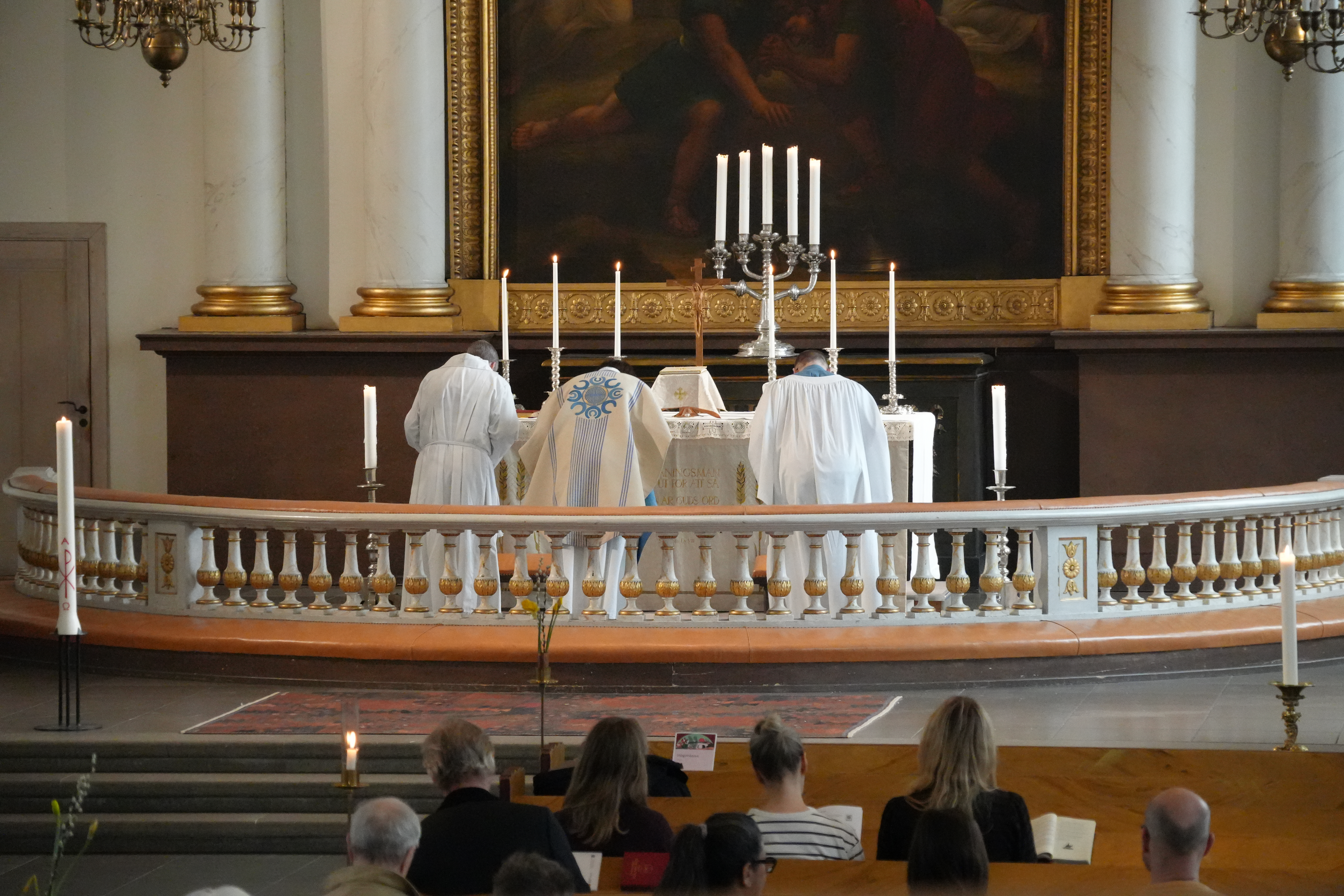
Two priests of Church of Sweden and one acolyte bow towards the high altar during the offering of the Holy Mass at Kungsholm Evangelical-Lutheran Church, part of the Diocese of Stockholm

Communicants of many Christian denominations bow at the mention of the name of Jesus, while inside a church and outside of one. The origin of this practice is within Sacred Scripture, which states: "Therefore God also highly exalted Him and gave Him the name that is above every name, so that at the name of Jesus every knee should bend, in heaven and on earth and under the earth" (NRSV). This pious custom was mandated in the Second Council of Lyon, which proclaimed "Whenever that glorious name is recalled, especially during the sacred mysteries of the Mass, everyone should bow the knees of his heart which he can do even by a bow of his head." The eighteenth canon of the Church of England, mother Church of the Anglican Communion, made this external obeisance obligatory during the divine service, declaring:

"When in time of divine service the Lord JESUS shall be mentioned, due and lowly reverence shall be done by all persons present, as it has been accustomed; testifying by these outward ceremonies and gestures their inward humility, Christian resolution, and due acknowledgement that the Lord JESUS CHRIST, the true eternal Son of God, is the only Saviour of the world, in whom alone all the mercies, graces, and promises of God to mankind for this life, and the life to come, are fully and wholly comprised."

Likewise, in the Lutheran Churches, people are "to bow when the name of Jesus is mentioned", and in the Roman Catholic Church "at the mention of the name of Jesus, there is a slight bow of the head". John Wesley, the founder of the Methodist Churches, also taught the faithful "to bow at the Name of Jesus" and as a result, it is customary for Methodists to bow at the mention of His name, especially during the recitation of the Creed.

The faithful, in the Evangelical-Lutheran tradition, bow towards the processional cross and make the sign of the cross as it passes in processions, as a gesture of reverence to Jesus.

In Christian liturgy, bowing is a sign of respect or deference. In many Christian denominations, individuals will bow when passing in front of the altar, or at certain points in the service (for example, when the name of Jesus Christ is spoken, as mentioned above). It may take the form of a simple bow of the head, or a slight incline of the upper body. A profound bow is a deep bow from the waist, and is often done as a substitution for genuflection. In Eastern Orthodoxy, there are several degrees of bowing, each with a different meaning. Strict rules exist as to which type of bow should be used at any particular time. The rules are complicated and are not always carried out in all parishes.

In the Roman Rite of the Catholic Church, a profound bow, prostration, a slight bow of the head (during the Creed), genuflection, and kneeling are all prescribed in the liturgy at various points. In addition, there are two forms of genuflection, depending on whether or not the Blessed Sacrament is exposed on the altar or not. In addition to bowing at the mention of the name of Jesus, in the Anglican Communion, "A reverence in the form of a bow is made to an altar, because it is as it were God's throne, and in a manner represents Him." As with Anglican churches, in Lutheran and Methodist churches, when approaching the chancel, it is customary to bow towards the altar (or altar cross). The faithful, in the Evangelical-Lutheran tradition, bow towards the processional cross and make the sign of the cross as it passes in processions, as a sign of reverence to Jesus; the same is done in Anglican churches.

The offering of the Holy Mass at Vadstena Abbey Church (Evangelical-Lutheran) in Sweden

Conservative Protestant Christians, such as Brethren, Mennonite, and Seventh-day Adventists, practice kneeling during community prayer in church services. Until the mid-1900s, this was common practice among many Protestant Christian groups.

==== Islam ====
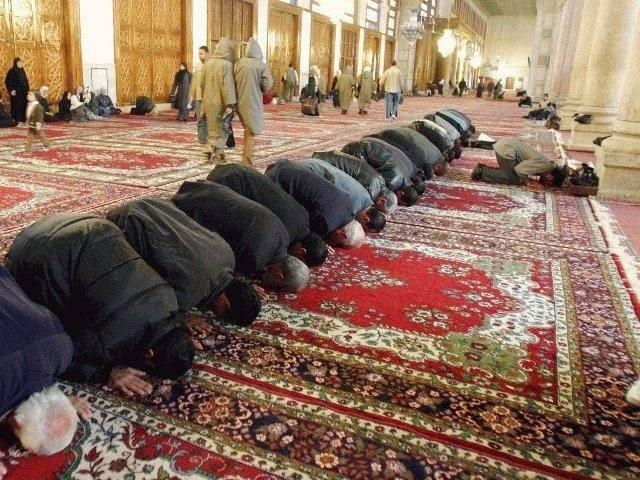
Muslim practitioners performing Sajdah or Sujud.

In Islam, there are two types of bowing, sujud and ruk'u. Sajdah or Sujud is to prostrate oneself to God in the direction of the Kaaba at Mecca, which is done during daily prayers (salat). While in sujud, a Muslim is to praise God and glorify him. The position involves having the forehead, nose, both hands, knees, and all toes touching the ground. Ruku' involves bowing down in the standing position during daily prayers (salat). The position of ruku' is established by bending over, putting one's hands on one's knees, and remaining in that position while also praising God and glorifying him.

== See also ==
- Curtsy
- Frontbend
- Proskynesis
- Congee
- Genuflection
- Kneeling
- Partial squatting
- Prostration
- Thai greeting—an example of a milder form of obeisance
