= Kungsholm Church =

Coordinates: 59.3289°N 18.0486°E

Kungsholms Church
- Ulrika Eleonora Church
- Kungsholms kyrka
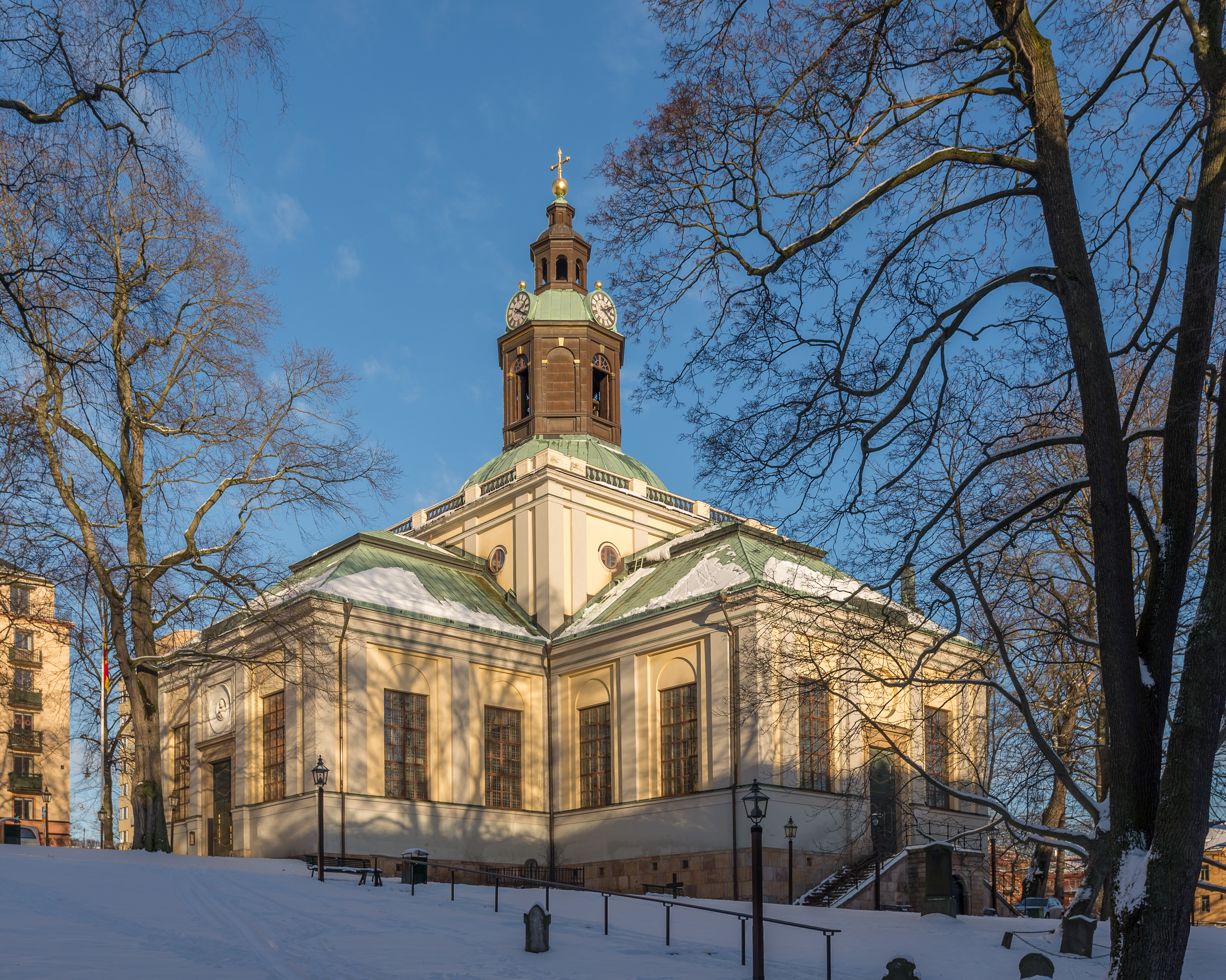
- Kungsholms Church in February 2015.
- Kungsholms Church
- Location: Kungsholmen
- Country: Sweden
- Denomination: Church of Sweden

History
- Consecrated: 12 December [O.S. 2 December] 1688}

Administration
- Diocese: Stockholm
- Parish: Västermalm

Kungsholm Church (Swedish: Kungsholms kyrka) or Ulrika Eleonora Church (Swedish: Ulrika Eleonora kyrka) is a church building at Bergsgatan on the island of Kungsholmen in Stockholm, Sweden. Belonging to the Västermalm Parish of the Church of Sweden, the church was inaugurated on 2 December 1688 (Old Style).

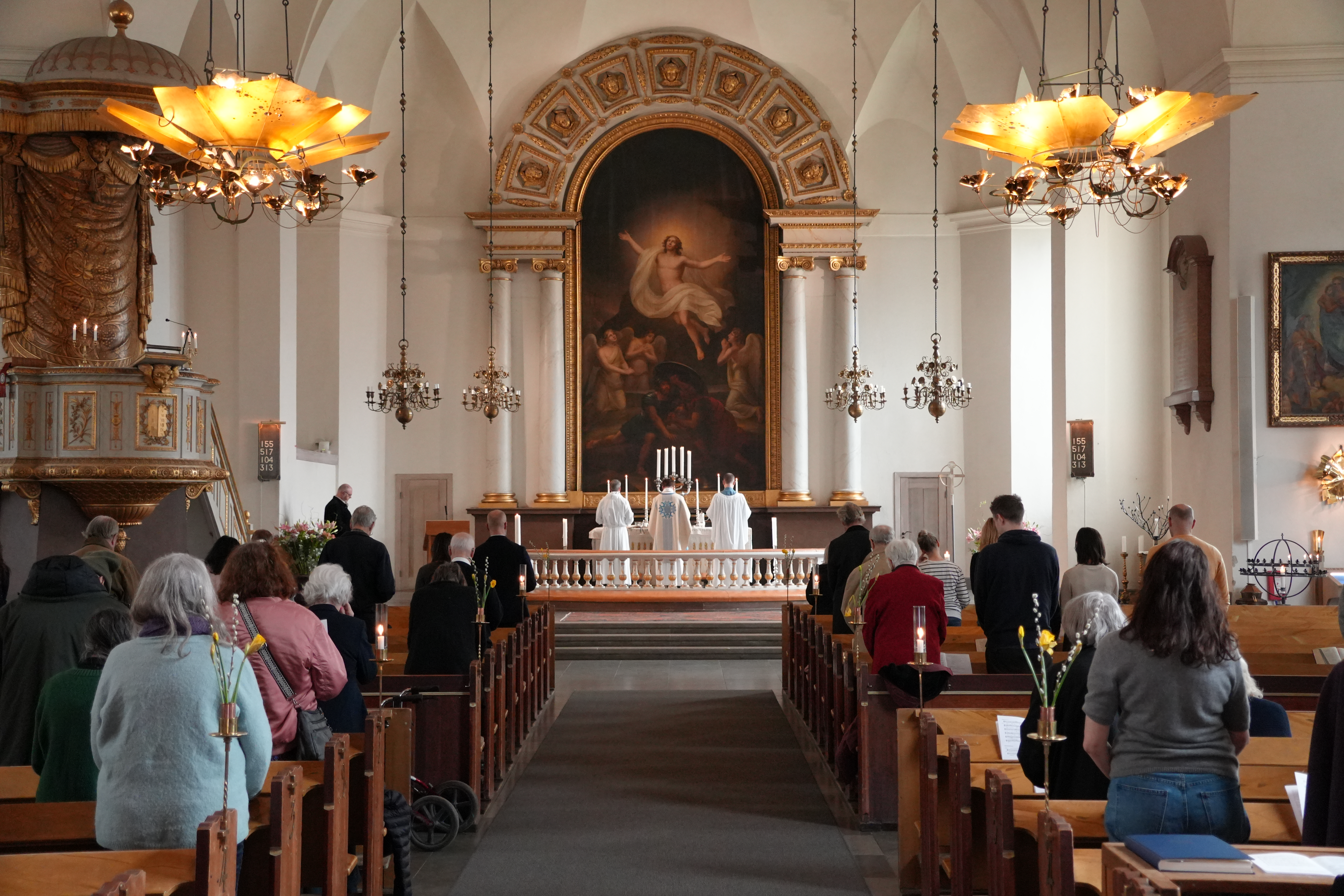
The church interior during the celebration of an Easter Monday mass
