= Prostration =

Reverential or submissive posture

Prostration is the gesture of placing one's body in a reverentially or submissively prone position. Typically prostration is distinguished from the lesser acts of bowing or kneeling by involving a part of the body above the knee, especially the hands, touching the ground.

Major world religions employ prostration as an act of submissiveness or worship to an entity or to the Supreme Being (i.e. God), as in the metanoia in Christian prayer used in the Eastern Orthodox and Oriental Orthodox Churches, and in the sujud of the Islamic prayer, salat. In various cultures and traditions, prostrations are similarly used to show respect to rulers, civil authorities and social elders or superiors, as in the Yoruba Idobale, Chinese kowtow or Ancient Greek proskynesis. The act has often traditionally been an important part of religious, civil and traditional rituals and ceremonies, and remains in use in many cultures.

== Traditional religious practices ==
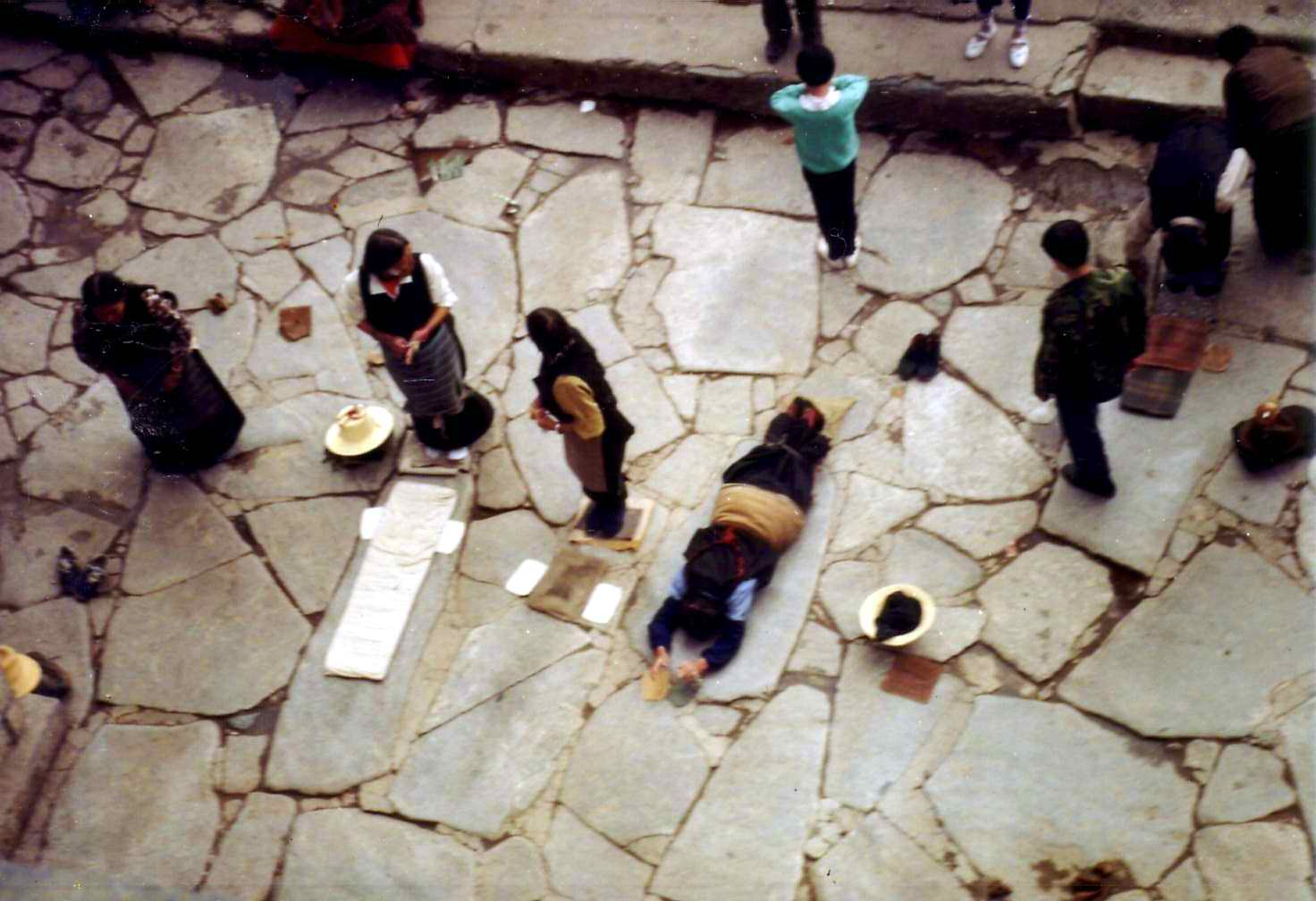
Buddhist pilgrims prostrating at the Jokhang.

Many religious institutions (listed alphabetically below) use prostrations to embody the lowering, submitting or relinquishing of the individual ego before a greater spiritual power or presence.

=== Baháʼí Faith ===
In the Baháʼí Faith, prostrations are performed as a part of one of the alternatives of obligatory prayer (the "Long" one) and in the case of traveling, a prostration is performed in place of each missed obligatory prayer in addition to saying "Glorified be God, the Lord of Might and Majesty, of Grace and Bounty". However, if unable to do so, saying "Glorified be God" is sufficient. There are specifics about where the prostration can take place including, "God hath granted you leave to prostrate yourselves on any surface that is clean ..." (note #10) and "He also condemns such practices as prostrating oneself before another person and other forms of behaviour that abase one individual in relation to another". (note #57)

=== Buddhism ===
In Buddhism, prostrations are commonly used and the various stages of the physical movement are traditionally counted in threes and related to the Triple Gem, consisting of:

- the Awakened One (Sanskrit/Pali: Buddha) (in this meaning, to own potential)
- his teaching (Sanskrit: Dharma; Pali: Dhamma)
- his community (Sangha) of noble disciples (ariya-savaka).

In addition, different schools within Buddhism use prostrations in various ways, such as the Tibetan tantric preliminary practice of a 100,000 prostrations as a means of overcoming pride (see Ngöndro). Tibetan pilgrims often progress by prostrating themselves fully at each step, then moving forward as they get up, in such a way that they have lain on their face on each part of their route. Each three paces involves a full prostration; the number three is taken to refer to the Triple Gem. This is often done round a stupa, and in an extremely arduous pilgrimage, Mount Kailash is circumnavigated entirely by this method, which takes about four weeks to complete the 52-kilometre route. It is also not unusual to see pilgrims prostrating all the way from their home to Lhasa, sometimes a distance of over 2000 km, the process taking up to two years to complete.

=== Christianity ===
White-clad deacon candidates prostrate before the altar of the Cathedral of Our Lady of the Angels in Los Angeles during their ordination liturgy

In Oriental Orthodox Christianity and Western Orthodox Christianity, believers prostrate during the seven fixed prayer times; prayer rugs are used by some adherents to provide a clean space for believers to offer their Christian prayers to God, e.g. the canonical hours. Oriental Orthodox Christians, such as Copts, incorporate prostrations in their prayers that are performed facing eastward in anticipation of the Second Coming of Jesus, "prostrating three times in the name of the Trinity; at the end of each Psalm … while saying the ‘Alleluia’; and multiple times" during the forty-one Kyrie eleisons" (cf. Agpeya). Additionally, Orthodox Coptsprostrate during certain points of the Eucharistic liturgy year-round, which appears to be a glorifying gesture focused on worship in eternity (doxological eschatology) exemplified in the prostrations of the Twenty-four elders of revelation (Rev 4:10). Syriac Orthodox and Indian Orthodox Christians, as well as Christians belonging to the Mar Thoma Syrian Church (an Oriental Protestant denomination), make multiple prostrations at the seven fixed prayer times during which the canonical hours are prayed, thrice during the Qauma prayer, at the words "Crucified for us, Have mercy on us!", thrice during the recitation of the Nicene Creed at the words "And was incarnate of the Holy Spirit...", "And was crucified for us...", & "And on the third day rose again...", as well as thrice during the Prayer of the Cherubim while praying the words "Blessed is the glory of the Lord, from His place forever!" (cf. Shehimo). Oriental Catholic and Oriental Protestant rites also use prostrations in a similar way as the Oriental Orthodox Churches.

Among Old Ritualists, a prayer rug known as the Podruchnik is used to keep one's face and hands clean during prostrations, as these parts of the body are used to make the sign of the cross.

The Catholic, Lutheran, and Anglican Churches use full prostrations, lying flat on the floor face down, during the imposition of Holy Orders, Religious Profession and the Consecration of Virgins. Additionally, in the Roman Catholic Church and United Methodist Church, at the beginning of the Good Friday Liturgy, the celebrating priest and the deacon prostrate themselves in front of the altar. Dominican practice on Good Friday services in priory churches includes prostration by all friars in the aisle of the church. In the Roman Catholic, Lutheran and Anglican churches, partial prostrations ("profound bows") can be used in place of genuflections for those who are unable to genuflect. The prostration is always performed before God, and in the case of holy orders, profession or consecration the candidates prostrate themselves in front of the altar which is a symbol of Christ.

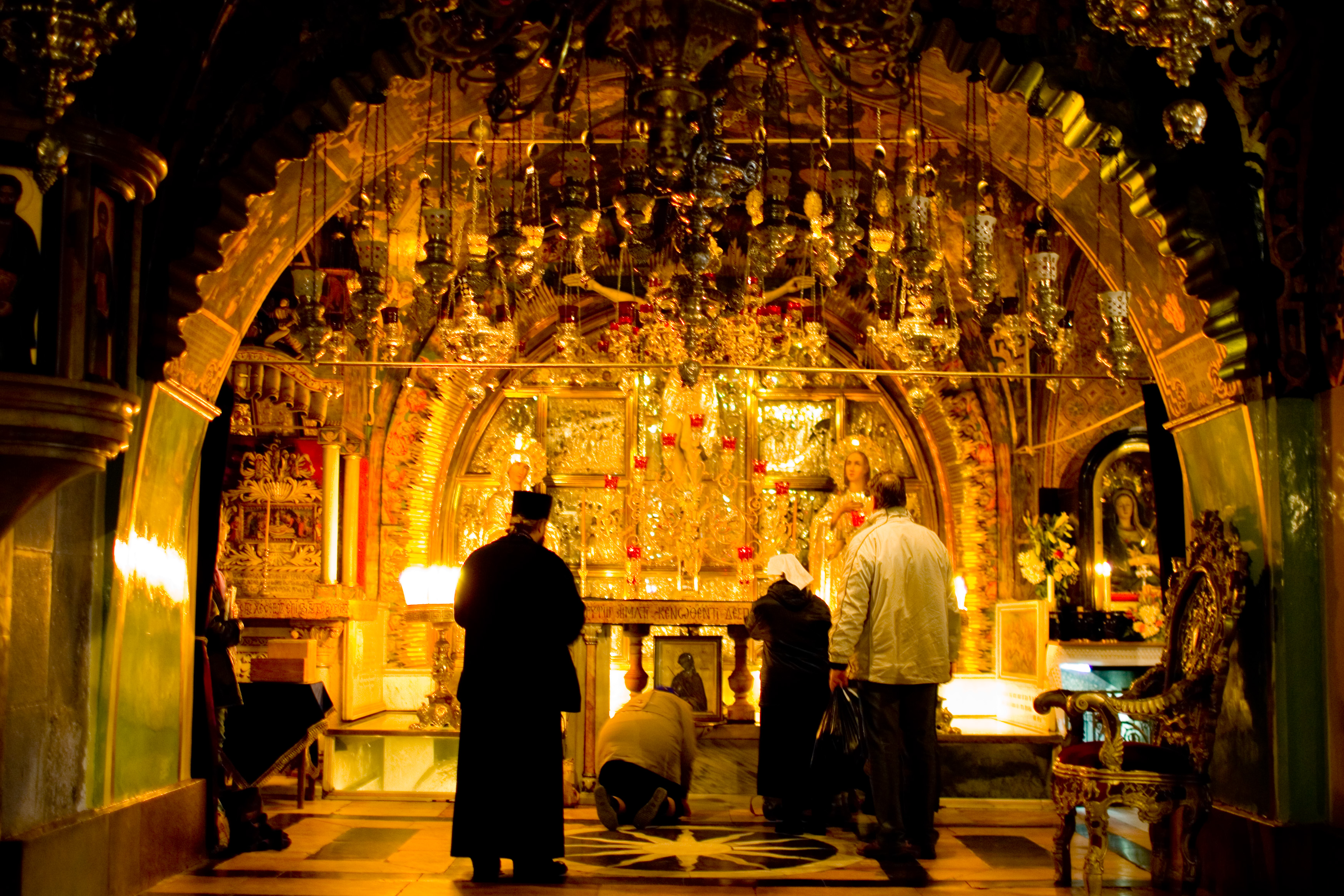
Eastern Orthodox pilgrims making prostrations at Golgotha in the Church of the Holy Sepulchre, Jerusalem.

In Eastern Orthodox Church, prostrations are preceded by making the sign of the cross and consist of kneeling and touching the head to the floor. They are commonly performed both at specific moments during the services and when venerating relics or icons. However, prostrations are forbidden on the Lord's Day (Sunday) and during Paschaltide (Easter season) in honour of the Resurrection and are traditionally discouraged on Great Feasts of the Lord. During Great Lent, and Holy Week, frequent prostrations are prescribed (see Prayer of St. Ephraim). Orthodox Christian may also make prostrations in front of people (though in this case without the Sign of the Cross, as it is not an act of veneration or divine worship), such as the bishop, one's spiritual father or one another when asking forgiveness (in particular at the Vespers service which begins Great Lent on the afternoon of the Sunday of Forgiveness.) Those who are physically unable to make full prostrations may instead substitute metanias (bows at the waist).

=== Hinduism ===
In Hinduism, eight-limbed (ashtanga pranama, also called dandavat, meaning "like a stick") and five-limbed (panchanga pranama) prostrations are included in the religious ritual of puja.

=== Islam ===
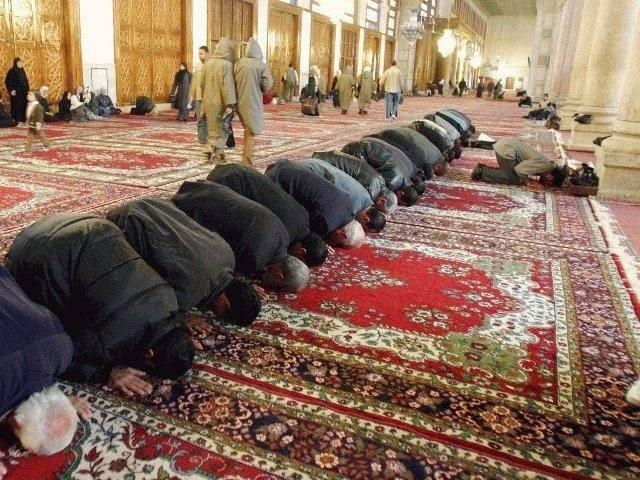
In Islam, sajadat (prostrations) occupy a quintessential position in the five obligatory (fardh) daily ritual prayers.

In Islam, prostrations (sajadat, plural of sujud or sajda) are used to praise, glorify and humble oneself in front of Allah (God) and are a vital part of the five obligatory prayers performed daily; this is deemed obligatory for every Muslim whether the prayers are being performed individually or in the congregation. Additionally, the thirty-second chapter (sura) of the Qur'an is titled As-Sajdah ("The Prostration": see 32:1 ^{(Translated by Yusuf Ali)}), while the Arabic word sujud (also meaning prostration) appears about 90 times in the Qur'an, a fact which many Muslim scholars claim to be another example of its significance in Islam.

According to a narration of the words and deeds of Muhammad as contained in the collection of hadith of Ibn Majah, Muhammad is reported to have said that "[t]he prayer [salah] is a cure for many diseases" and have advised people to perform prostration gracefully.

It is also important to note that in Islam, the prostration to anyone but Allah is absolutely forbidden as it constitutes shirk. Muhammad strictly prohibited Muslims from prostrating before him. Regardless of the circumstances, no Muslim should request or accept prostration from others, as prostration of anyone but Allah is strictly prohibited in Islam.There is an exception to this that is when the individual is forced or coerced

=== Jainism ===
In Jainism, there is a great importance placed on prostration, especially when a devotee is in the temples or in front of high souls. It represents the surrendering of ego.

=== Judaism ===
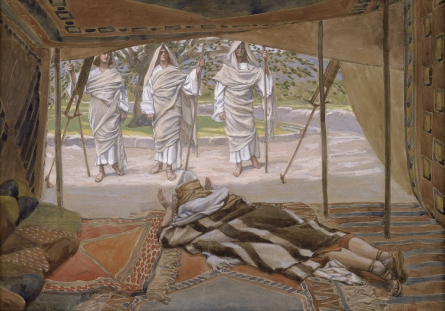
The prophet Abraham prostrates himself before three visitors (Genesis 18:2)

In Judaism, the Tanakh and Talmudic texts as well as writings of Gaonim and Rishonim indicate that prostration was very common among Jewish communities until some point during the Middle Ages. In the Book of Genesis, Abraham lay prostrate when God appeared to him to establish a covenant with him, in Genesis 17:3, and again in Genesis 17:17, and when three men visited him at the terebinths of Mamre.

In Mishneh Torah, Maimonides states that full prostration (with one's body pressed flat to the earth) should be practiced at the end of the Amidah, recited thrice daily. Members of the Karaite denomination practice full prostrations during prayers. Traditionally, Orthodox Ashkenazi Jews prostrated during Rosh Hashana and Yom Kippur, as did Yemenite Jews during the Tachanun part of daily Jewish prayer. Ethiopian Jews traditionally prostrated during a holiday specific to their community known as Sigd. Sigd comes from a root word meaning prostration in Ge'ez, Aramaic, and Arabic. There is a movement among Talmide haRambam to revive prostration as a regular part of daily Jewish worship.

Rabbinical Judaism teaches that when the High Priest spoke the Tetragrammaton in the Holy of Holies of the Temple in Jerusalem on Yom Kippur, the people in the courtyard were to prostrate themselves completely as they heard the name spoken aloud.

Judaism forbids prostration directly on a stone surface in order to prevent conflation with similar practices of Canaanite polytheists.

=== Sikhism ===
Sikhs prostrate in front of Guru Granth Sahib, the holy scripture of the Sikhs. Sikhs consider Guru Granth Sahib as their living Guru and the unchanging word of God: thus, by prostrating, Sikhs present their head to their Guru, awaiting command, which is taken in the form of a hukamnama, or a random opening of Guru Granth Sahib to reveal an edict for the individual or congregation (similar to the ancient Roman practice of sortes sanctorum, a form of bibliomancy). Sikhs call the prostration mutha tekna ("lowering the forehead"). Whenever and however many times a Sikh is in the presence of Guru Granth Sahib he will prostrate, usually upon the initial sight of Guru Granth Sahib and again upon leaving the presence of Guru Granth Sahib. Sikhs, in their personal worship (morning Nitnem and evening Rehras), will prostrate upon the completion of prayers and the ardās. The direction of prostration is not important as Sikhs place emphasis on the omnipresence of God: however, if it is possible, Sikhs tend to prostrate in the direction in which bani (books containing the word of God, such as the Gutka Sahib or Pothi Sahib) are kept. Other prostrations practiced by Sikhs from an Indian culture are touching of the feet to show respect and great humility (generally done to grandparents and other family elders). Full prostration is reserved for Guru Granth Sahib, as prostration is considered to be the ultimate act of physical humility and veneration.

== Other contexts ==
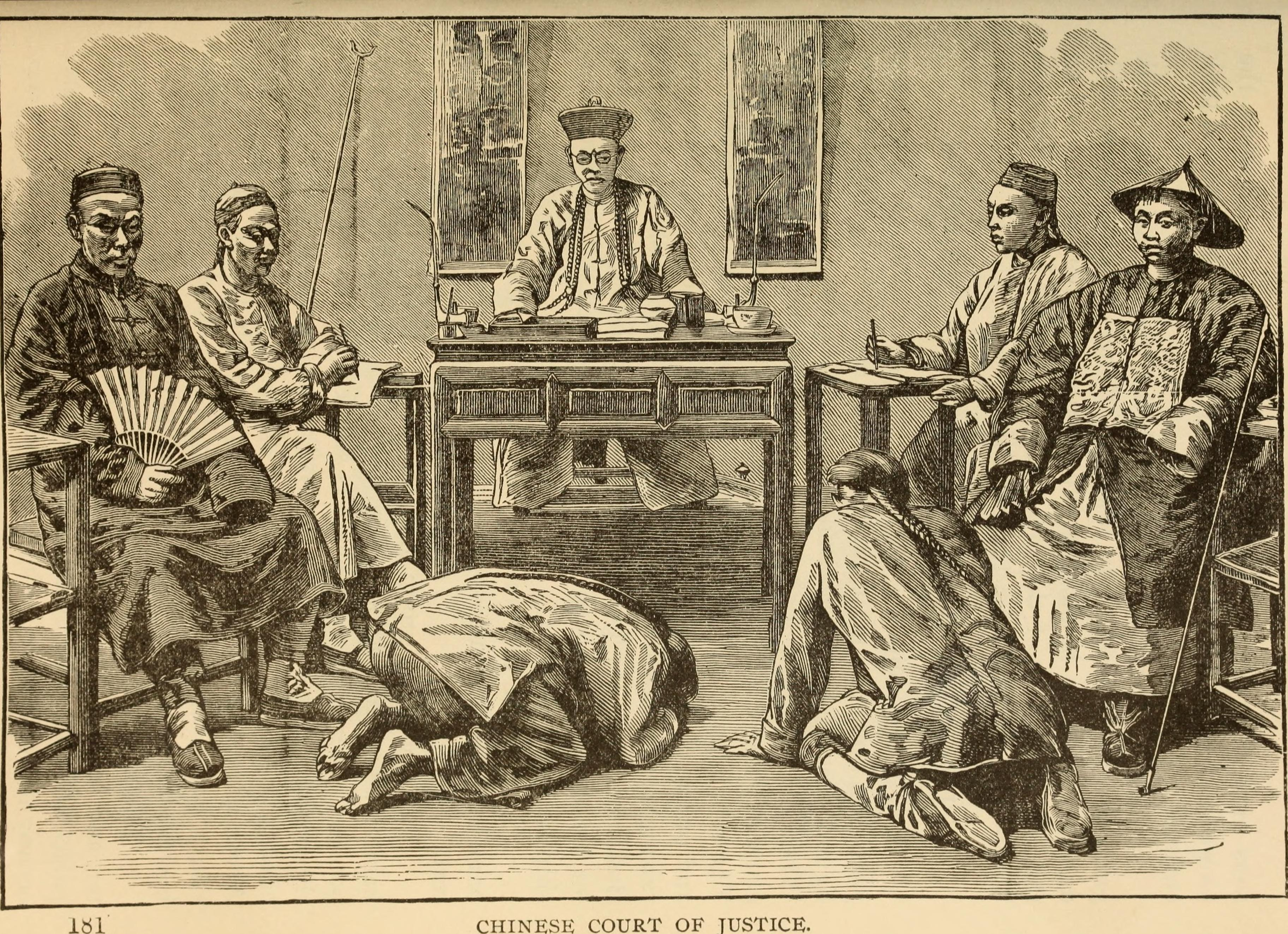
Kowtow in China

Outside of traditional religious institutions, prostrations are used to show deference to worldly power, in the pursuit of general spiritual advancement and as part of a physical-health regimen.

=== Hawaii ===
In ancient Hawaii, a form of prostration known as kapu moe required all to prostrate in the presence of a nīʻaupiʻo or a piʻo chief on the pain of death. The only people exempt from this were chiefs of the next grade the naha and wohi chiefs who were required to sit in their presence. Other Polynesian groups are known to practice this.

=== Imperial China ===
In Imperial China, a form of prostration inform ally known in English as a kowtow or kētou was used as a sign of respect and reverence.

=== Japan ===
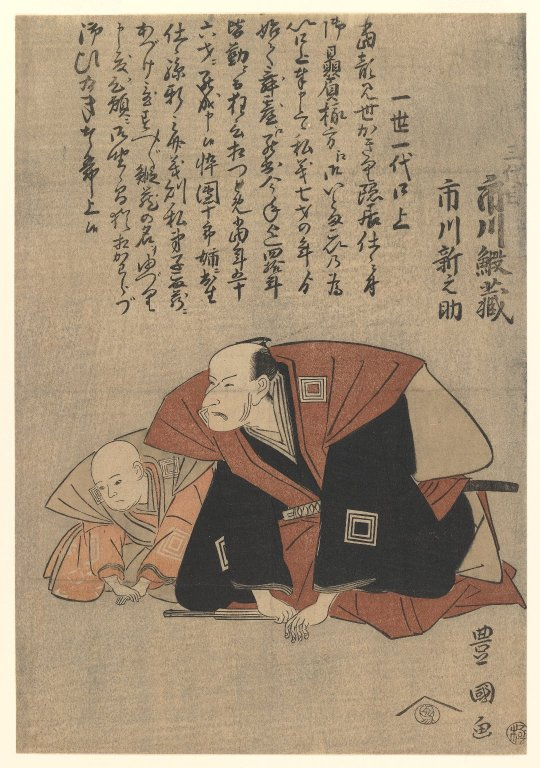
Actors prostrating in dogeza. The Actors, Ichikawa Ebizo III and Ichikawa Shinnosuke, woodblock color print by Toyokuni c. 1800.

In Japan, a common form of prostration is called dogeza, which was used as a sign of deep respect and submission for the elders of a family, guests, samurai, daimyōs and the Emperor. In modern times, it is generally used only in extreme circumstances, such as when apologizing for very serious transgressions or begging for an incredible favor.

To perform dogeza, a person first enters the sitting/kneeling position known as seiza, and then proceeds to touch the head to the ground. This practice may be related to rites of the Shinto religion and culture of Japan dating back centuries.

=== Martial arts ===
Shugyo in martial arts, particularly in the Shōtōkai and Kyokushin styles of Karate, it is a form of extreme spiritual discipline.

=== Yoga ===
In modern yoga practice, "sun salutations" (sūrya namaskāra) are a regular part of practitioners' routines. Such a practice may be used for both maintaining physical well-being and spiritual attainment.

=== Yoruba Ìdọ̀bálẹ̀ and Ìkúnlẹ̀ ===
In traditional and contemporary Yoruba culture, younger male family and community members greet elders by assuming a position called "ìdọ̀bálẹ̀". The traditional, full Yoruba prostration involves the prostrator lying down almost prone with his feet extended behind his torso while the rest of his weight is propped up on both hands. This traditional form is being replaced by a more informal bow and touching the fingertips to the floor in front of an elder with one hand, while bending slightly at the knee. The female form of the greeting is the "ìkúnlẹ̀", a form of kneeling where the younger party bows to one or both knees in front of an elder relative or community member. Both gestures are widely practiced; to not perform them would be considered ill-mannered.

Modified versions of both greetings are also common in traditional Yoruba religious and cultural contexts in the African diaspora, particularly in Brazil and Cuba.

== See also ==
- Bowing
- Genuflection
- Kowtow
- Salat
- Subordinate
- Zemnoy poklon
