= National Register of Historic Places listings in Washington County, Tennessee =

Location of Washington County in Tennessee

This is a list of the National Register of Historic Places listings in Washington County, Tennessee.

This is intended to be a complete list of the properties and districts on the National Register of Historic Places in Washington County, Tennessee, United States. Latitude and longitude coordinates are provided for many National Register properties and districts; these locations may be seen together in a map.

There are 36 properties and districts listed on the National Register in the county. One site has been further designated a National Historic Landmark. Four other sites were once listed, but have since been removed.

See also National Register of Historic Places listings in Carter County, Tennessee for additional properties in Johnson City, a city that spans the county line.

Contents: Counties in Tennessee
Anderson – Bedford – Benton – Bledsoe – Blount – Bradley – Campbell – Cannon – Carroll – Carter – Cheatham – Chester – Claiborne – Clay – Cocke – Coffee – Crockett – Cumberland – Davidson – Decatur – DeKalb – Dickson – Dyer – Fayette – Fentress – Franklin – Gibson – Giles – Grainger – Greene – Grundy – Hamblen – Hamilton – Hancock – Hardeman – Hardin – Hawkins – Haywood – Henderson – Henry – Hickman – Houston – Humphreys – Jackson – Jefferson – Johnson – Knox – Lake – Lauderdale – Lawrence – Lewis – Lincoln – Loudon – Macon – Madison – Marion – Marshall – Maury – McMinn – McNairy – Meigs – Monroe – Montgomery – Moore – Morgan – Obion – Overton – Perry – Pickett – Polk – Putnam – Rhea – Roane – Robertson – Rutherford – Scott – Sequatchie – Sevier – Shelby – Smith – Stewart – Sullivan – Sumner – Tipton – Trousdale – Unicoi – Union – Van Buren – Warren – Washington – Wayne – Weakley – White – Williamson – Wilson

This National Park Service list is complete through NPS recent listings posted December 12, 2025.

== Current listings ==
	Name on the Register	Image	Date listed	Location	City or town	Description
1	Aquone	Aquone	November 4, 1993 (#93001199)	110 Barberry Rd. 36°19′37″N 82°22′03″W	Johnson City	
2	Boone Hydroelectric Project	Boone Hydroelectric Project	October 26, 2017 (#100001476)	301 Boone Dam Rd. 36°26′25″N 82°26′19″W	Kingsport	Extends into Sullivan County
3	Brown Farm		December 29, 2014 (#14001107)	359 Taylor Bridge Rd. 36°12′22″N 82°29′13″W	Jonesborough	
4	Adam Alexander Broyles House		March 21, 2011 (#11000099)	3118 Old State Route 34; 36°13′19″N 82°35′54″W	Limestone	
5	Broylesville Historic District	Broylesville Historic District	March 28, 1985 (#85000677)	Roughly bounded by Old State Route 34, Taylor Mill and Gravel Hill Rds. along Little Limestone Creek; 36°12′44″N 82°36′16″W	Washington College	Late-18th and early-19th century community initially developed by Adam Broyles, Jr., and his children. Inventory form.
6	Carolina, Clinchfield & Ohio Railroad Station and Depot	Carolina, Clinchfield & Ohio Railroad Station and Depot	March 27, 2008 (#08000238)	300 Buffalo St. 36°18′51″N 82°21′10″W	Johnson City	
7	Isaac Cooper House	Isaac Cooper House	September 7, 1984 (#84003723)	Glendale Rd. 36°19′21″N 82°37′06″W	Limestone	
8	DeVault Tavern	DeVault Tavern	June 4, 1973 (#73001855)	West of Jonesborough on Leesburg Rd. 36°17′33″N 82°32′32″W	Jonesborough vicinity	
9	Valentine DeVault House		July 29, 1977 (#77001298)	5 miles north of Johnson City off DeVault Lane; 36°23′20″N 82°21′12″W	Johnson City vicinity	
10	Dungan's Mill and Stone House	Dungan's Mill and Stone House	July 2, 1973 (#73001854)	3190 Watauga Rd; 36°22′08″N 82°18′15″W	Johnson City	
11	Embree House	Embree House	February 14, 1978 (#78002647)	Southwest of Telford on Walker's Mill Rd. 36°14′44″N 82°33′16″W	Telford vicinity	
12	Col. George Gillespie House	Col. George Gillespie House	August 22, 1977 (#77001299)	Old State Route 34 near Davy Crockett Park Rd. 36°13′23″N 82°37′58″W	Limestone	
13	Isaac Hammer House	Isaac Hammer House	March 19, 1976 (#76001805)	North of Johnson City off U.S. Route 11; 36°22′10″N 82°22′56″W	Johnson City vicinity	
14	Henry Hoss House	Henry Hoss House	December 16, 1982 (#82001734)	Blountville Rd. 36°18′20″N 82°27′49″W	Jonesborough	
15	Johnson City Commercial Historic District	Johnson City Commercial Historic District	July 17, 2003 (#03000666)	E. Market St., E. Main St., Tipton St., Buffalo St., Spring St., S. Roan St., and Colonial Way; 36°19′01″N 82°21′04″W	Johnson City	
16	Johnson City Country Club	Johnson City Country Club	November 15, 2011 (#11000809)	1901 E. Unaka Ave. 36°20′36″N 82°20′27″W	Johnson City	
17	Johnson City Postal Savings Bank and Post Office	Johnson City Postal Savings Bank and Post Office	November 17, 2020 (#100005792)	401 Ashe St. 36°18′47″N 82°21′12″W	Johnson City	
18	Johnson City Warehouse and Commerce Historic District	Johnson City Warehouse and Commerce Historic District	July 17, 2003 (#03000667)	Commerce St., W. Market St., McClure St., and Boone St.; also 107 N. Boone, 100-102, 104, 200, 204, 210, and 214 Montgomery Sts. 36°19′02″N 82°21′15″W	Johnson City	Second set of addresses represents a boundary decrease of December 2, 2014
19	Jonesborough Historic District	Jonesborough Historic District	December 23, 1969 (#69000183)	Roughly bounded by Depot and College Sts., 3rd Ave., and the junction of Main St. and Franklin Ave.; also roughly along E. Main St. from Franklin Ave. and 624 E. Main St.; also roughly along S. Cherokee St. from Depot St. to 504 S. Cherokee St., and Locust St. 36°17′35″N 82°28′24″W	Jonesborough	Second set of addresses represent a boundary increase of November 27, 2019
20	Martin Kitzmiller House	Martin Kitzmiller House	July 25, 1985 (#85001609)	U.S. Route 23, Boone's Creek; 36°23′47″N 82°24′53″W	Gray	
21	Knob Creek Historic District		July 10, 1986 (#86001543)	Gray Station, Knob Creek, and Fair Ridge Rds. 36°20′30″N 82°24′35″W	Johnson City	
22	Montrose Court Apartments	Montrose Court Apartments	April 21, 1980 (#80003879)	Montrose Ct. 36°18′24″N 82°21′26″W	Johnson City	
23	Mountain Branch, National Home for Disabled Volunteer Soldiers	Mountain Branch, National Home for Disabled Volunteer Soldiers	June 17, 2011 (#11000560)	Corner of Lamont and Sidney Sts. 36°18′38″N 82°22′24″W	Johnson City	
24	Plum Grove Archaeological Site		September 5, 1985 (#85002353)	Address Restricted	Jonesborough vicinity	
25	Peter Range Stone House	Peter Range Stone House	December 15, 1983 (#83004312)	2833 E Oakland Ave; 36°21′31″N 82°22′42″W	Johnson City	
26	Robin's Roost	Robin's Roost	January 20, 1976 (#76001806)	S. Roane St. 36°18′38″N 82°20′41″W	Johnson City	
27	St. Paul AME Zion Church	St. Paul AME Zion Church	April 12, 2001 (#01000382)	201 Welbourne St. 36°19′15″N 82°21′08″W	Johnson City	
28	Salem Presbyterian Church	Salem Presbyterian Church	September 22, 1992 (#92001255)	147 Washington College Rd. 36°13′08″N 82°34′20″W	Limestone	Listed both individually and as a contributing property in the Washington College Historic District; designed by architect A. Page Brown.
29	Shelbridge	Shelbridge	December 14, 1995 (#95001477)	101 E 11th Ave; 36°19′38″N 82°21′52″W	Johnson City	
30	Sulphur Springs Methodist Campground	Sulphur Springs Methodist Campground	May 12, 1975 (#75001796)	North of Jonesborough off State Route 81 in Sulphur Springs Community; 36°20′53″N 82°32′29″W	Jonesborough vicinity	
31	Thomas Telford House	Thomas Telford House	February 10, 1982 (#82004064)	145 Jonesborough Waterplnt Rd; 36°12′30″N 82°36′17″W	Limestone vicinity	Constructed c. 1815 by Thomas Telford (1766–1816); also a contributing property in the Broylesville Historic District.
32	Thankful Baptist Church	Thankful Baptist Church	August 8, 2001 (#01000852)	104 Water St. 36°19′10″N 82°21′04″W	Johnson City	
33	Tipton-Haynes House	Tipton-Haynes House	February 26, 1970 (#70000620)	2620 South Roan Street; 36°17′37″N 82°20′06″W	Johnson City	
34	Tree Streets Historic District	Tree Streets Historic District	March 12, 1996 (#96000232)	Roughly bounded by S. Roan, W. Chestnut, Franklin, and Virginia Sts. and University Parkway; 36°18′29″N 82°21′18″W	Johnson City	
35	Washington College Historic District	Washington College Historic District	July 17, 2002 (#02000812)	116 Doak Ln. 36°13′04″N 82°34′19″W	Washington College	Early college established in 1780; most extant buildings constructed in the mid-19th and early-20th centuries. Inventory form.
36	Wassom Farm	Wassom Farm	May 2, 2018 (#100002265)	276 Matthews Mill Rd. 36°14′49″N 82°33′52″W	Telford	

== Former listings ==
	Name on the Register	Image	Date listed	Date removed	Location	City or town	Description
1	Bashor Mill	Bashor Mill	July 8, 1980 (#80003878)	March 17, 2025	248 Denny Mill Rd; 36°20′51″N 82°24′17″W	Johnson City	
2	Bowers–Kirkpatrick Farmstead		March 12, 1998 (#97001108)	March 20, 2017	3033 Boone's Creek Rd. 36°23′08″N 82°25′00″W	Gray	
3	Memorial Stadium		July 19, 2010 (#10000472)	April 20, 2011	Intersection of E Main Street and Lonnie Lowe Lane; 36°19′17″N 82°20′26″W	Johnson City	
4	Christopher Taylor House	Christopher Taylor House	December 9, 1971 (#71000839)	April 30, 2009	Main St. 36°16′35″N 82°29′47″W	Jonesborough	Relocated to downtown Jonesborough in 1974.

== See also ==
- List of National Historic Landmarks in Tennessee
- National Register of Historic Places listings in Tennessee
