= Thankful Baptist Church =

Thankful Baptist Church may refer to:

- Thankful Baptist Church (Rome, Georgia), listed on the National Register of Historic Places in Floyd County, Georgia
- Thankful Baptist Church (Johnson City, Tennessee), listed on the National Register of Historic Places in Washington County, Tennessee
