= Moody Dunbar =

American food company

Moody Dunbar, Inc. is an American food company. It sells bell peppers, roasted peppers, pimientos, and sweet potatoes. It is the largest producer of bell peppers and the second-largest canner of sweet potatoes in the United States.

== Overview ==
A family business, it was founded by Moody Dunbar in 1933. His son, Stanley K. Dunbar, serves as the current Chief Executive Officer. He serves on the Board of Directors of the Grocery Manufacturers Association and the Advisory Board of Liberty Mutual. The treasurer is Christina M. Dunbar.

Moody Dunbar, Inc was formerly headquartered in Limestone, Tennessee, and it is now headquartered in Johnson City, Tennessee. It has processing facilities in Dunn, North Carolina and Santa Paula, California.
