= Filip Videnov =

Bulgarian basketball player

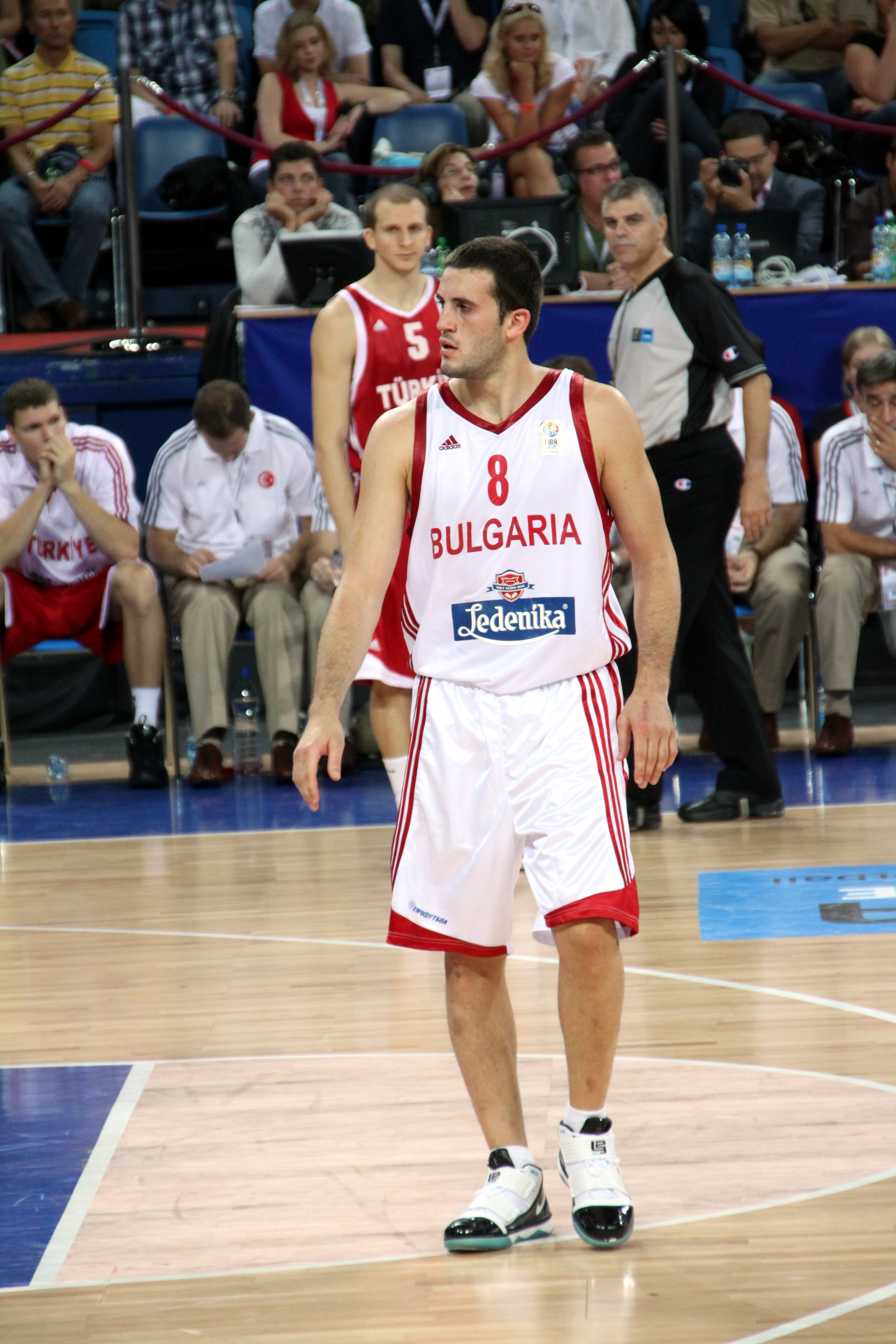

Personal information
- Born: 12 June 1980 (age 46) Sofia, Bulgaria
- Listed height: 1.96 m (6 ft 5 in)
- Listed weight: 97 kg (214 lb)

Career information
- High school: Washington College Academy (Limestone, Tennessee)
- College: Western Kentucky (1999–2003)
- NBA draft: 2003: undrafted
- Playing career: 2003–2018
- Position: Shooting guard

Career history
- 1997–1998: Dunav Ruse
- 2003: Split
- 2004–2005: SLUC Nancy
- 2005–2006: Tekelspor
- 2006: Real Madrid
- 2006–2007: Caja San Fernando
- 2007: Dunav Ruse
- 2008: Solsonica Rieti
- 2008–2009: Granada
- 2009–2010: Crvena zvezda
- 2010: FMP
- 2010–2011: Asseco Prokom Gdynia
- 2011–2012: Olin Edirne Basket
- 2012: Nizhny Novgorod
- 2013: Olin Edirne Basket
- 2013–2014: Lukoil Academic
- 2014–2015: Krasnye Krylia
- 2015: Levski Sofia
- 2015: Azad University Tehran
- 2015–2017: Lukoil Academic
- 2017: Shahrdari Arak
- 2017–2018: Petrochimi Bandar Imam
- 2018: Beroe

Career highlights
- Polish League champion (2011); Polish Supercup winner (2011); Turkish League All-Star (2006)

Filip Aleksandrov Videnov (born 12 June 1980) is a Bulgarian retired professional basketball player who last played for Beroe of the NBL. He was also a longtime member of the Bulgarian men's national team.

Videnov played college basketball in the United States at Western Kentucky University. He played high school basketball at Washington College Academy in Limestone, Tennessee.

== See also ==
- List of foreign basketball players in Serbia
