= Thomas Telford House =

- U.S. National Register of Historic Places
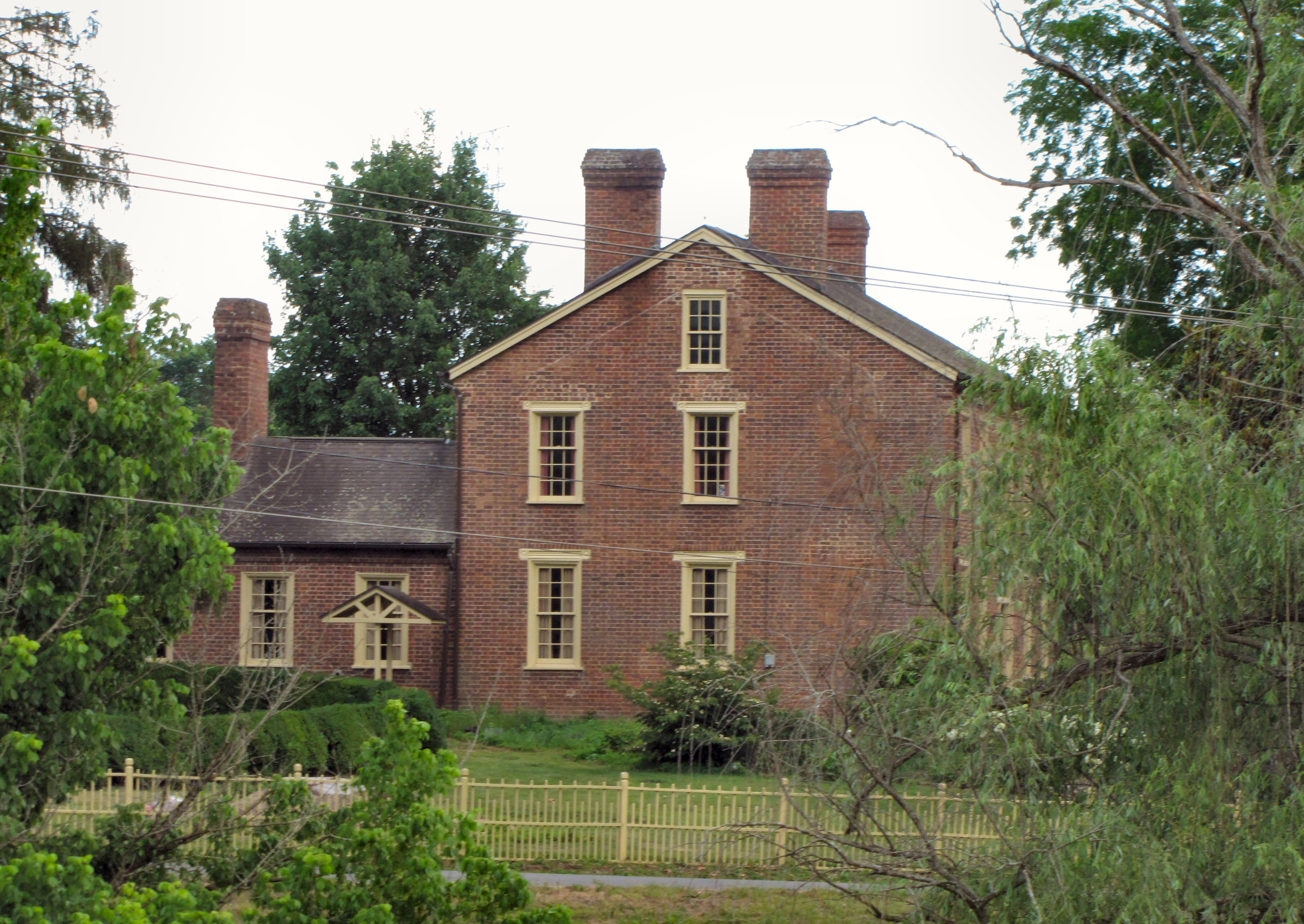
- The Thomas Telford House in 2015

- Location within Tennessee Location within the United States
- Nearest city: Limestone, Tennessee
- Coordinates: 36°12′30″N 82°36′17″W
- Area: 1 acre (0.40 ha)
- Built: 1815
- Architectural style: Federal
- NRHP reference No.: 82004064
- Added to NRHP: February 10, 1982

The Thomas Telford House is a historic house near Limestone, Tennessee, U.S..

The house was built in 1815 for Thomas Telford, a settler who died in 1816. It was inherited by his son George Whitfield Telford, who lived here with his wife Amanda Duff Hannah and their 12 daughters. From 1881 to his death in 1887, he lived here with his second wife, the former M.A. Hughes. Telford was the owner of the Telford Manufacturing Company. He was also a co-founder and director of the East Tennessee and Virginia Railroad, and he served in the Tennessee General Assembly from 1853 to 1857. He became known as "Colonel" G. W. Telford. The house was sold out of the Telford family shortly after his death.

The house was designed in the Federal architectural style. It has been listed on the National Register of Historic Places since February 10, 1982.
