= Shelbridge =

- U.S. National Register of Historic Places
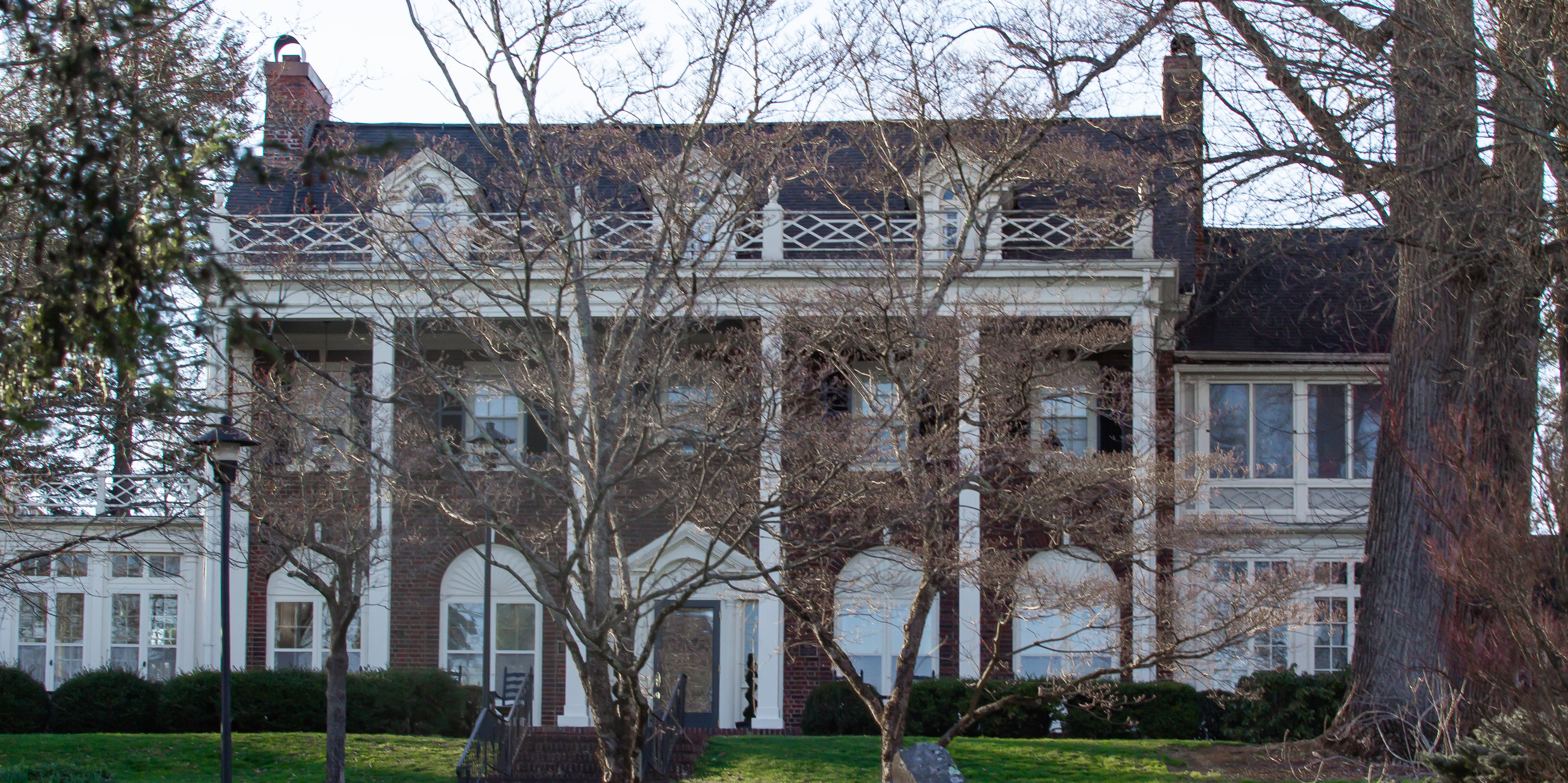
- The residence as seen in 2021

- Location within Tennessee Location within the United States
- Location: Jct. of N. Roan and E. 11th Sts., Johnson City, Tennessee
- Coordinates: 36°19′38″N 82°21′52″W
- Area: 8.3 acres (3.4 ha)
- Built: 1920
- Built by: Mark Curtis
- Architect: D.R. Beeson (house), Leland Cardwell (landscape)
- Architectural style: Colonial Revival
- Website: archives.etsu.edu/shellbridge
- NRHP reference No.: 95001477
- Added to NRHP: December 14, 1995

Shelbridge is a historic three-story mansion in Johnson City, Tennessee, U.S.. It serves as the official residence of the president of East Tennessee State University.

== History ==
The house was built in 1920-1921 for Ross Spears, a businessman. In 1928, it was acquired by Henry P. Bridges, a businessman. Bridges renamed it Shelbridge after his wife, Shelby.

In the 1970s, the house was donated to East Tennessee State University, and it became the president's house. The first president to live in the house was D.P. Culp; the family moved in 1973. Six presidents have occupied the estate since. It is now home to current ETSU President Brian Noland.

== Architectural significance ==
The house was designed by architect D. R. Beeson in the Colonial Revival style. It has been listed on the National Register of Historic Places since December 14, 1995.
