= Brush arbor revival =

Type of religious meeting

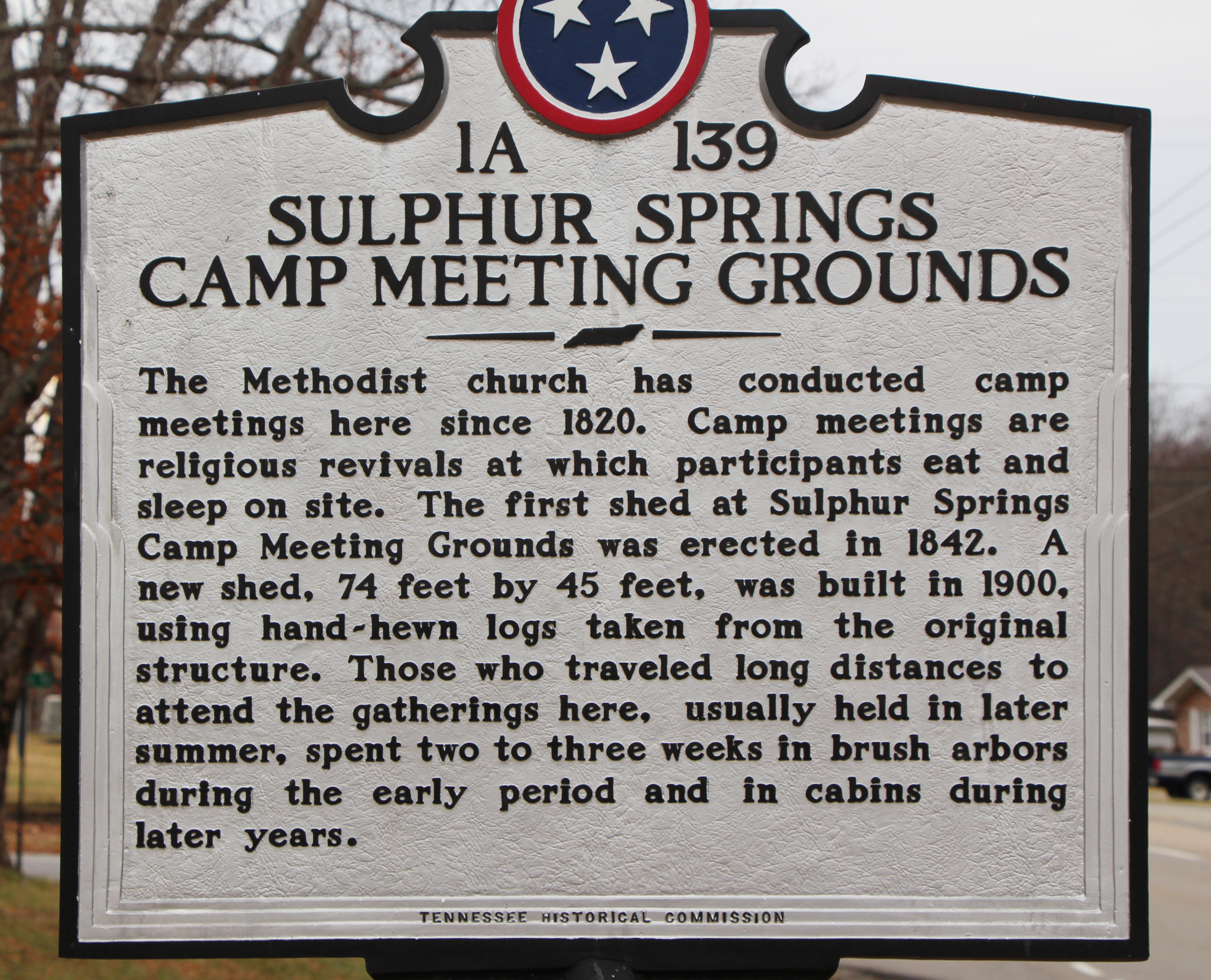
A plaque delineating the history of brush arbor revivals and camp meetings at the Sulphur Springs Methodist Campground

A brush arbor revival, (Note: In American English, the spelling is brush arbor revival.) also known as brush arbor meeting, (Note: In International English, brush arbour meeting is the spelling of the term, whereas in American English, the spelling is brush arbor meeting.) is a revival service that takes place under an open-sided shelter called an arbor, which is "constructed of vertical poles driven into the ground with additional long poles laid across the top as support for a roof of brush, cut branches or hay".

== History ==
Methodists and Baptists widely use brush arbor revivals to communicate the Christian proclamation of salvation, which have historically contributed to the growth of these denominations. For Methodists, this salvation message includes preaching the doctrines of the New Birth and entire sanctification, as well as calling backsliders to repentance. They originated in the 1700s, being regularly assembled when itinerant preachers announced in advance that they would be arriving in an area; their design served to protect seekers from precipitation. Though brush arbor revivals continue in the present day, they are the forerunner of the Methodist camp meetings. Their success has historically led to the planting of local churches, as was the case with the American churches Morris Chapel United Methodist Church in Walkertown, North Carolina, and Swift Creek Methodist Church in Macon, Georgia. Many of the first Sunday schools run by Methodists were held under brush arbors.

== See also ==
- Camp meeting
- Sukkot
- Tent revival
