= Henry Hoss House =

- U.S. National Register of Historic Places
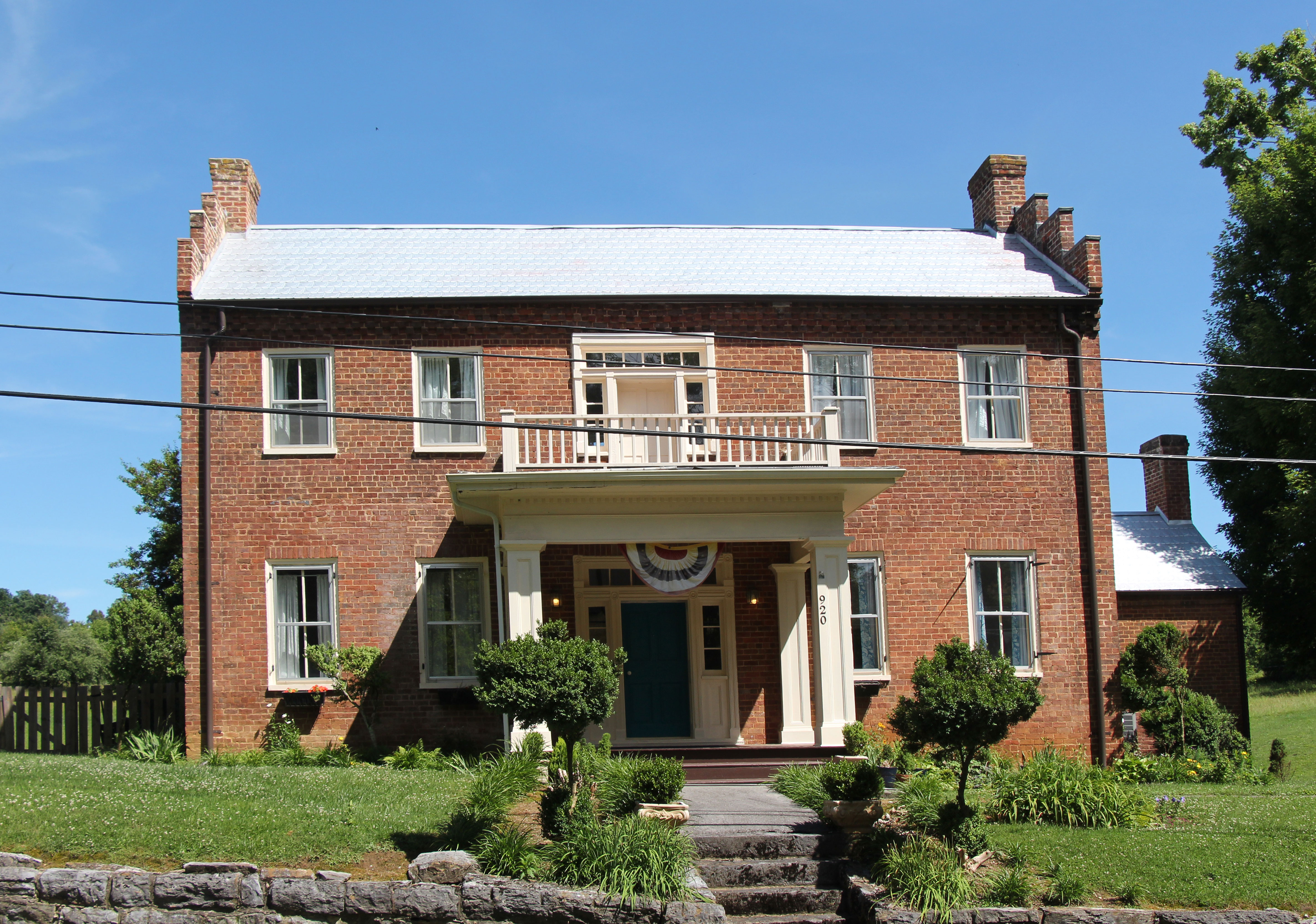

- Location within Tennessee Location within the United States
- Location: Old Boones Creek Rd., Jonesborough, Tennessee
- Coordinates: 36°18′20″N 82°27′49″W
- Area: 2 acres (0.81 ha)
- Architectural style: Federal
- NRHP reference No.: 82001734
- Added to NRHP: December 16, 1982

The Henry Hoss House is a historic house in Jonesborough, Tennessee, U.S.A., although not within the Jonesborough Historic District. It was built somewhere between 1859 and 1860 for Dr. Joseph S. Rhea and his wife, Lady Kirkpatrick. Their home served as a residence as well as a clinic; the front rooms on either side of the foyer were the doctor's waiting room and examining room, and the upstairs bedrooms were probably for their children. It was sold to Henry Hoss in the midst of the American Civil War of 1861-1865. Hoss lived here with his wife, née Anna Maria Sevier (grand daughter of John Sevier), and their children. It remained in the Hoss family until 1980.

The house was designed in the Federal architectural style. It has been listed on the National Register of Historic Places since December 16, 1982. Jonesborough is an area of Tennessee with more houses (about five) of the Federal style that have stepped gables than any other area of the state. The crow-stepped gabling of the east and west sides makes the Hoss House the only example of a rural Federal style house in Washington County, Tennessee, with stepped gables.

== Architecture ==
=== Exterior ===
The Henry Hoss House, constructed circa 1859-1860, is a late Federal style rectangular-shaped two-story brick house with a step-gabled roof, five bay facade, one-story step-gabled brick ell, and one-story gabled roof brick addition that was built onto the rear ell in 1865. The 1914 barn and springhouse are now gone. The house remains in good condition with little alteration and retains a high degree of architectural integrity, both on the exterior and interior.

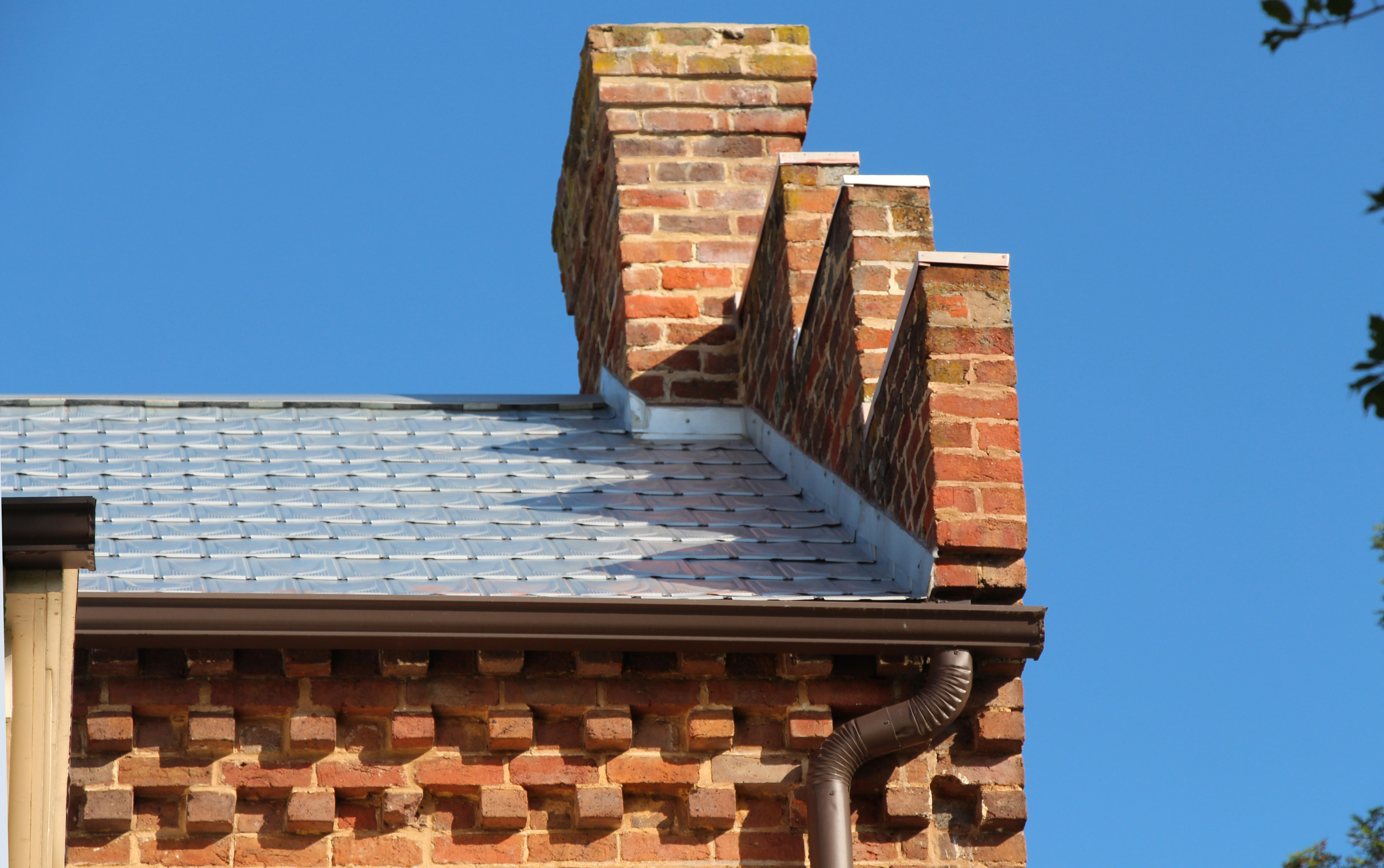
Corbeling and corbie steps on south and east side of Henry Hoss House

The symmetrical common bond brick facade of the Henry Hoss House faces northwest and is five bays wide. A central single door with multi light transom, side lights, and bull's eye motif wood work surrounding the door is flanked at each side by two 2/2 light rectangular windows with flat brick arches. The window and door arrangement of the first story is repeated on the second story, except the windows are shorter and the doorway has plain surrounds. Brick corbeling serves as a frieze across the facade under the roof. The central bay one-story porch, not original, has heavy Doric paneled posts and pilasters, a denticulated frieze and cornice, and a balustraded parapet.

Brick chimneys are flush with the five-step gabled ends of the front rectangular section of the house. The northeast gable end elevation of this two-story section of the house has no structural openings; the opposite, or southwest, gable end elevation has two 2/2 light rectangular windows on the first story and two shorter like windows placed directly above on 'the second story.

Traces of pencilling on the brick mortar consisting of names and dates are very apparent on the south back porch, east side porch, and north front porch. The earliest date from 1870, and include descendants of Henry Hoss and Anna Marie Sevier.

=== Interior ===
The interior of the Henry Hoss House has been altered as little as the exterior. The alterations are limited basically to adding bathrooms (3 1/2), and the remodeling of the kitchen in the early twentieth century. Original pine flooring, the central hall staircase, molding around windows and doors, and five mantels over five fireplaces remain intact. The mantels are each different in design, although they are all wood and exhibit influence of Federal and Greek Revival decoration.

== Gallery ==
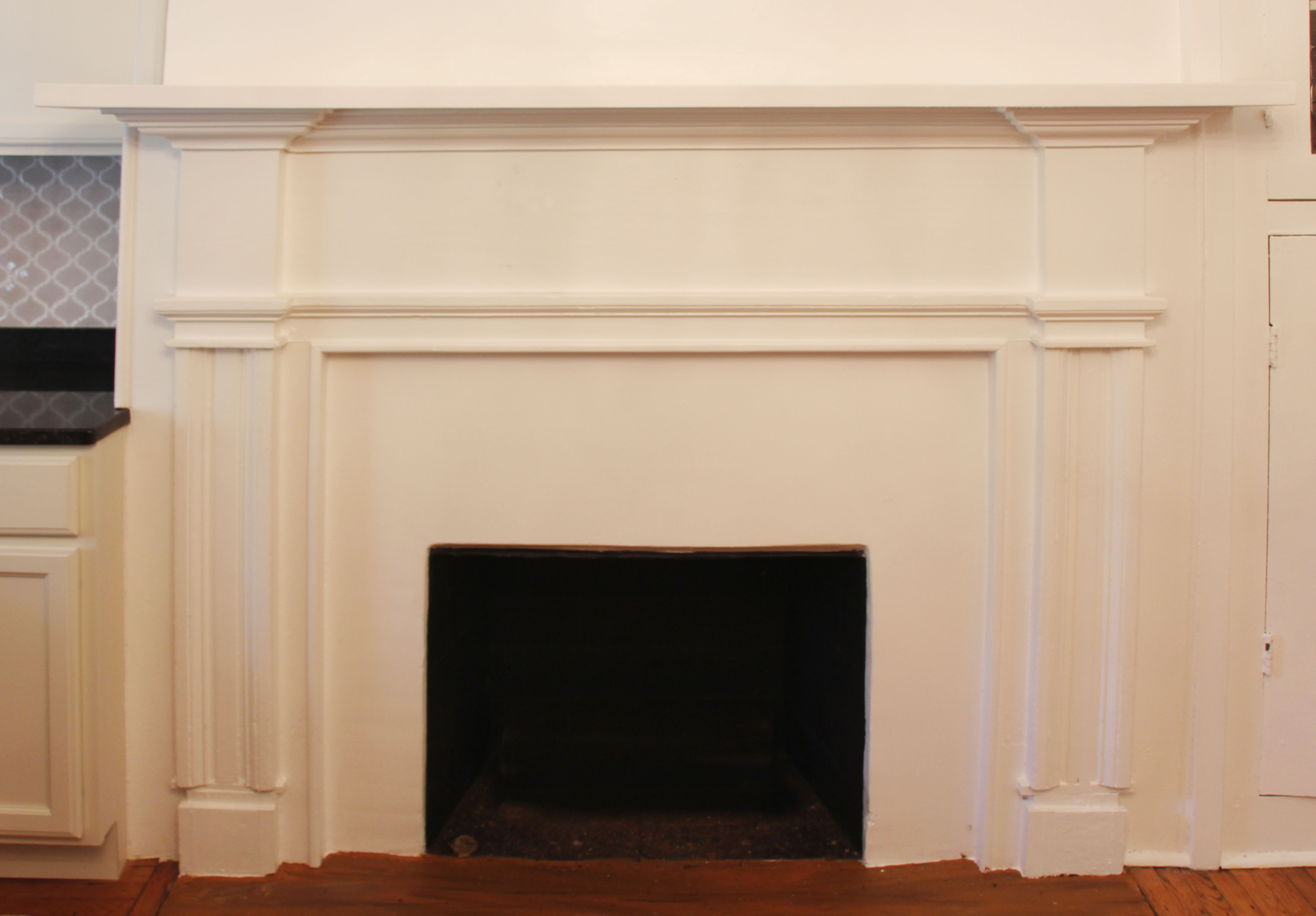
Hoss House kitchen mantle

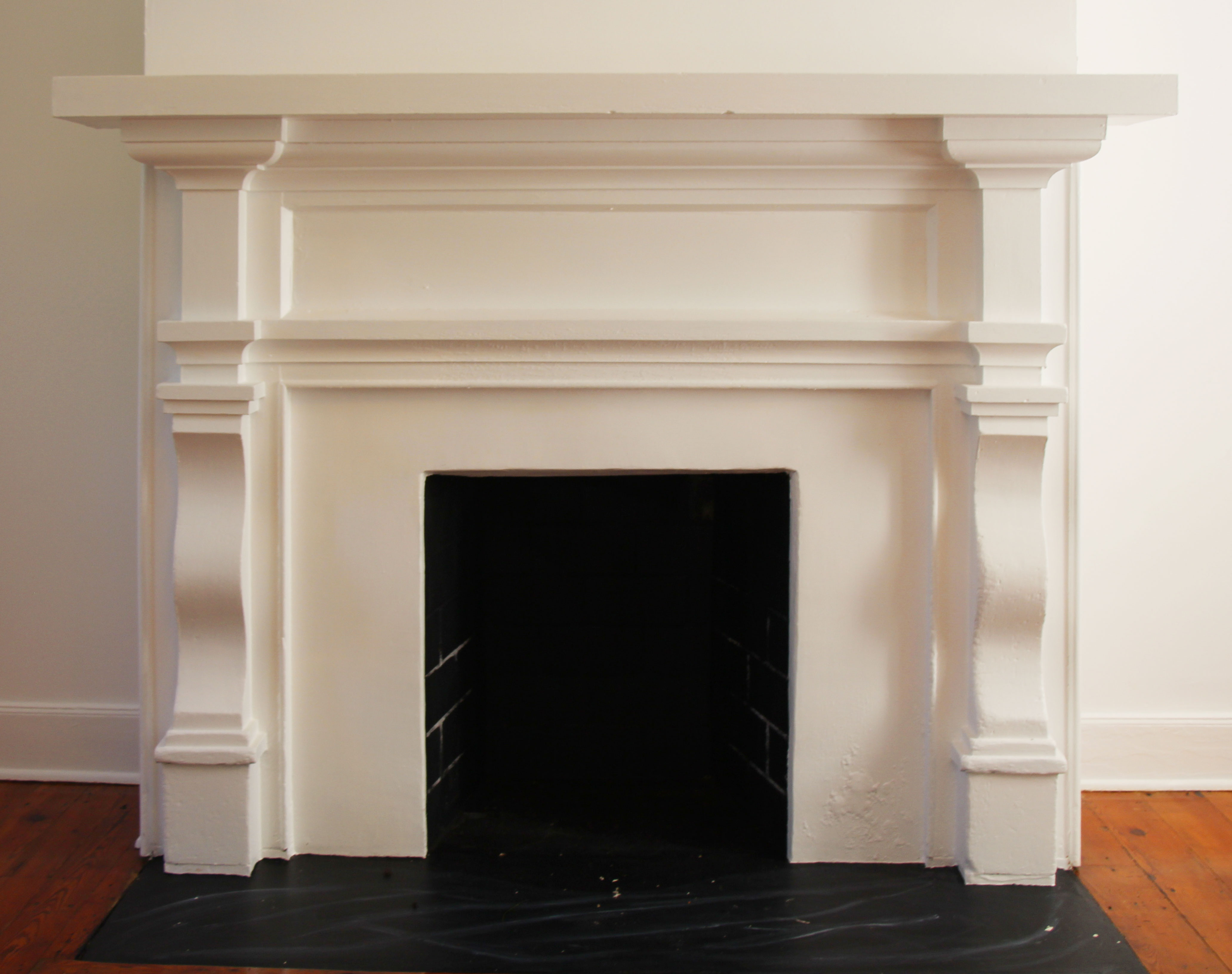
Hoss House 1st floor east side mantle

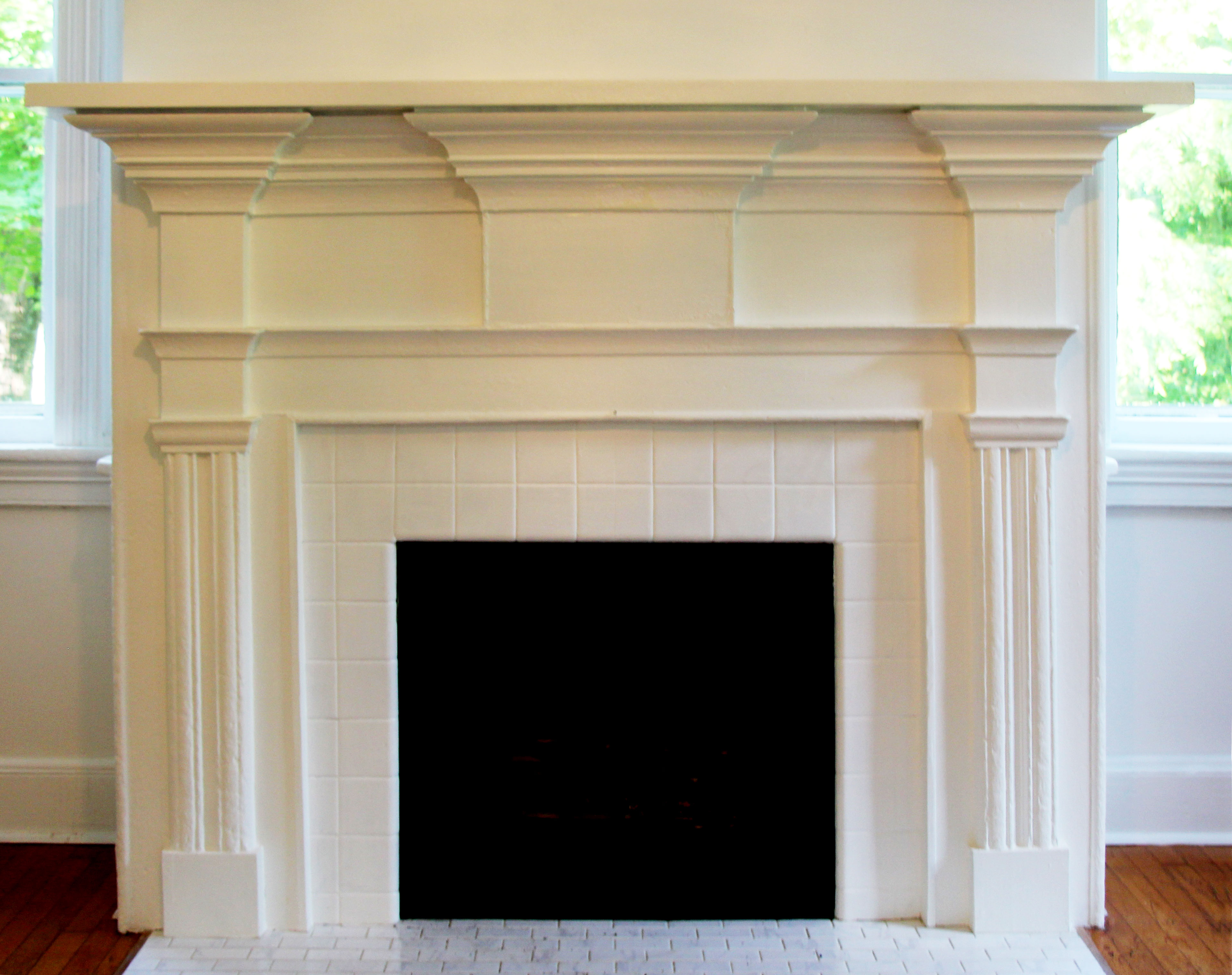
Hoss House 1st floor west side mantle

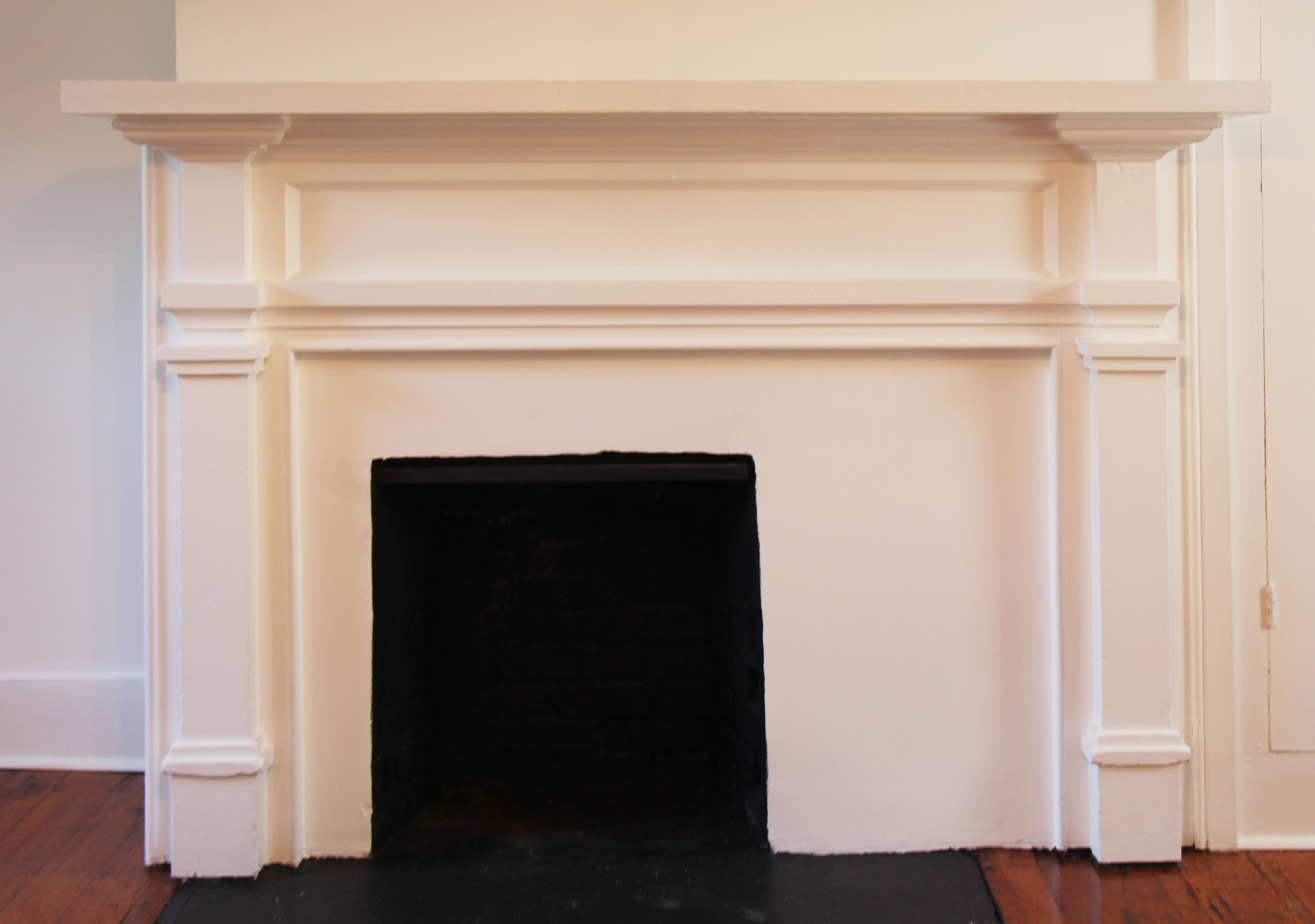
Hoss House 2nd floor east side mantle

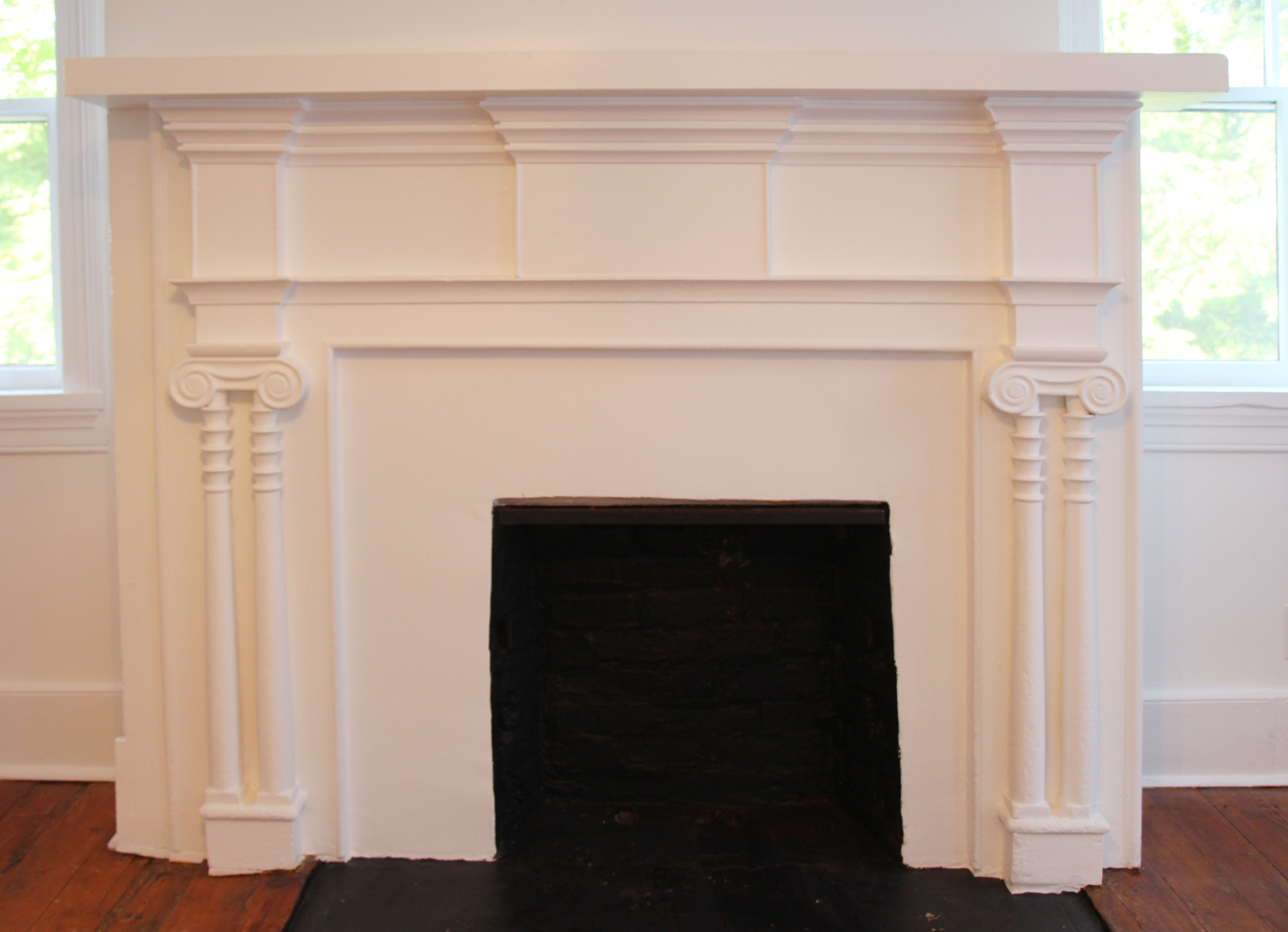
Hoss-House-west mantle 2nd floor

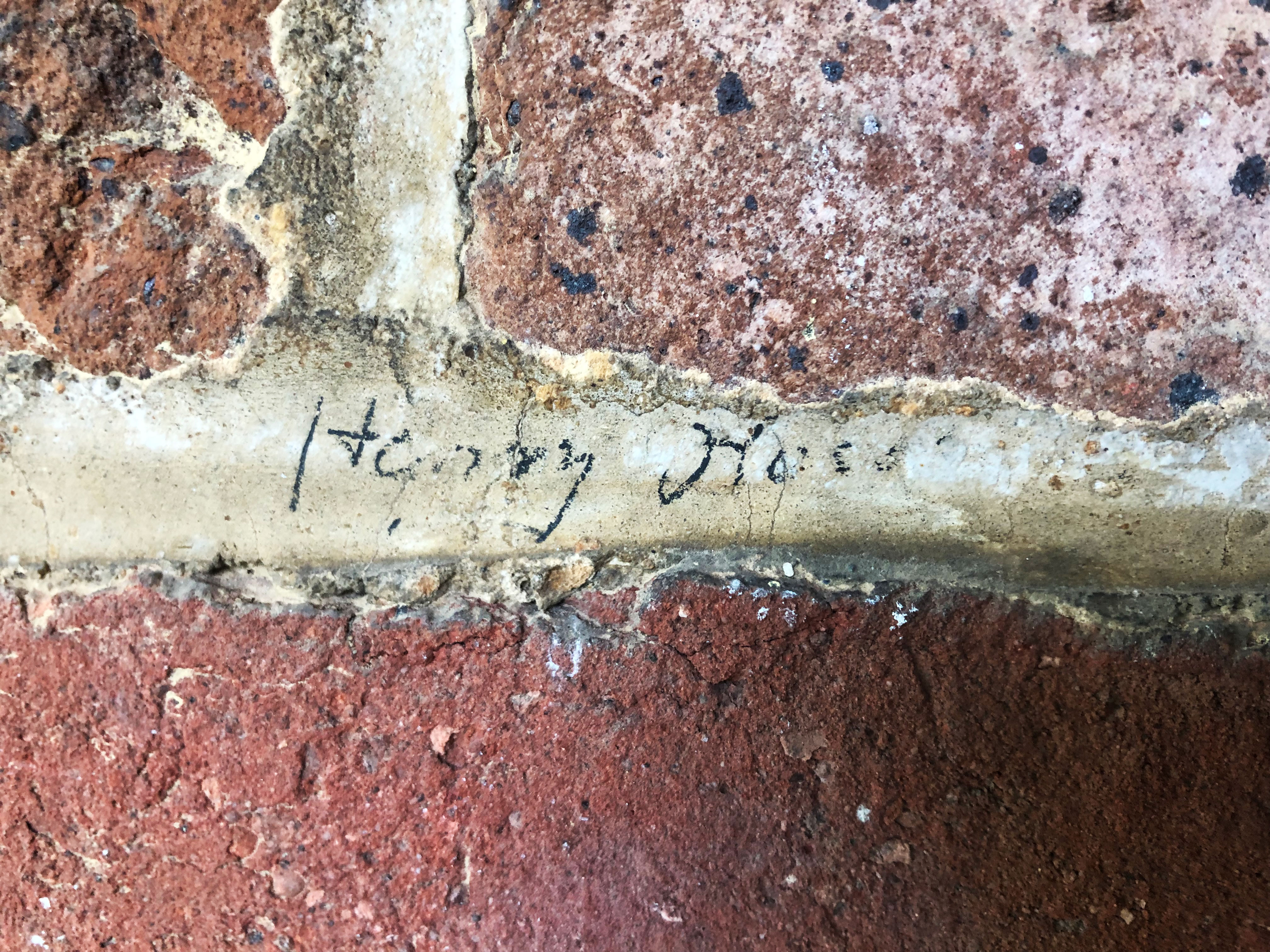
Henry Hoss

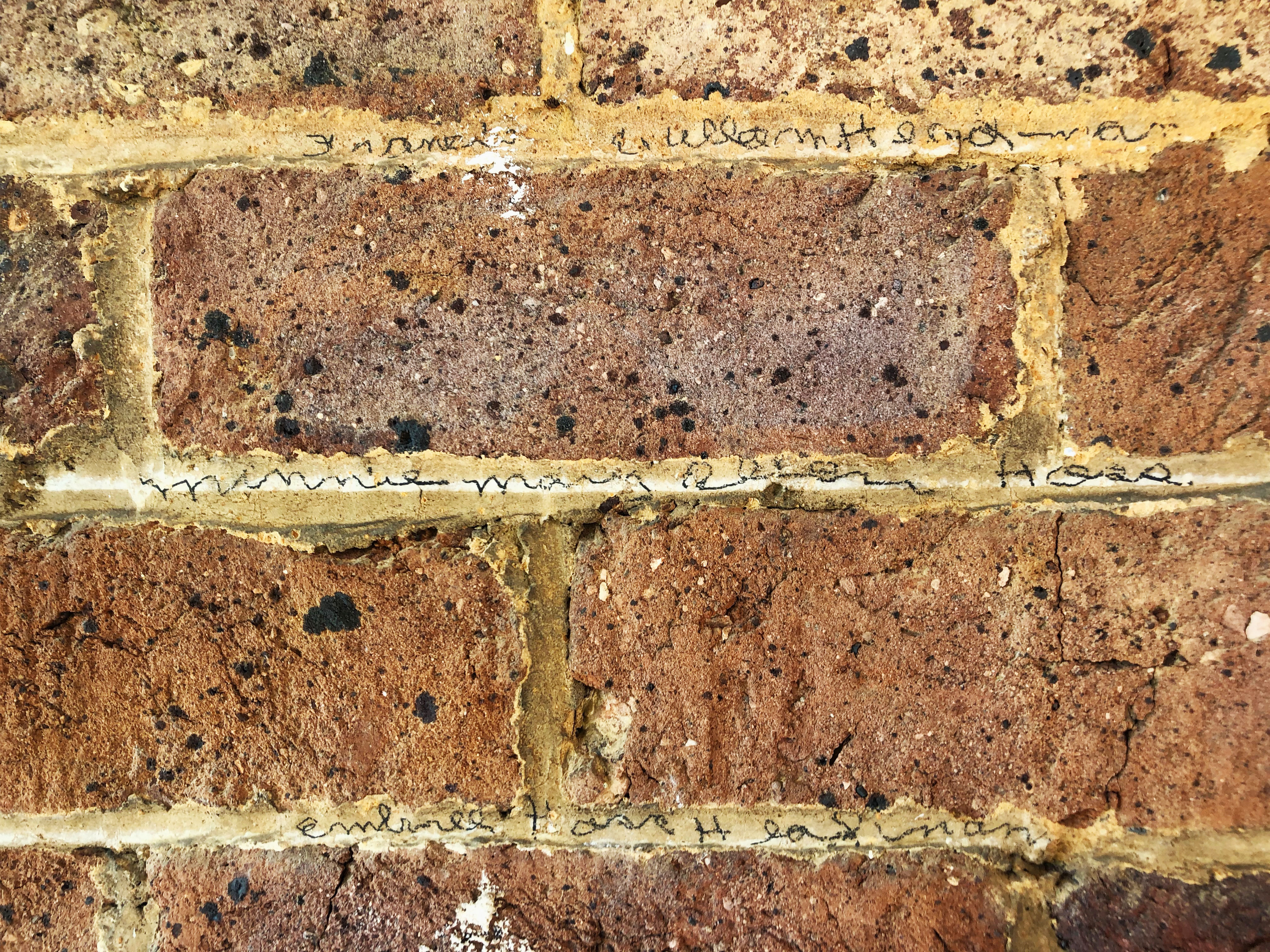
Minnie Mary Hoss, b. 1874, grand daughter of Henry Hoss and Anna Sevier

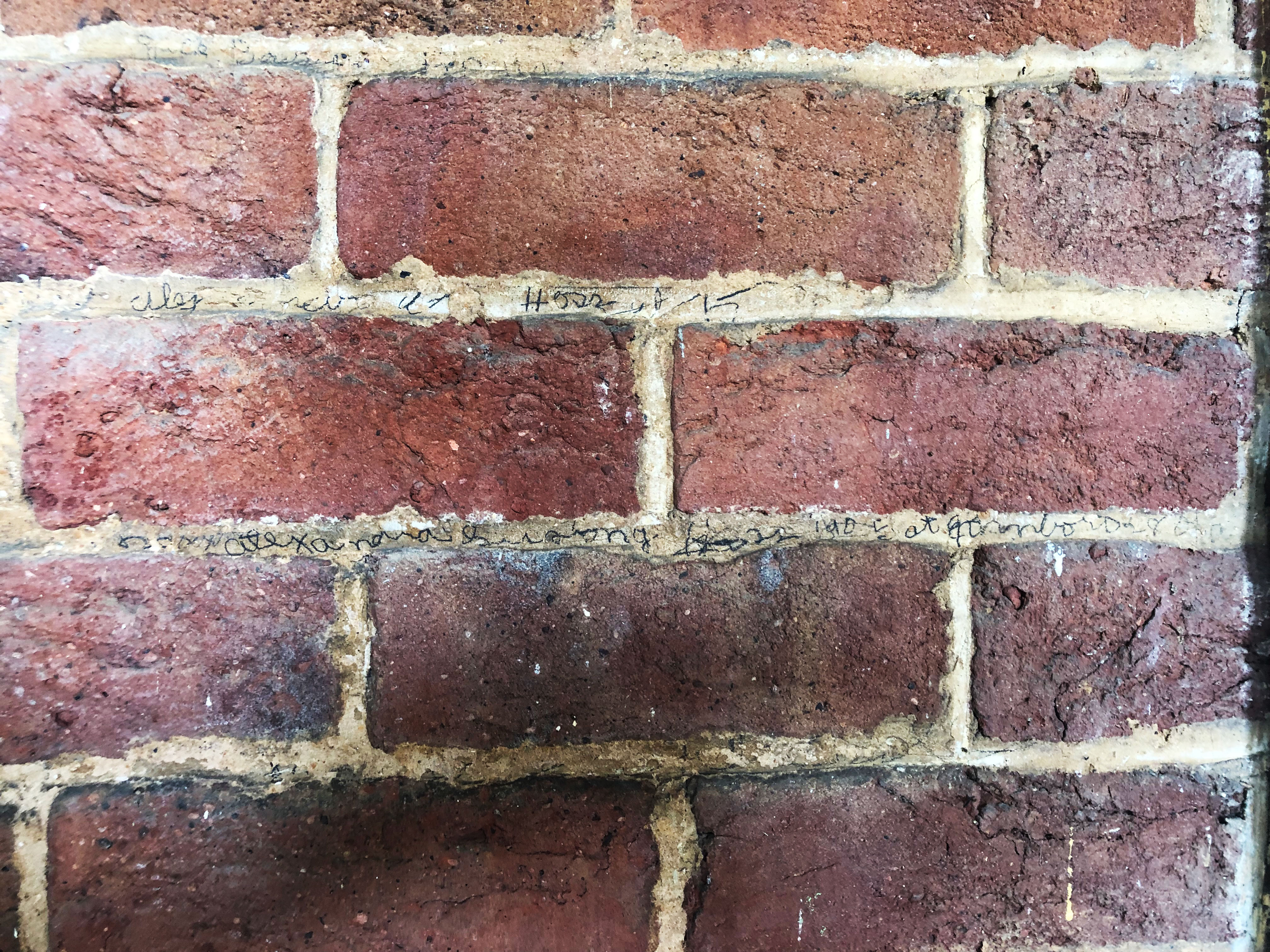
Alexandra Susong Hoss, b. 1905, grand daughter of Henry Hoss and Anna Sevier

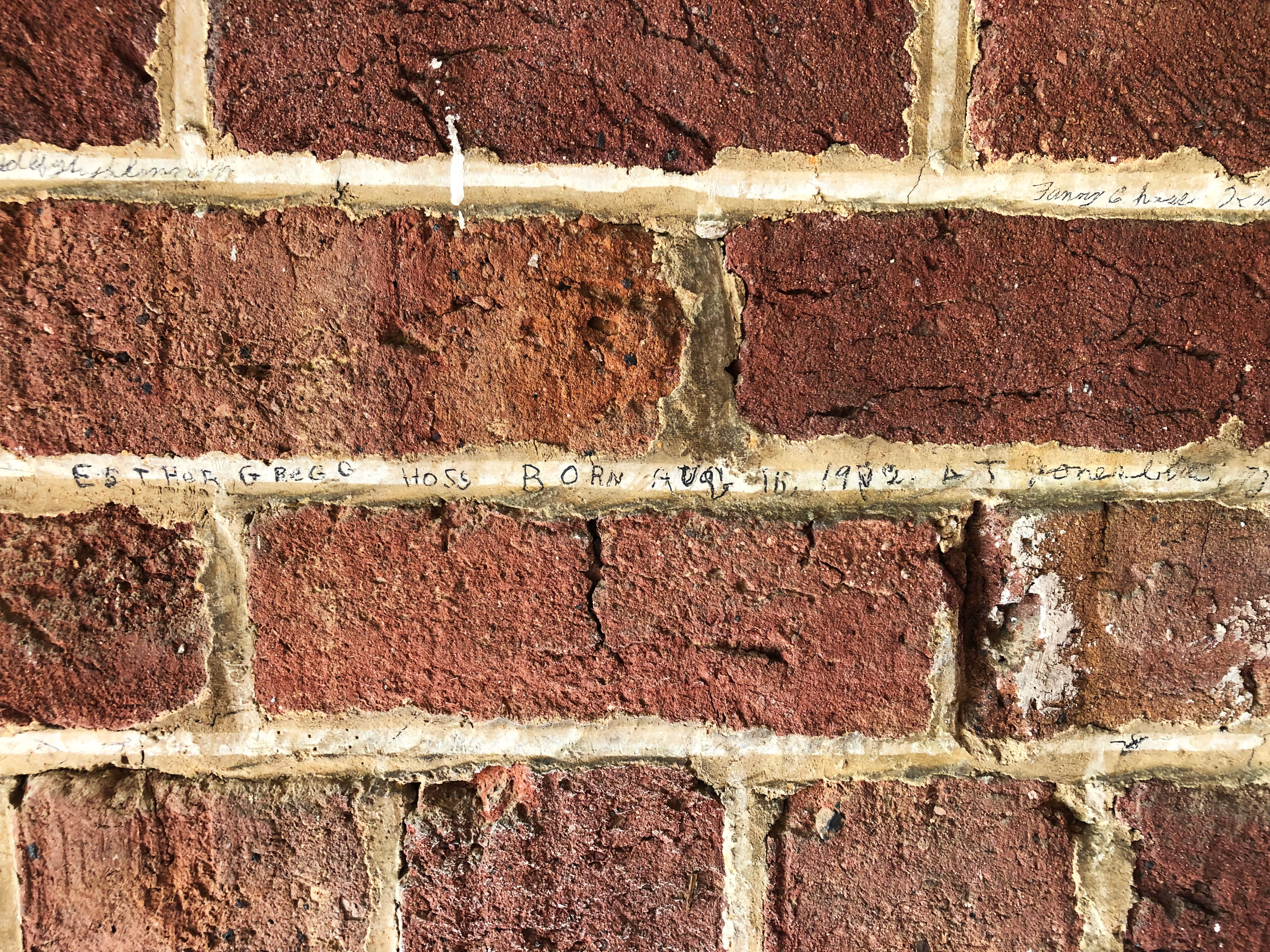
Esther Gregg Hoss, b. 1902, grand daughter of Henry Hoss and Anna Sevier
