= Samuel Cole Williams =

American judge (1864 – 1947)

Samuel Cole Williams (January 15, 1864 – December 14, 1947) was an American jurist, historian, educator, and businessman. He was born and raised in the state of Tennessee, where he primarily had his career in Johnson City in East Tennessee.

== Early life ==
Samuel C. Williams was born January 15, 1864, near Humboldt, Tennessee. At the urging of family friend Horace Lurton, later a U. S. Supreme Court Justice, Williams pursued law training. He attended Vanderbilt University's School of Law and graduated in June 1884. After a few years of legal practice in Jonesborough, Tennessee, Williams moved to Johnson City, Tennessee, in 1892.

Williams joined politician Walter P. Brownlow in forming Watauga Light and Power Company and the Johnson City Transit Company (Johnson City Streetcar Company). In conjunction with John Cox he established the Banking and Trust Company which later became known as Unaka National Bank, Tennessee National Bank, and finally Hamilton National Bank. Judge Williams also had interests in the Empire Chair Company and the John Sevier Hotel.

== Government and public service ==
In 1912 Williams became Chancellor of First Chancery Division of Tennessee. In 1913 he was appointed to complete a vacated seat on the Tennessee Supreme Court. The next year he was elected to the court for a four-year term. He was re-elected in 1918.

He left the Tennessee Supreme Court to serve as first dean of the Lamar School of Law (also known as Emory University School of Law) in Atlanta, Georgia, from 1919 to 1924.

He was appointed to codify the laws of Tennessee in 1928 and again in 1938. His eight-volume work, Williams Annotated Code of Tennessee, commonly known as The Williams Code, became a model for other state revisions.

== Historian and writer ==
In 1925 Judge Williams retired to his estate, Aquone, at Johnson City, Tennessee. The house, named after a Cherokee word for "resting place", was modeled after a Maryland colonial house which Williams had visited. His personal library was fashioned after the design of Sir Walter Scott's study at Abbotsford House. The home is listed on both the Tennessee Historical Register and the National Register of Historic Places.

In his later years Williams devoted much of his time to writing. His history texts and articles carried his personal, if wordy, enthusiastic style which helped to popularize local history studies. Tennessee Governor Prentice Cooper appointed Williams to head the rejuvenated Tennessee Historical Commission in 1941. In that position he founded publications and arranged the 1944 purchase of a Johnson City farm, which was designated as the Tipton-Haynes Historic Site. During these years Williams founded the East Tennessee Historical Society. He also provided the land and financing for construction of the public library in Johnson City, dedicated and named in memory of his late son, Mayne Williams.

During his final years, Williams helped prepare for the Tennessee Sesquicentennial in 1946. He served as a member of the Advisory Committee on the Rules of Civil Procedure in the Federal Courts.

Judge Williams was an avid scholar and collector of Tennessee history; he donated many of his items to libraries and museums. His papers are held by the East Tennessee State University Archives of Appalachia, the University of Tennessee's Frank H. McClung Museum, and the Archives of Emory University.

He died December 14, 1947.

== Works ==
- History of the Lost State of Franklin (1924)
- Lieut. Henry Timberlake's Memoirs, 1756–1765 (editor, 1927)
- Early Travels in the Tennessee Country, 1540–1800 (1928)
- Adair's History of the American Indians (editor, 1930) (see James Adair (historian))
- Beginnings of West Tennessee: In the Land of the Chickasaws, 1541–1841 (1930)
- General John T. Wilder, Commander of the Lightning Brigade (1936)
- Dawn of Tennessee Valley and Tennessee History (1937)
- History of Johnson City and its Environs (1940)
- Phases of Southwest Territory History (1940)
- The Lincolns and Tennessee (1942)
- Tennessee During the American Revolutionary War (1944)
- Phases of the History of the Supreme Court of Tennessee (1944)
- The Admission of Tennessee into the Union (1945)
- William Tatham, Wataugan (1947)

== See also ==
- John Haywood
- J. G. M. Ramsey
