= Salem Presbyterian Church (Washington College, Tennessee) =

Historic church in Tennessee, United States

- U.S. National Register of Historic Places
- U.S. Historic district – Contributing property
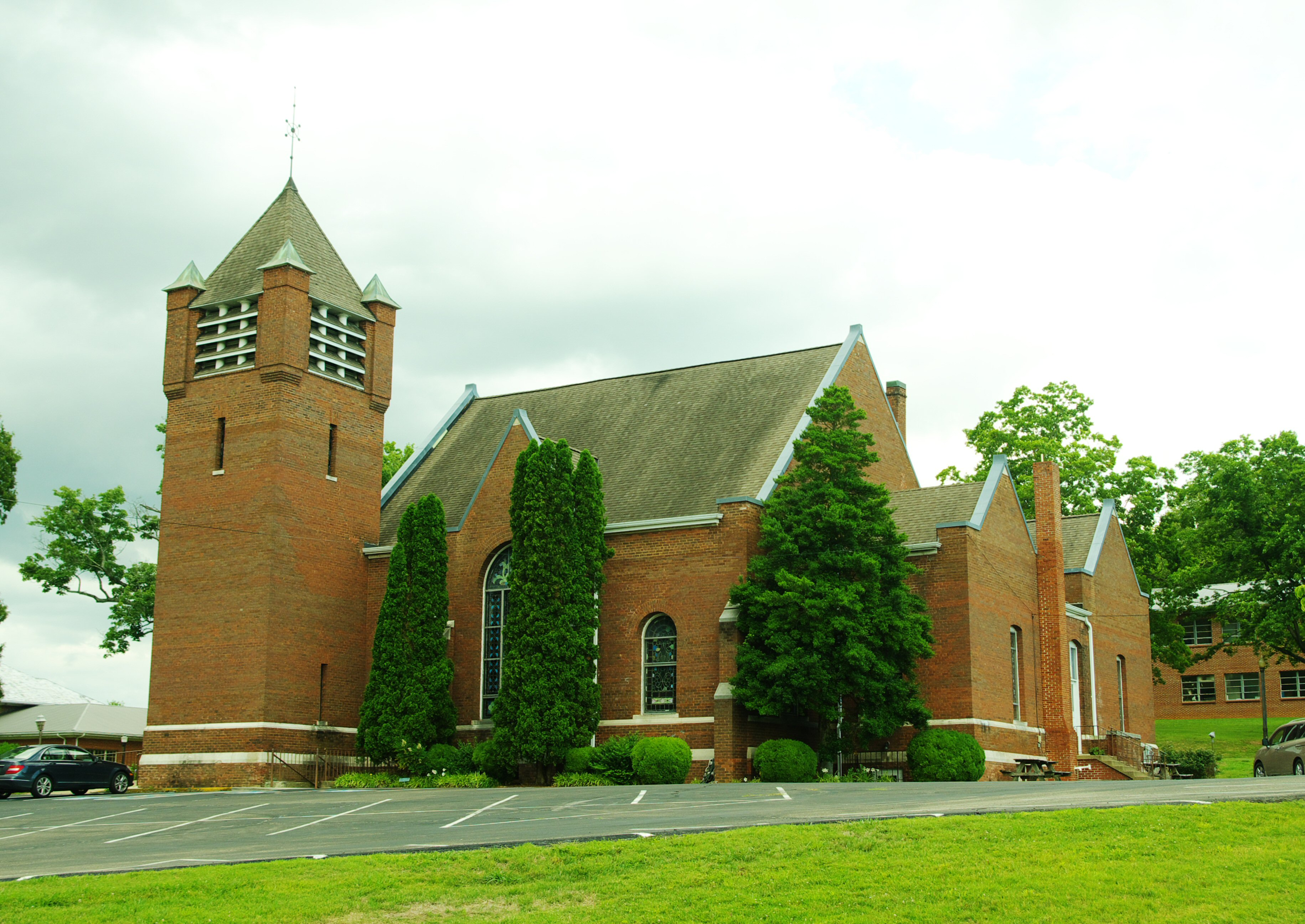

- Location within Tennessee Location within the United States
- Location: 147 Washington College Rd., Washington College, Tennessee
- Coordinates: 36°13′8″N 82°34′20″W
- Area: 1.3 acres (0.53 ha)
- Built: 1894
- Architect: A. Page Brown; James H. Willis
- Architectural style: Romanesque
- Part of: Washington College Academy (ID02000812)
- NRHP reference No.: 92001255

Significant dates
- Added to NRHP: September 22, 1992
- Designated CP: July 17, 2002

Salem Presbyterian Church is a Presbyterian church at 147 Washington College Road at the Washington College Academy in Tennessee. It was started in 1894 and was added to the National Register of Historic Places in 1992.

== History ==
Salem Presbyterian Church is a historic church in Washington College, Limestone, Tennessee, affiliated with the Holston Presbytery and Presbyterian Church (USA).

The congregation was formed in 1780 under the leadership of Reverend Samuel Doak. It was the first Presbyterian church established in the area that later became the state of Tennessee. The congregation served the adjacent Washington College for many years before becoming a separate congregation.

Construction of the church's current building began in 1894. Its sanctuary has several large stained glass windows. It was designed by architect A. Page Brown.

The building was listed on the National Register of Historic Places in 1992. It was also included as a contributing property in the Washington College Historic District, which was listed in 2002.
