= Aquone =

Historic house in Tennessee, United States

- U.S. National Register of Historic Places
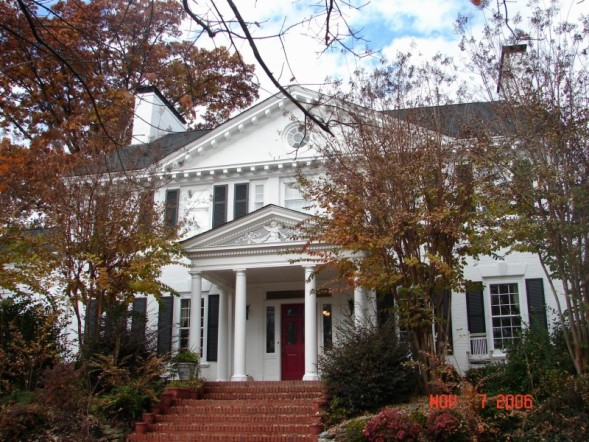

- Location within Tennessee Location within the United States
- Location: 110 Barberry Rd; Johnson City, Tennessee
- Coordinates: 36°19′37″N 82°22′03″W
- Area: 3.3 acres (1.3 ha)
- Built: 1925
- Architect: Leland Cardwell
- Architectural style: Colonial Revival
- NRHP reference No.: 93001199
- Added to NRHP: November 4, 1993

Aquone (pronounced uh-KWAN-nee) is the home in Johnson City, Tennessee, where Tennessee jurist and historian Samuel Cole Williams lived in retirement. The home is listed on the National Register of Historic Places.

Aquone was built in 1925. It is a 2 1/2-story brick structure in the Colonial Revival style. Leland Cardwell, a Johnson City architect, designed the house, modeling it after the design of an unidentified Colonial mansion built in Maryland in 1748. The house is on a 3.6-acre (1.5 ha) lot between Roan Street and U.S. Highway 11E, it is screened from those roads by trees and a terraced lawn. At the time of its construction, the site was north of the city limits of Johnson City.

The interior of Aquone is laid out according to the center hall plan, with an entrance hall, and stairway flanked by a large formal living room on one side and a large formal dining room on the other side. An unusual feature of the house is a one-and-one-half-story library that is said to have been modeled after Sir Walter Scott studied in his home at Abbotsford House. The living room and dining room both have fireplaces with Georgian-influenced mantels. The library fireplace also has a Georgian design.

The name "Aquone" is reported to be a Cherokee word for "resting place."
