= Plum Grove Archaeological Site =

- U.S. National Register of Historic Places
- Nearest city: Jonesborough, Tennessee
- Area: 54 acres (22 ha)
- NRHP reference No.: 85002353
- Added to NRHP: September 5, 1985

The Plum Grove Archaeological Site is a multi-component archaeological site in the northeastern part of the U.S. state of Tennessee. Located near the town of Jonesborough, it encompasses approximately 54 acres (22 ha) of land governed by the United States Forest Service. The site has yielded a wide range of artifacts; an excavation led by Anne Rogers produced household goods, potsherds, burials, middens, animal remains, and evidence of the location of houses. Plum Grove was occupied by many cultures for thousands of years; artifacts from the Archaic period have been found there, and it believed that the site was a large village even after the beginnings of European contact.

In recognition of its archaeological value, the Plum Grove Archaeological Site was listed on the National Register of Historic Places in 1985.
