= Sulphur Springs Methodist Campground =

Historic church in Tennessee, United States

- U.S. National Register of Historic Places
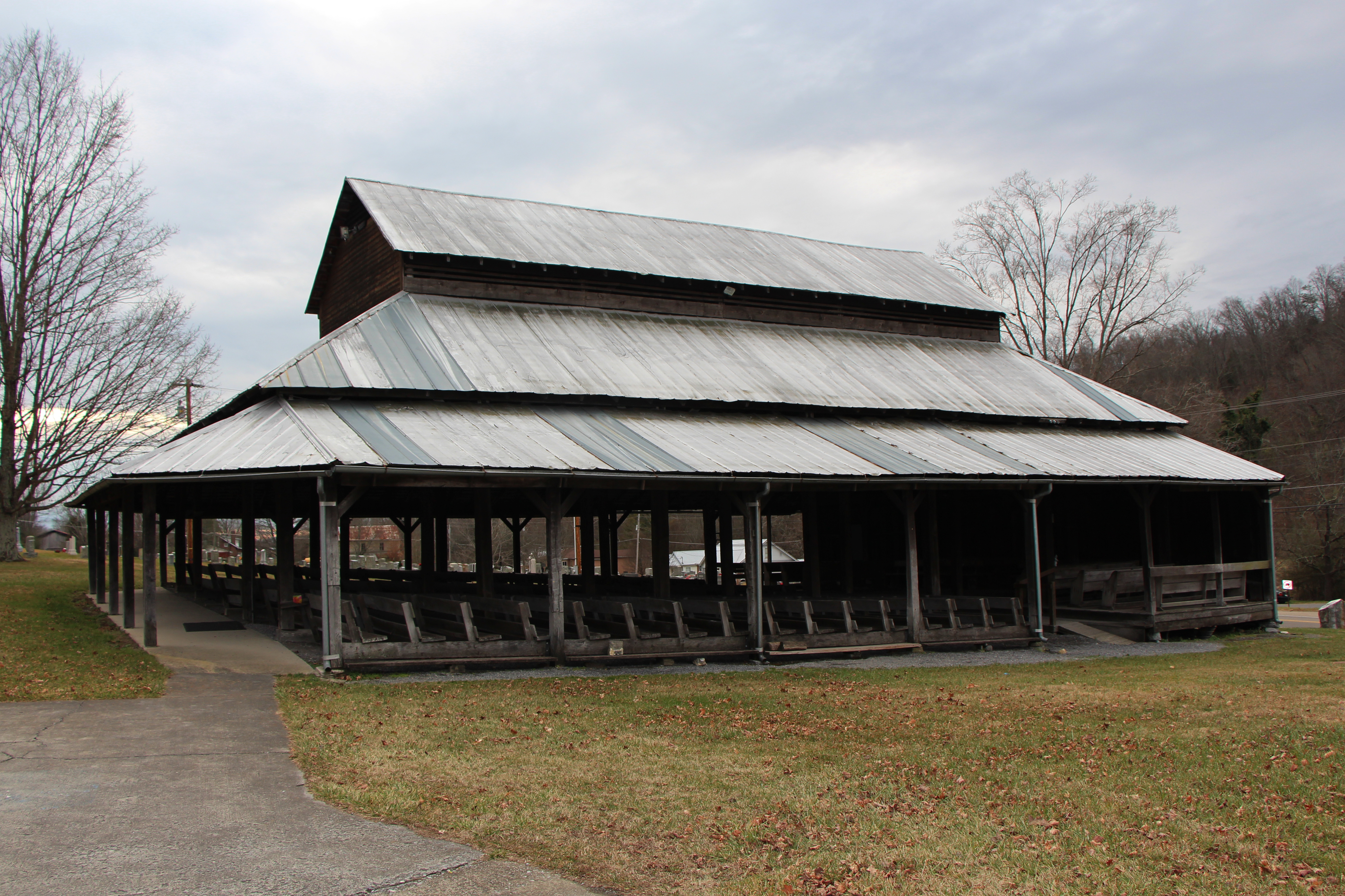
- Tabernacle building exterior

- Location within Tennessee Location within the United States
- Nearest city: Jonesboro, Tennessee
- Coordinates: 36°20′53″N 82°32′29″W
- Area: 1 acre (0.40 ha)
- Built: 1900
- NRHP reference No.: 75001796
- Added to NRHP: May 12, 1975

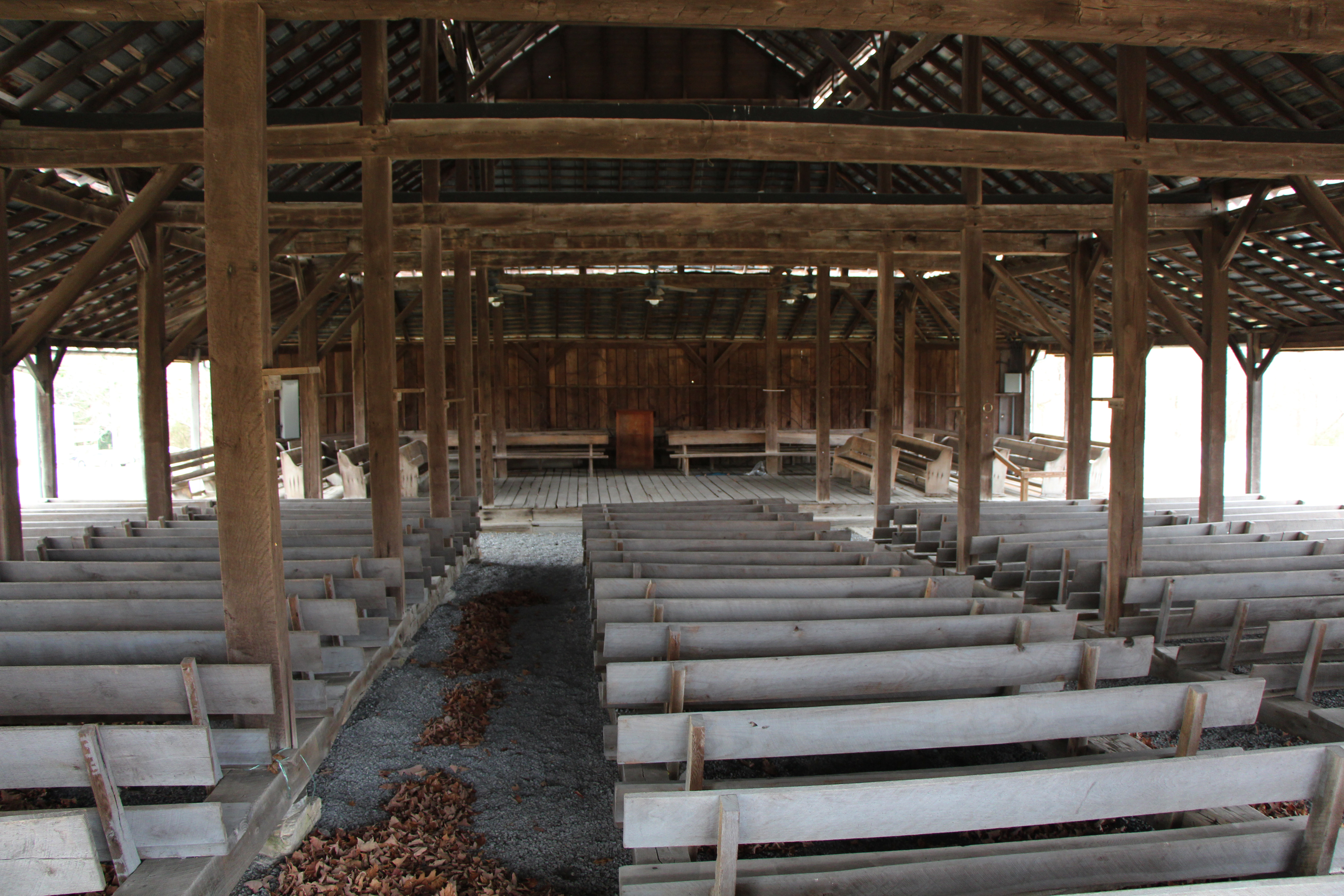
Sulphur Springs, Inside view

The Sulphur Springs Methodist Campground is a historic religious summer campground near Jonesborough, Tennessee.

This one-story open air camp meeting shed with gable on hipped roof is rectangular, measures approximately 72 x 45 feet, and has a nave plan. The structure is supported by hewn and pegged timber truss work. It features a stage, unfinished plank pews, and a packed earth and sawdust floor. Sulphur Springs Methodist Campground was founded following the Great Revival of 1800. First meetings here may have occurred as early as 1815. In 1842 temporary brush arbors were abandoned for a more permanent structural complex. The present Tabernacle as well as the other buildings, now extinct, were reconstructed according to the same plan and shape and utilizing the same materials in 1900.

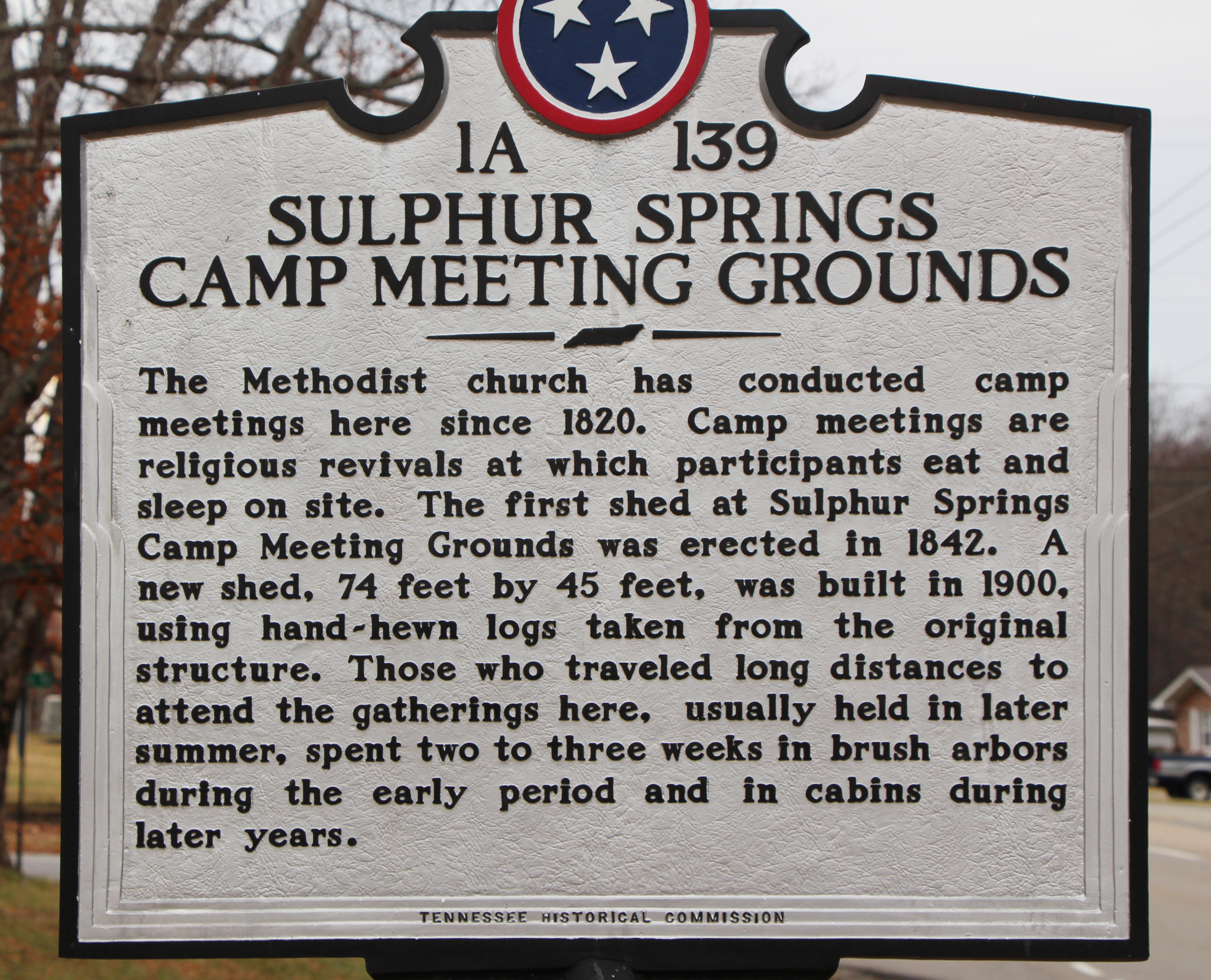
Sulphur Springs Plague
