= Washington College Academy =

Tennessee school founded 1870

Coordinates: 36.22030°N 82.57089°W

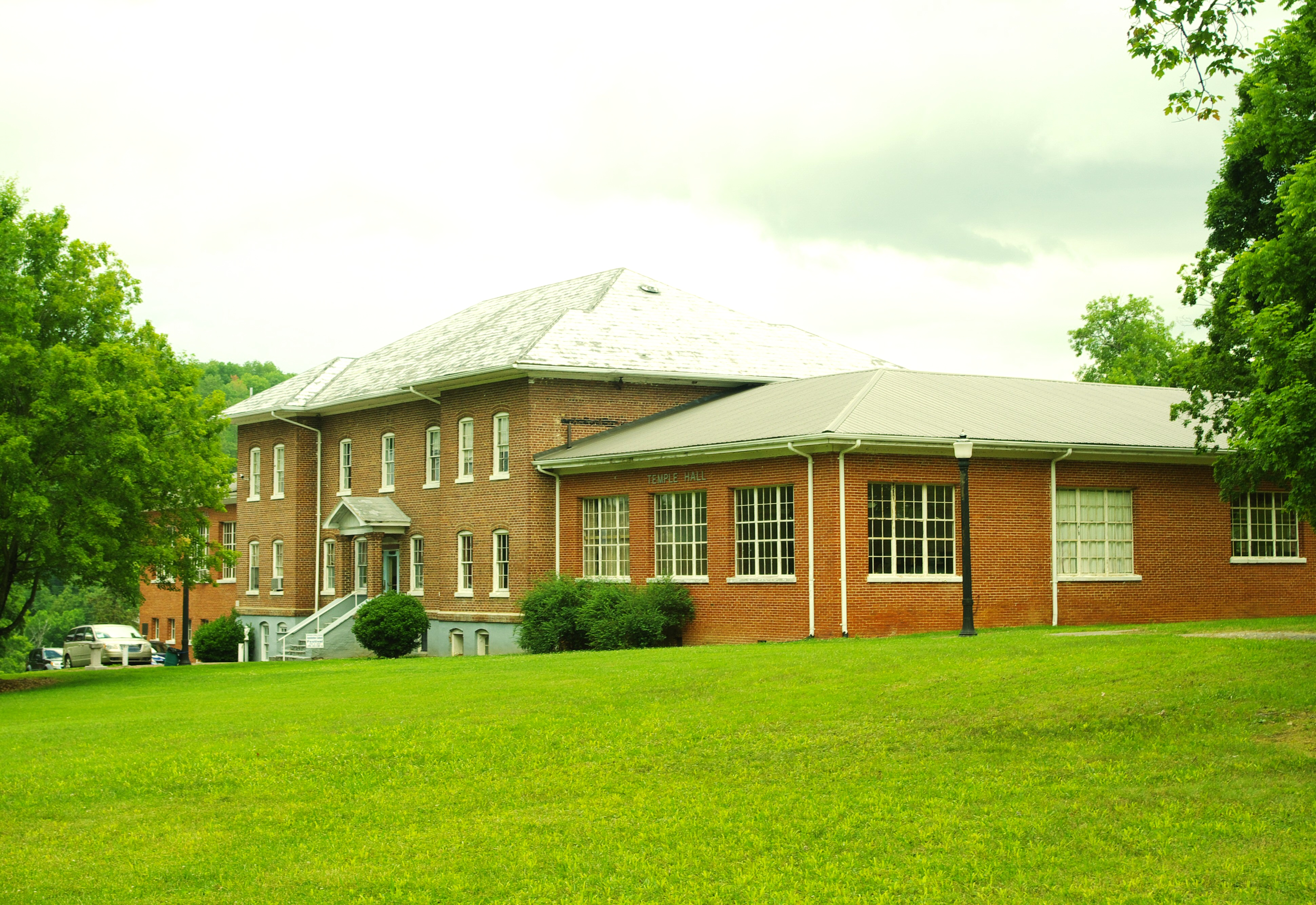
- Carnegie-Temple Hall
- Motto: The Light in the Wilderness
- Type: Private
- Established: 1780
- Affiliations: Presbyterian Church USA
- Students: n/a
- Location: Washington College, Limestone, Tennessee, USA
- Campus: Rural, 120 acres (0.49 km^{2})
- Website: wca1780.com
- Washington College Historic District
- U.S. National Register of Historic Places
- U.S. Historic district
- Location within Tennessee Location within the United States
- Location: 116 Doak Ln., Washington College, Tennessee
- Area: 44 acres (18 ha)
- Built: 1842–1952
- Architect: A. Page Brown, et al.
- Architectural style: Colonial Revival, Romanesque Revival, American Foursquare
- NRHP reference No.: 02000812
- Added to NRHP: July 17, 2002

Washington College Academy was a private Presbyterian-affiliated educational institution located in Washington College, Limestone, Tennessee. Founded in 1780 by Doctor of Divinity Samuel Doak, the academy for many years offered accredited college, junior college and college preparatory instruction to day and boarding students, but financial difficulties in the 2000s forced the school to restructure its offerings and focus instead on continuing education courses for adults.

Now, the Washington College Academy School for Arts & Crafts offers a variety of classes in metalsmithing, glass, clay, fiber, and mixed media. The academy also hosts a General Educational Development (GED) program to assist area residents in meeting the high school-level academic skills necessary for GED certification. The academy also offers baseball and softball facilities. The academy is also home to Washington county's most recent addition to the Northeast Tennessee Quilt Trail. Depicting a hand painted quilt square designed by artist Sharon Stone, "A Light in the Wilderness" is based on the original vision of Samuel Doak.

The first college established in Tennessee, Washington College was originally chartered as Martin Academy, when the state was still part of North Carolina. It was rechartered by the failed State of Franklin in 1785, and again by the Southwest Territory in 1795, when its name was changed to Washington College. The school prospered throughout the first half of the 19th century under the leadership of Doak and his grandson, Archibald Alexander Doak, and many of its graduates went on to become influential figures in regional politics. Ebenezer Baird was the college's president from 1850 until 1852.

Occupying Union and Confederate armies left its campus in ruins after the Civil War, but the college reorganized and gradually expanded during the 1870s and 1880s. The school had transitioned to a junior college by the early 20th century, and abandoned its college curriculum to focus on secondary education in the 1920s.

Most of the extant buildings on the academy's campus were constructed between 1842 and 1973. Nearly a dozen of these buildings, along with the adjacent Salem Presbyterian Church, are listed on the National Register of Historic Places as the Washington College Historic District.

== History ==
Samuel Doak, described by historian J. G. M. Ramsey as the "apostle of learning and religion in the west," arrived in the upper Tennessee Valley in 1777 as a Presbyterian circuit rider, and moved to what is now rural western Washington County shortly afterward. In 1780, he established the Salem Church congregation and an associated school, both of which met in a log building located on a lot roughly adjacent to what is now Harris Hall. In 1783, the North Carolina Assembly (modern Tennessee was still part of North Carolina at the time) chartered the school as "Martin Academy," named for North Carolina Governor Alexander Martin. Two years later, the school received a charter from the legislature of the "State of Franklin"—an ultimately unsuccessful attempt by North Carolina's trans-mountain settlers to form a new state. In 1795, the Southwest Territory, a federal territory that consisted of what is now Tennessee, rechartered the school as "Washington College." The legislation chartering the school was introduced by John Sevier, then a member of the territorial council, and its early trustees included several influential figures in early Tennessee history, among them Sevier, Doak, John Tipton, William Cocke, William C. C. Claiborne, Archibald Roane, John Rhea, and Gideon Blackburn.

Samuel Doak was succeeded as president of Washington College by his son, John W. Doak (1818–1820), and later by his grandson, Archibald Alexander Doak (1840–1850, 1853–1856). The school taught grade school, preparatory, and college-level courses, and began awarding Doctor of Divinity degrees in 1817. Girls likely attended the school's lower grades during its early years. The school experienced a period of prosperity in the 1840s, when the iconic red brick Harris Hall was completed, but financial struggles eventually forced Archibald Doak's resignation in 1856. The school's preparatory department became coeducational that same year.

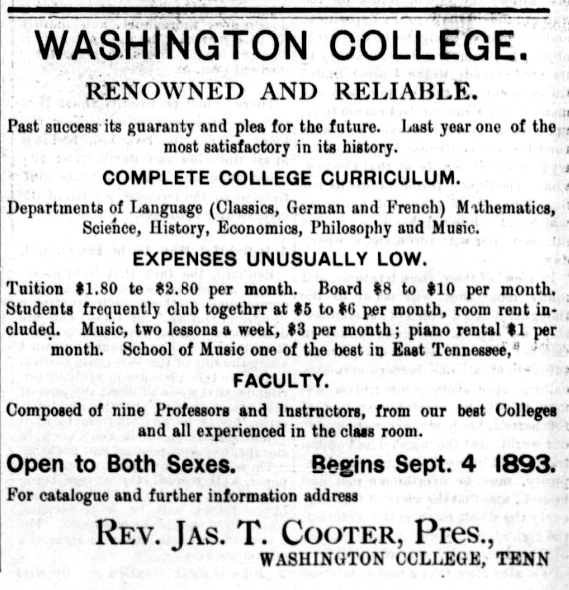
1893 ad for Washington College

During the Civil War, the school was forced to close, and its campus was occupied at times by both Confederate and Union troops. The first floor of Harris Hall was used as a stable, whereas the top floors were used for barracks. The library was destroyed, and the campus was largely left in ruins. Two local women, Eva and Addy Telford, used the campus as a school for women in the years following the war. In 1868, the school was reorganized as Washington Female Academy with William B. Rankin as president, but it was unable to obtain a charter. It afterward returned to its coeducational status, and in subsequent years repaired and expanded its campus.

By the 1880s, Washington College was again prospering under the presidency of J.W.C. Willoughby, reporting an enrollment of 148 in 1884. It began awarding Bachelor of Science, Bachelor of Arts, and Bachelor of Instruction degrees during this period. The YMCA and YWCA established organizations on campus, and a school newspaper, the Progressive Educator (later known as the Pioneer Educator) was launched in 1886. The 32-year presidency of James T. Cooter, which began in 1891, saw the school transition to a junior college. An industrial department was established, and a 135-acre (55 ha) farm was purchased in 1900. The school was one of the first in the area to obtain a telephone connection and electricity.

In 1908, the Presbyterian Church attempted to merge Washington College with nearby Tusculum College. Under the merger, Washington College would have become the new school's preparatory department. Washington's trustees sued to block the merger, and the Tennessee Supreme Court ruled in their favor, but the school's post-secondary department never fully recovered, and its collegiate curriculum was discontinued in 1923.

Washington College was forced to close during World War I, and afterward began seeking public funding. It started offering agricultural education in 1919 in order to obtain federal Smith-Hughes Act funds, and shortly afterward began teaching public school students as part of an agreement with Washington County. The school continued to receive substantial donations from benefactors such as Mary Copley Thaw and Mary Boyce Temple during the 1920s, but funding began to dry up during the Great Depression, forcing layoffs and salary cuts, and a reduction in work-study students.

During the years following World War II, the school experienced a resurgence under the presidency of Henry Jablonski. Several new buildings were constructed in the late 1950s, 1960s, and early 1970s, some of which were made possible by a large gift from the Harris family in 1966. With the completion of David Crockett High School in nearby Jonesborough in 1971, Washington College discontinued its public school program, and returned to its role as a private preparatory school for grades 7 through 12. The school severed its ties with the Presbyterian Church in 1972, and phased out its agricultural program in the late 1970s. Washington College Academy was open as a private boarding and day school from 1993 to 2000. The school closed again in late 2000 and has reopened again in the last few years as a local arts school. Today Washington College continues to offer quality education through a series of special programs offered to the community. It is becoming known as a center for the arts with diverse artistic talents. The school still operates a High School equivalency program (HiSet) and offers classes on Art, History, and Music for adults.

== Notable alumni ==
This section includes both college and high school alumni.

- Alexander O. Anderson, U.S. senator
- John Blair, U.S. congressman
- Samuel P. Carter, U.S. Navy Rear Admiral and U.S. Union Army Brevet Major General
- Robert L. Caruthers, U.S. congressman and Confederate Governor-elect of Tennessee
- Landon Carter Haynes, Confederate senator
- Frank Little, opera tenor
- Abraham McClellan, U.S. congressman
- J. G. M. Ramsey, historian
- John Rankin, educator and abolitionist
- Nathaniel Green Taylor, U.S. congressman
- Oliver Perry Temple, attorney, judge and historian
- Zebulon Vance, Governor of North Carolina
- Filip Videnov, professional basketball player
- Tilly Walker, Major League Baseball player
- Robert A. Young (1824-1902), Methodist minister.
- William Hugh Young, Confederate Army general
