= Washington College, Tennessee =

Unincorporated community in Tennessee, US

Coordinates: 36°13′12″N 82°34′18″W

Washington College is an unincorporated community in Washington County, Tennessee near Limestone. Washington College Academy and Salem Presbyterian Church are located in Washington College, both are listed on the National Register of Historic Places.
