= Thankful Baptist Church (Johnson City, Tennessee) =

Historic church in Tennessee, United States

- U.S. National Register of Historic Places
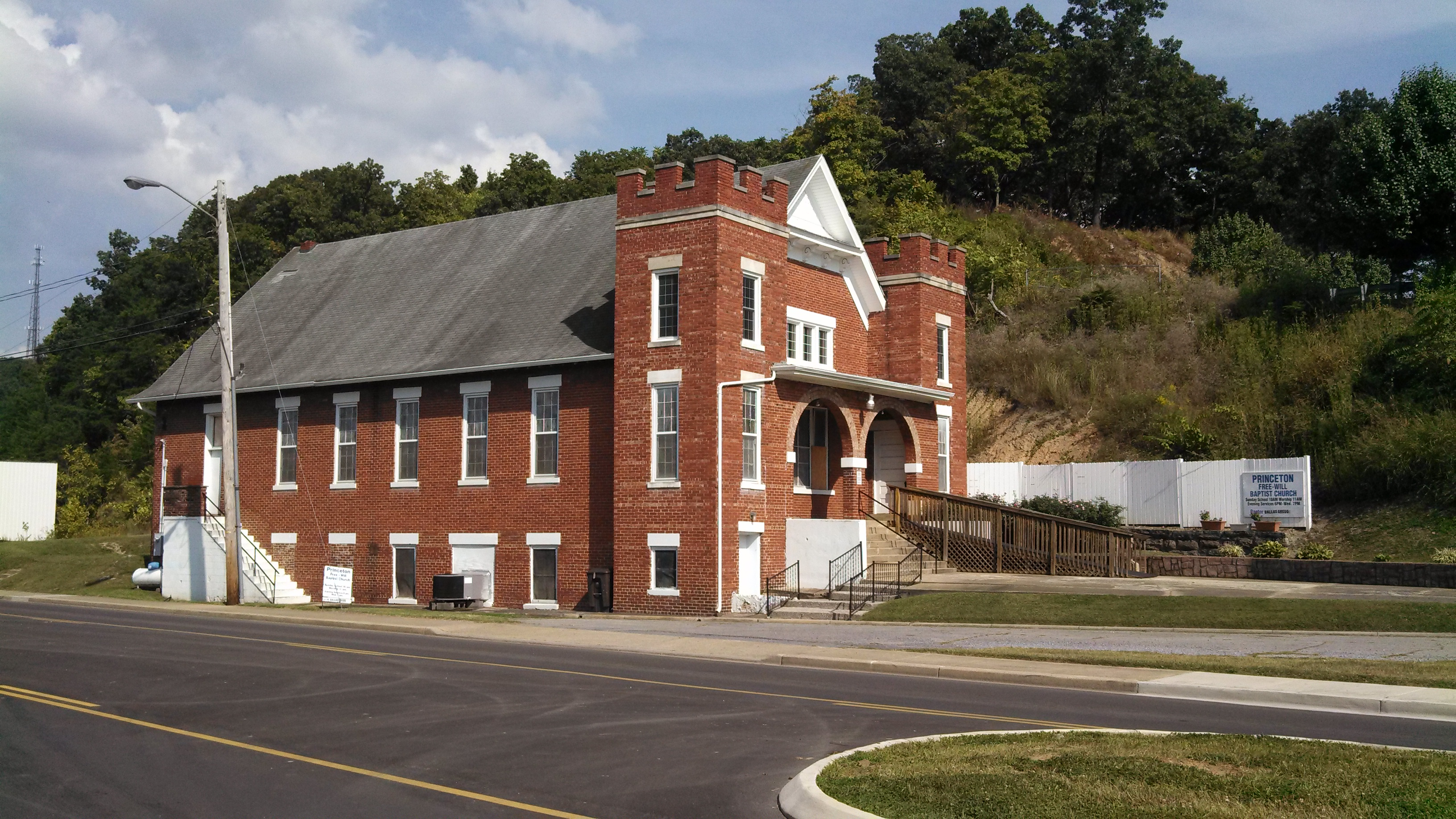

- Location within Tennessee Location within the United States
- Location: 104 Water St., Johnson City, Tennessee
- Coordinates: 36°19′10″N 82°21′4″W
- Area: less than one acre
- Built: 1912
- Architect: Janes, Hobart K.; Janes Construction Company
- Architectural style: Gothic Revival
- NRHP reference No.: 01000852
- Added to NRHP: August 08, 2001

Princeton Free Will Baptist Church, formerly Thankful Baptist Church, is a historic church building at 104 Water Street in Johnson City, Tennessee.

The brick church was built in 1912 to serve Thankful Baptist Church, an African-American congregation. Thankful Baptist Church moved to a new location on Watauga Avenue in 1975. In 1977, the congregation sold the Water Street church property to Princeton Free Will Baptist Church.

The building was added to the National Register of Historic Places in 2001.
