= Limestone, Tennessee =

Town in Tennessee, United States

Coordinates: 36°13′41″N 82°37′50″W

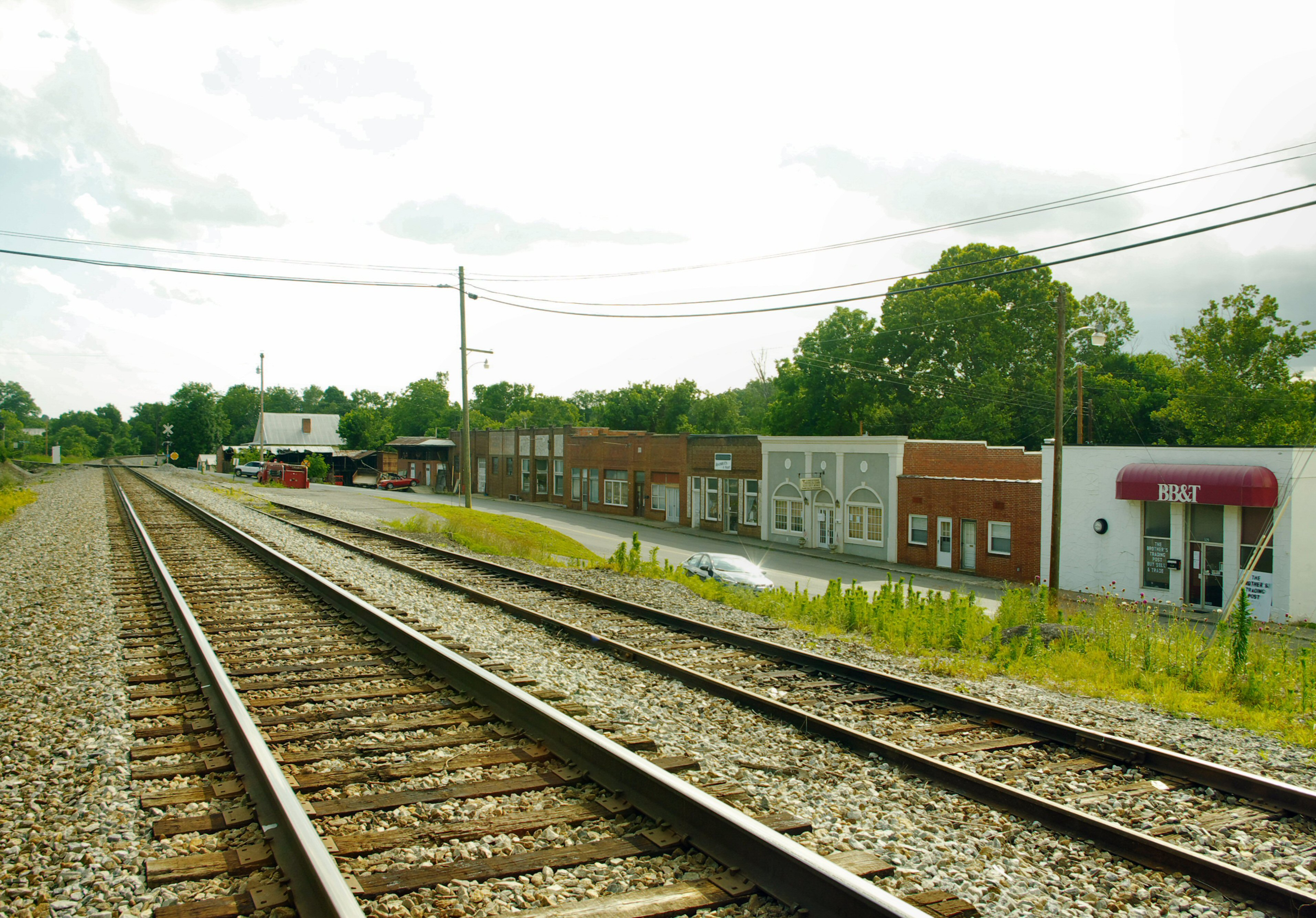
Norfolk Southern tracks and storefronts along Big Limestone Road

Limestone is an unincorporated community on the western border of Washington County and the eastern border of Greene County in the northeastern part of the U.S. state of Tennessee. Its zip code is 37681. Limestone is part of the Johnson City Metropolitan Statistical Area, which is a component of the Johnson City-Kingsport-Bristol, TN-VA Combined Statistical Area – commonly known as the "Tri-Cities" region.

== History ==
Washington College Academy was founded in Limestone in 1780 by Rev. Samuel Doak, and was the first institution to bear the name of the first American president. Limestone was the birthplace of David Crockett (1786) to John and Rebecca Crockett. The Gillespie House, built in 1792 by pioneer settler George Gillespie, still stands in Limestone. One of the locations used in the TV movie Goodbye, Miss 4th of July (1988) was the Old Stone House in Limestone.

== Education ==
Students in the Washington County portion attend:

- West View Elementary School (Grades PK-8)
- Grandview Elementary School (Grades PK-8)
- David Crockett High School (Grades 9-12)

Students in the Greene County portion attend:

- Chuckey Elementary School (Grades PK-5; Located in nearby Chuckey)
- Chuckey-Doak Middle School (Grades 6–8; Located in Afton)
- Chuckey-Doak High School (Grades 9-12; Located in Afton)

Washington College Academy is located in the Washington College area of Limestone.

== Postal service ==
Limestone has its own post office and ZIP code (37681). The post office is located at 359 Opie Arnold Road, Limestone, Tennessee 37681, in the Washington County portion of the community.

== Recreation ==
David Crockett Birthplace State Park is located in the western portion of Limestone. The park provides camping, picnicking and other recreational activities, and includes a replica of Crockett's birth cabin and a small museum.

== Notable people ==
- Glenn D. Broyles, member of the Tennessee House of Representatives, 1969–1972 was born in Limestone.
- Tilly Walker, outfielder for 1916 World Series champion Boston Red Sox, was raised in Limestone.
- Davy Crockett, soldier, folk hero, frontiersman & politician was born in Limestone.
- Samuel Doak (1749–1830) was an American Presbyterian clergyman and Calvinist educator.
- Daisy May Moses, fictional main character more popularly known as "Granny" and "Granny Clampett" from the television sitcom The Beverly Hillbillies that was broadcast by CBS from 1962 to 1971 and played by actress Irene Ryan.
