= Cattle Creek Campground =

- U.S. National Register of Historic Places
- U.S. Historic district
- Location within South Carolina Location within the United States
- Nearest city: Rowesville, South Carolina
- Coordinates: 33°19′20″N 80°45′8″W
- Area: 5.4 acres (2.2 ha)
- Built: 1899
- NRHP reference No.: 83002204
- Added to NRHP: May 19, 1983

Cattle Creek Campground, also known as Cattle Creek Community Methodist Church and Campground, is a historic camp meeting ground that is now a national historic district located near Rowesville, Orangeburg County, South Carolina. The 2-acre tract was deeded to the trustees of the Methodist Episcopal Church by George Summers Sr and his wife May in July, 1833. The district encompasses 37 contributing buildings and 1 contributing site. It was founded in 1786, although this date has been challenged. The campground burned in 1898 and was rebuilt. Another fire in 2017 destroyed 15 "tents," which were again rebuilt. It includes 36 cabins, called “tents,” arranged in a wide semi-circle. They are located around an open, 56 feet by 81 feet, pavilion structure known as the “stand” or “tabernacle.” Also located on the property is a cemetery. It is one of three remaining Methodist campgrounds in South Carolina.

It was added to the National Register of Historic Places in 1983.

== See also ==
- Camp Welfare: AME Zion camp meeting ground in Fairfield County, South Carolina
- Cypress Camp Ground: Methodist camp meeting ground in Dorchester County, South Carolina
- Indian Fields Campground: Methodist camp meeting ground in Dorchester County, South Carolina
- Mount Carmel Campground: AME Zion camp meeting ground in Lancaster County, South Carolina
- St. Paul Camp Ground: AME camp meeting ground in Dorchester County, South Carolina
