= St. Paul Camp Ground =

- U.S. National Register of Historic Places
- U.S. Historic district
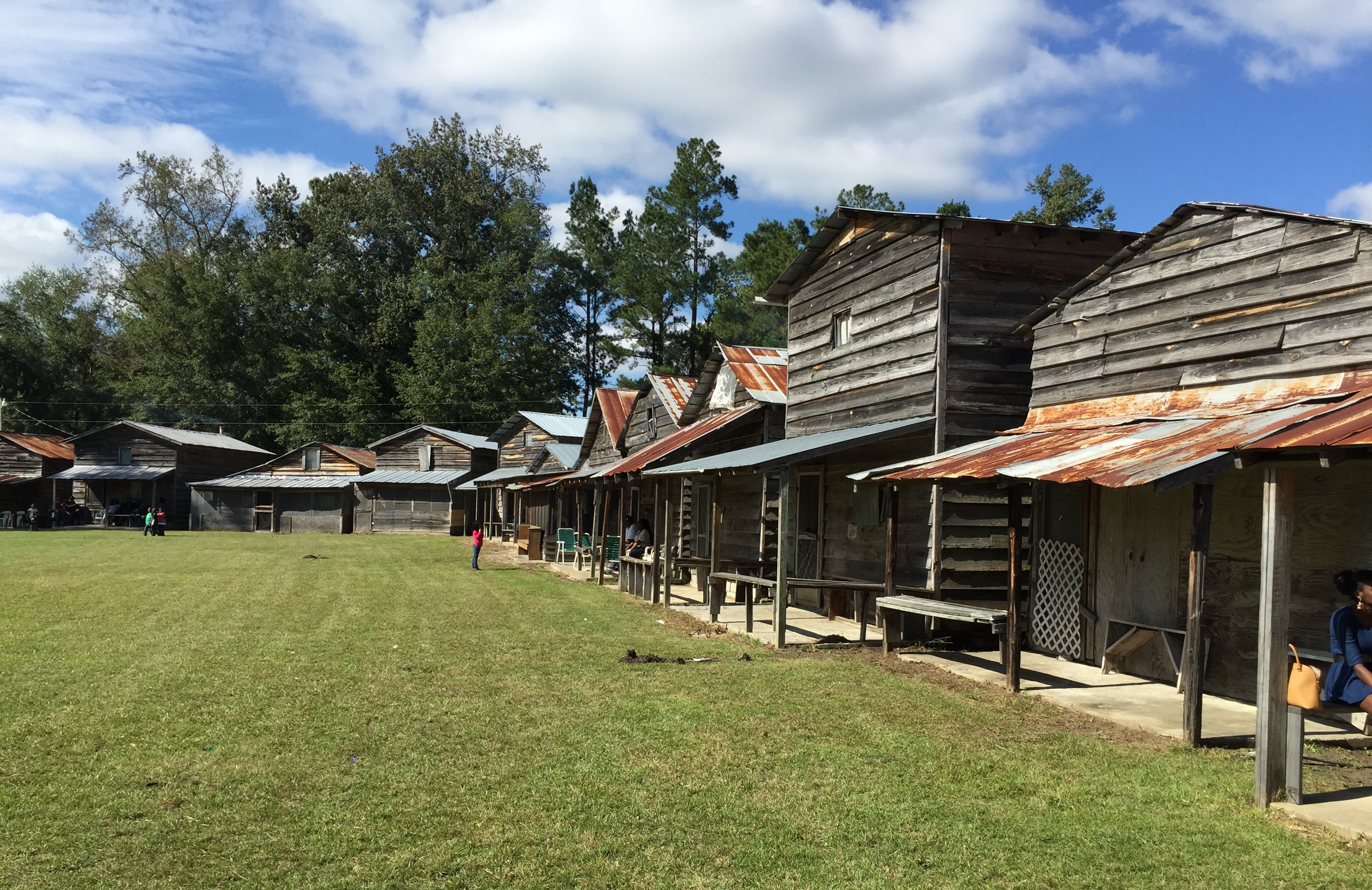

- Location within South Carolina Location within the United States
- Location: 940 St. Paul Rd., near Harleyville, South Carolina
- Coordinates: 33°12′17″N 80°28′57″W
- Area: 9 acres (3.6 ha)
- NRHP reference No.: 98000424
- Added to NRHP: April 30, 1998

St. Paul Camp Ground, also known as St. Paul A.M.E. Camp Ground, is a historic African Methodist Episcopal camp meeting and national historic district located near Harleyville, Dorchester County, South Carolina. The district encompasses 43 contributing buildings. It was established about 1880, and the buildings and grounds are used for one week each year. The tabernacle is a one-story building clad in rough-sawn weatherboard. Also on the property are 54 tents, two stores, and a storage house.

It was added to the National Register of Historic Places in 1998.

== See also ==
- Camp Welfare: AME Zion camp meeting ground in Fairfield County, South Carolina
- Cattle Creek Campground: United Methodist camp meeting ground in Orangeburg County, South Carolina
- Cypress Camp Ground: Methodist camp meeting ground in Dorchester County, South Carolina
- Indian Fields Campground: Methodist camp meeting ground in Dorchester County, South Carolina
- Mount Carmel Campground: AME Zion camp meeting ground in Lancaster County, South Carolina
