= Methodist Tabernacle =

Methodist Tabernacle may refer to:

- Tabernacle (Methodist), the central part of a camp meeting
  - Methodist Tabernacle (Columbus, Georgia), listed on the National Register of Historic Places in Muscogee County, Georgia
  - Methodist Tabernacle (Mathews, Virginia), listed on the National Register of Historic Places in Mathews County, Virginia
