= Center Arbor =

Historic church in North Carolina, United States

- U.S. National Register of Historic Places
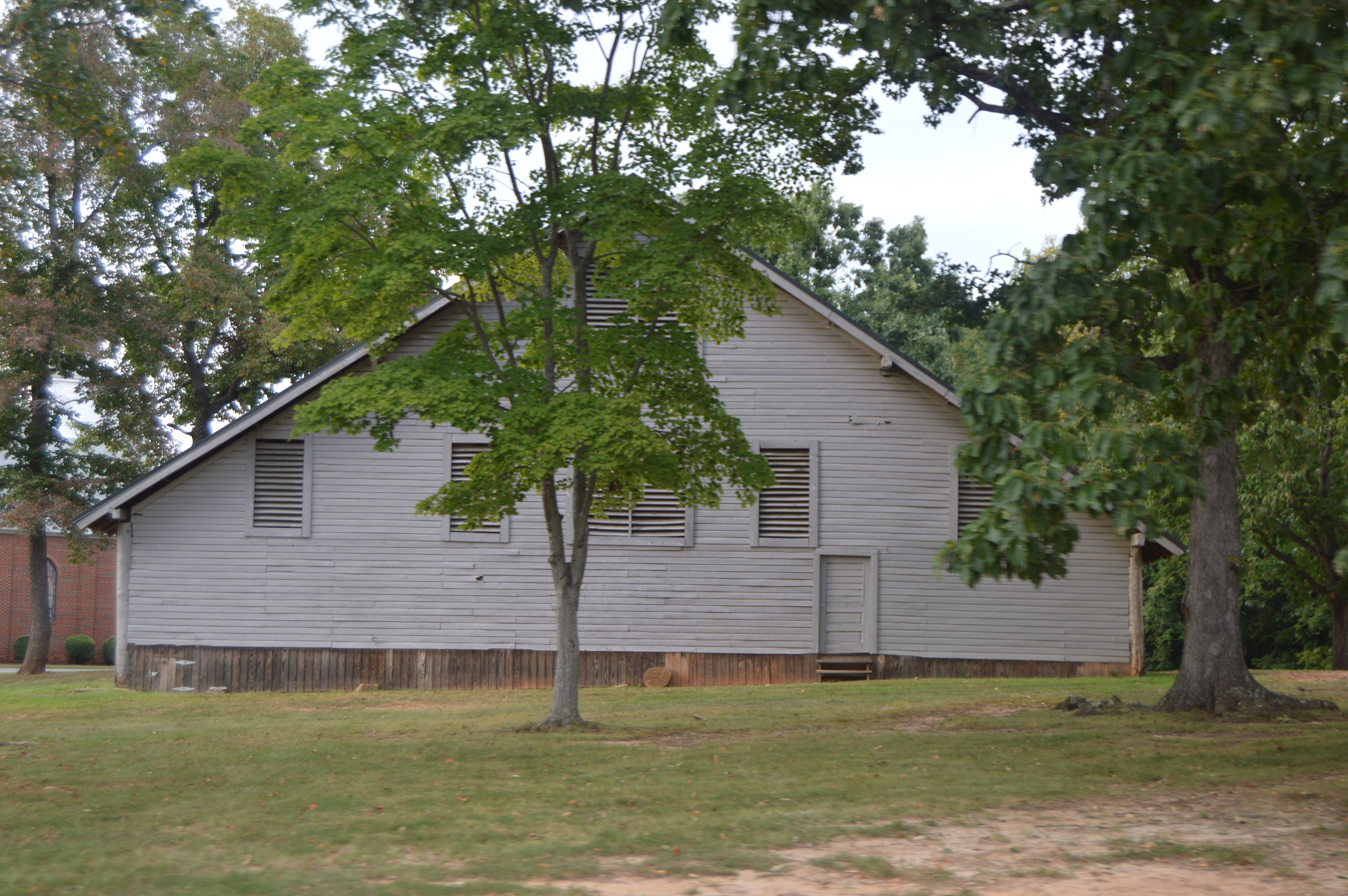
- Southern end

- Location within North Carolina Location within the United States
- Location: Jct. of US 64 and NC 1150, NW corner, Center, North Carolina
- Coordinates: 35°54′42″N 80°37′14″W
- Area: 1.1 acres (0.45 ha)
- Built: 1876
- NRHP reference No.: 91001168
- Added to NRHP: September 3, 1991

Center Arbor is a historic Methodist tabernacle located at Center, Davie County, North Carolina. It was built in 1876, and is a large, open, rectangular timber-framed structure four bays wide and eight bays deep. It measures approximately 60 feet wide and 80 feet deep. The tabernacle is associated with Center United Methodist Church and was the site of camp meeting revivals.

It was added to the National Register of Historic Places in 1991.

== See also ==
- Balls Creek Campground
- Ocean Grove Camp Meeting Association
- Chapel Hill Church Tabernacle
- Pleasant Grove Camp Meeting Ground
