= Cypress Methodist Camp Ground =

- U.S. National Register of Historic Places
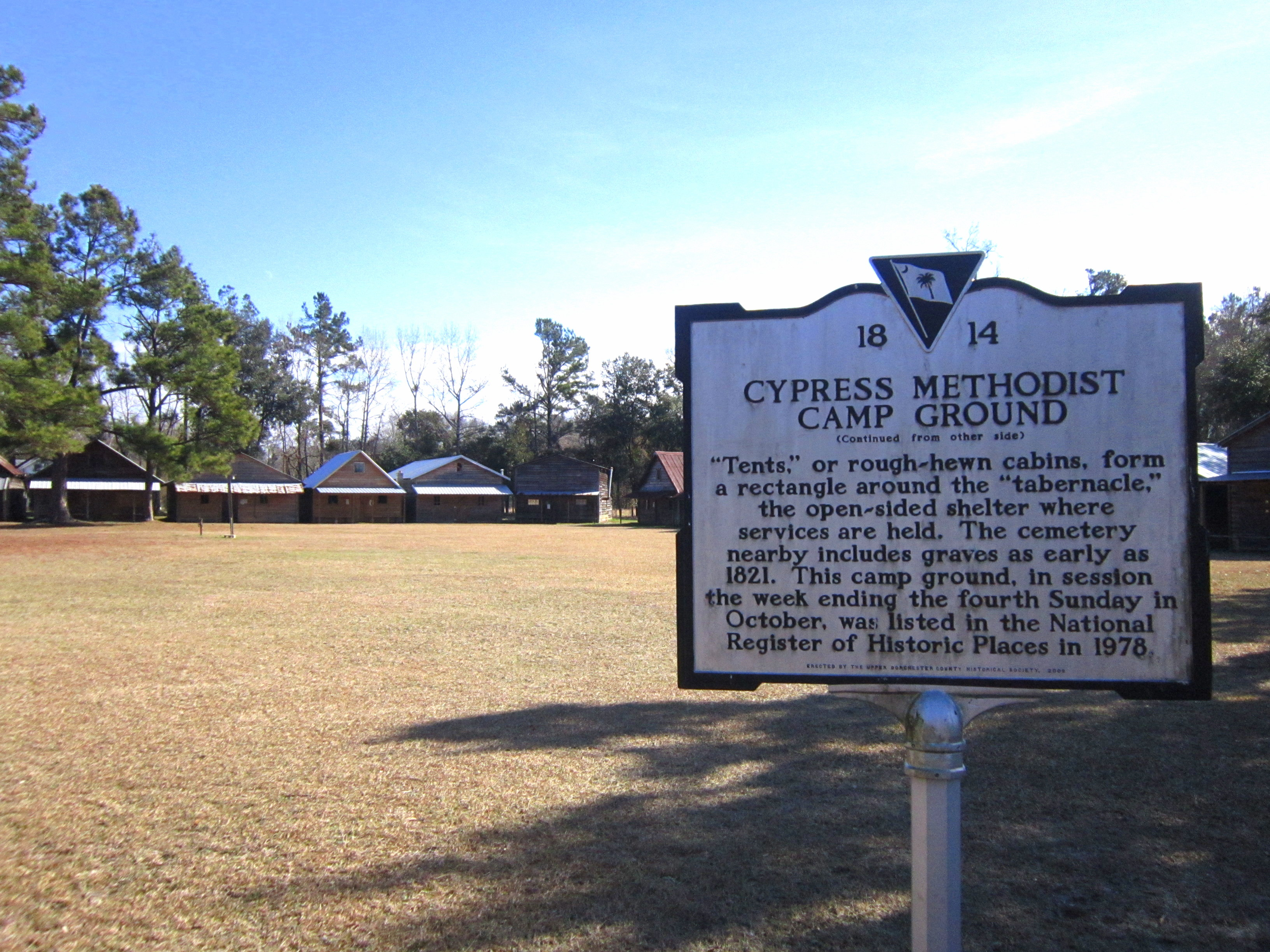

- Location within South Carolina Location within the United States
- Location: East of Ridgeville on South Carolina Highway 182, near Ridgeville, South Carolina
- Coordinates: 33°6′18″N 80°10′27″W
- Area: 9.1 acres (3.7 ha)
- NRHP reference No.: 78002504
- Added to NRHP: April 26, 1978

Cypress Methodist Camp Ground is a historic Methodist camp meeting in Ridgeville, Dorchester County, South Carolina. Cypress Camp Ground was functional as early as 1794, and an adjacent cemetery contains graves from the early 1800s. The campground is in the general shape of a rectangle of 34 tents, or cabins, made of rough-hewn lumber. These cabins, rectangular shaped, are generally 1 1/2-stories and contain earthen floors.

It was added to the National Register of Historic Places in 1978.

== See also ==
- Camp Welfare: AME Zion camp meeting ground in Fairfield County, South Carolina
- Cattle Creek Campground: Methodist camp meeting ground in Orangeburg County, South Carolina
- Indian Fields Campground: Methodist camp meeting ground in Dorchester County, South Carolina
- Mount Carmel Campground: AME Zion camp meeting ground in Lancaster County, South Carolina
- St. Paul Camp Ground: AME camp meeting ground in Dorchester County, South Carolina
