= Mount Carmel A.M.E. Zion Campground =

Historic church in South Carolina, United States

- Mount Carmel A.M.E. Zion Church Campground
- U.S. National Register of Historic Places
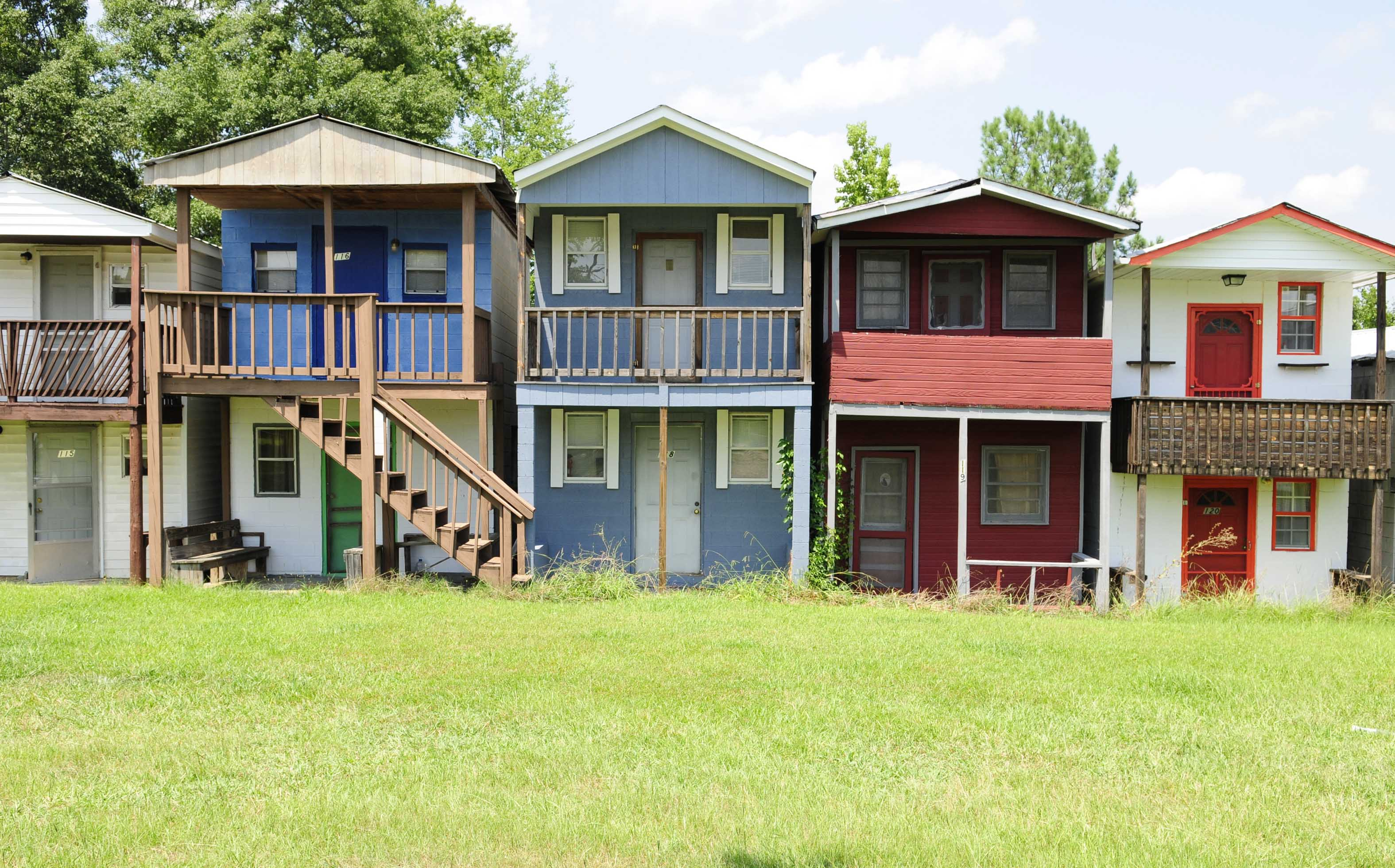

- Location within South Carolina Location within the United States
- Nearest city: Lancaster, South Carolina
- Coordinates: 34°35′47″N 80°46′45″W
- Area: 7.4 acres (3.0 ha)
- Built: 1866
- Architect: Multiple
- NRHP reference No.: 79002386
- Added to NRHP: May 10, 1979

Mount Carmel A.M.E. Zion Church & Campground is a historic African Methodist Episcopal Zion camp meeting grounds in Heath Springs, South Carolina, Lancaster County, South Carolina. It was established in 1866 and consists of a complex of approximately 55 small "cabins" or "tents" and the brick church of Mt. Carmel A.M.E. Zion Church is located in the general form of a rectangle. Mount Carmel A.M.E Zion Church Campmeeting starts every year on the first Wednesday in September, and last for 4–5 days. An arbor, or open-air structure, is located in the center of the complex, where music, gospel singing, praise and worship, preaching and teachings are held. People come to worship, fellowship, network, and eat food from as far as New York City, NY to Orlando, FL. There is also a section on the grounds for vendors. The majority of the cabins are small frame, some are two story cabins for larger families made from concrete block and wooden structures. Also on the property is the church cemetery.

It was added to the National Register of Historic Places in 1979.

== See also ==
- Camp Welfare: AME Zion camp meeting ground in Fairfield County, South Carolina
- Cattle Creek Campground: United Methodist camp meeting ground in Orangeburg County, South Carolina
- Cypress Camp Ground: Methodist camp meeting ground in Dorchester County, South Carolina
- Indian Fields Campground: Methodist camp meeting ground in Dorchester County, South Carolina
- St. Paul Camp Ground: AME camp meeting ground in Dorchester County, South Carolina
