= Chapel Hill Church Tabernacle =

Historic church in North Carolina, United States

- U.S. National Register of Historic Places
- Location within North Carolina Location within the United States
- Location: 1457 Chapel Hill Church Rd., near Denton, North Carolina
- Coordinates: 35°33′13″N 80°04′16″W
- Area: Less than 1 acre
- Built: 1870, c. 1920s
- NRHP reference No.: 12000235
- Added to NRHP: May 24, 2012

Chapel Hill Church Tabernacle is a historic Methodist church tabernacle located near Denton, Davidson County, North Carolina. It was built in 1870 and enlarged in the 1920s. It is a one-story, heavy-timber, open-framework building, open on three sides. It has a concrete floor and a gable-on-hip roof. The tabernacle was originally used for the religious services at the annual camp meetings. The tabernacle is located on the grounds of Chapel Hill United Methodist Church, whose congregation dates from 1854.

It was added to the National Register of Historic Places in 2012.

== See also ==
- Balls Creek Campground
- Ocean Grove Camp Meeting Association
- Center Arbor
- Pleasant Grove Camp Meeting Ground
