= Indian Fields Methodist Campground =

Historic church in South Carolina, United States

- Indian Field Methodist Campground
- U.S. National Register of Historic Places
- U.S. Historic district
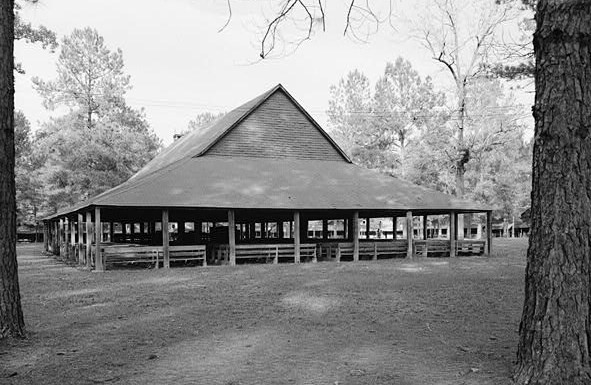
- The Tabernacle at the Indian Field Methodist Campground

- Location within South Carolina Location within the United States
- Nearest city: St. George, South Carolina
- Coordinates: 33°13′22″N 80°32′46″W
- Built: 1848
- NRHP reference No.: 73001707
- Added to NRHP: March 30, 1973

Indian Field Methodist Campground is a Methodist campground in Dorchester County, South Carolina at which camp meetings are held. It is on SC Route S-18-73, off US Route 15, about 5 mi (8 km) north of Saint George. Indian Field was built in 1848 and has been a site for religious gatherings for over 160 years. It is associated with the Indian Field Methodist Church located on U.S. Highway 15 about 2 miles (3 km) north of the campground and just south of U.S. Highway 178. It was named a historic district of the National Register of Historic Places on March 30, 1973.

== History ==
Religious camp meetings played an important role in the growth of some Protestant denominations in the early 19th century in rural parts of the United States. These meetings served a much wider population than a single church. Camp meetings usually lasted around a week and were social as well as religious occasions for the participants. A typical camp meeting site started with a brush arbor surrounded by tents and wagons. Often a chapel or tabernacle was built to replace the arbor and wooden cabins called "tents" were built to replace actual tents.

The Indian Field Methodist Church is located on U.S. Highway 15 about 2 miles (3 km) north of the campground and just south of U.S. Highway 178. This church began in 1787. Its first building was about 3 mi (5 km) east of the unincorporated Rosinville community at the intersection of U.S. Highways 15 and 178. The second church was built around 1819 near the current church. The third church was finished in 1886. The current church was completed in 1955.

The first Indian Field Campground was held on a farm in the late 18th century. It was probably located near the first church building. Bishop Francis Asbury noted in his journal that he preached at "Indian Fields" on December 21, 1801 and January 13, 1803. His journal does not say if he preached at the campground or the church. Other sources indicate that this campground was established in 1810.

In 1838, the campground was moved to the present site. The existing campground was constructed in 1848. It was restored in 1970.

On February 25, 1995, an intentional fire burned several structures at the campground. The person who set the fire was never apprehended.

== Architecture ==
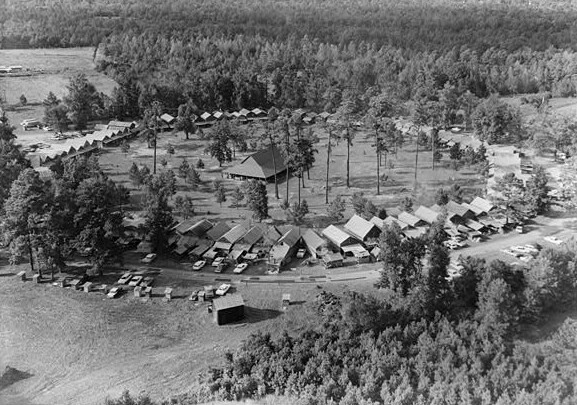
Aerial view of the Indian Field Methodist Campground

The existing campground consists of the central tabernacle surrounded by ninety-nine cabins of wooden construction. These cabins are referred to as "tents". Although is frequently stated that the tents are arrayed in a circle, they are actually arranged roughly in an octagon.

The tabernacle is a wooden pavilion with a gablet roof. The roof has exposed rafters and is supported by wooden posts. The pavilion has a raised preacher's stand at its northern end and three sections of wooden pews. It seats over 1,000.

The "tents" have a metal roof and are of two stories. The internal layout of each tent varies, but typically each has two upstairs bedrooms with a central stairway. The downstairs usually has a dining area towards the front and another bedroom at the rear. Historically the occupants of the upstairs bedrooms were divided by gender, while the downstairs bedroom was reserved for the older members of the family. The downstairs rooms may be connected with a hallway, or the rooms may have individual exterior doors. The downstairs areas have dirt floors that are typically covered with straw during camp meetings. The cooking area is below a shed attached to the rear of the tent. There is a wood-burning brick or cinderblock fireplace under the cook shed, and usually a small room for the cook's quarters. A typical floor plan of the larger cabin has been published.

The single-story preacher's cabin is larger and taller than the other cabins. It has a four-panel door flanked by two-over-two light windows.

There is a paved road around the campground. Outside this road, each cabin has a privy. Historically there were shared water wells in front of the cabins and stands for blazing pine knots to light the area at dark, however currently each tent has water and electric service.

Additional pictures of the campground have been published.

== See also ==
- Camp Welfare: AME Zion camp meeting ground in Fairfield County, South Carolina
- Cattle Creek Campground: Methodist camp meeting ground in Orangeburg County, South Carolina
- Cypress Camp Ground: Methodist camp meeting ground in Dorchester County, South Carolina
- Mount Carmel Campground: AME Zion camp meeting ground in Lancaster County, South Carolina
- St. Paul Camp Ground: AME camp meeting ground in Dorchester County, South Carolina
