= Rowesville, South Carolina =

- Town
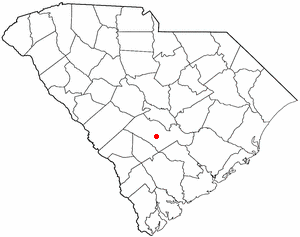
- Location of Rowesville, South Carolina
- Coordinates: 33°22′28″N 80°50′10″W
- Country: United States
- State: South Carolina
- County: Orangeburg

Area
  - Total: 0.83 sq mi (2.16 km^{2})
  - Land: 0.83 sq mi (2.16 km^{2})
  - Water: 0 sq mi (0.00 km^{2})
- Elevation: 167 ft (51 m)

Population (2020)
  - Total: 253
  - Density: 303.3/sq mi (117.12/km^{2})
- Time zone: UTC-5 (Eastern (EST))
  - Summer (DST): UTC-4 (EDT)
- ZIP code: 29133
- Area codes: 803, 839
- FIPS code: 45-62035
- GNIS feature ID: 2407251
- Website: https://rowesville.org/

Rowesville is a town in Orangeburg County, South Carolina, United States. As of the 2020 census, Rowesville had a population of 253.

== History ==
Cattle Creek Campground was listed on the National Register of Historic Places in 1983.

== Geography ==
According to the United States Census Bureau, the town has a total area of 0.8 square mile (2.0 km^{2}), all land.

== Demographics ==
Historical population
Census	Pop.	Note	%±
1880	125		—
1890	174		39.2%
1900	252		44.8%
1910	508		101.6%
1920	425		−16.3%
1930	400		−5.9%
1940	402		0.5%
1950	363		−9.7%
1960	398		9.6%
1970	392		−1.5%
1980	388		−1.0%
1990	316		−18.6%
2000	378		19.6%
2010	304		−19.6%
2020	253		−16.8%
U.S. Decennial Census

=== 2020 census ===
Rowesville town, South Carolina – Racial and ethnic composition Note: the US Census treats Hispanic/Latino as an ethnic category. This table excludes Latinos from the racial categories and assigns them to a separate category. Hispanics/Latinos may be of any race.
Race / Ethnicity (NH = Non-Hispanic)	Pop 2000	Pop 2010	Pop 2020	% 2000	% 2010	% 2020
White alone (NH)	146	121	107	38.62%	39.80%	42.29%
Black or African American alone (NH)	229	175	118	60.58%	57.57%	46.64%
Native American or Alaska Native alone (NH)	0	2	0	0.00%	0.66%	0.00%
Asian alone (NH)	0	0	0	0.00%	0.00%	0.00%
Native Hawaiian or Pacific Islander alone (NH)	0	0	0	0.00%	0.00%	0.00%
Other race alone (NH)	0	0	0	0.00%	0.00%	0.00%
Mixed race or Multiracial (NH)	0	2	15	0.00%	0.66%	5.93%
Hispanic or Latino (any race)	3	4	13	0.79%	1.32%	5.14%
Total	378	304	253	100.00%	100.00%	100.00%

=== 2000 census ===
As of the census of 2000, there were 378 people, 140 households, and 102 families residing in the town. The population density was 476.2 inhabitants per square mile (183.9/km^{2}). There were 159 housing units at an average density of 200.3 per square mile (77.3/km^{2}). The racial makeup of the town was 60.85% African American, 38.89% White, and 0.26% from two or more races. Hispanic or Latino of any race were 0.79% of the population.

There were 140 households, out of which 30.0% had children under the age of 18 living with them, 42.1% were married couples living together, 22.9% had a female householder with no husband present, and 27.1% were non-families. 22.1% of all households were made up of individuals, and 12.9% had someone living alone who was 65 years of age or older. The average household size was 2.68 and the average family size was 3.11.

In the town, the population was spread out, with 25.9% under the age of 18, 8.5% from 18 to 24, 29.4% from 25 to 44, 22.5% from 45 to 64, and 13.8% who were 65 years of age or older. The median age was 34 years. For every 100 females, there were 102.1 males. For every 100 females age 18 and over, there were 100.0 males.

The median income for a household in the town was $30,833, and the median income for a family was $36,250. Males had a median income of $24,500 versus $16,591 for females. The per capita income for the town was $13,978. About 12.5% of families and 20.6% of the population were below the poverty line, including 39.7% of those under age 18 and 23.4% of those age 65 or over.
