= Camp Welfare =

- U.S. National Register of Historic Places
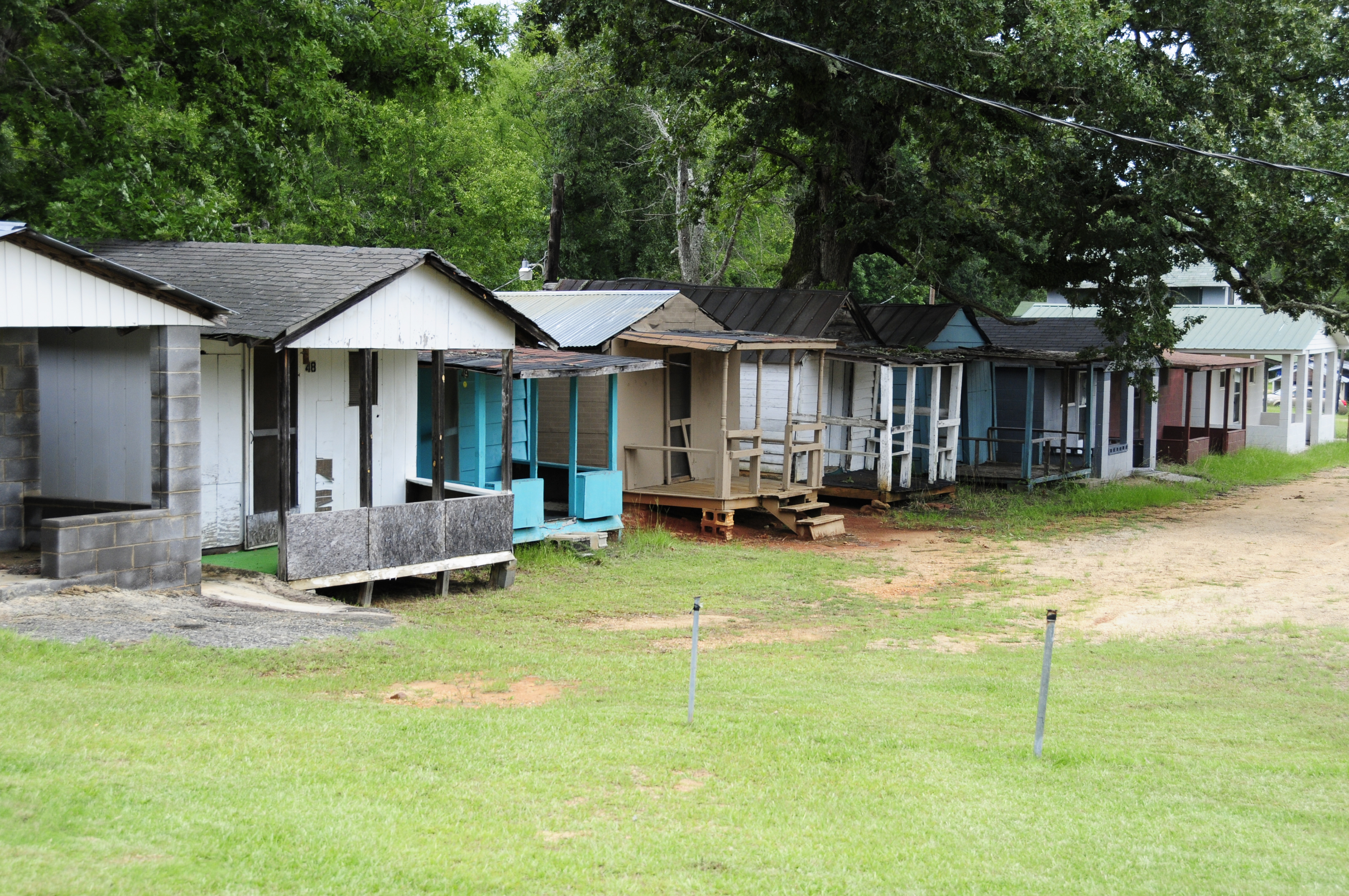
- Camp Welfare, July 2012

- Location within South Carolina Location within the United States
- Location: Off U.S. Route 21, near Ridgeway, South Carolina
- Coordinates: 34°29′23″N 80°57′04″W
- Area: 11 acres (4.5 ha)
- Built: c. 1900, c. 1930
- Architect: Multiple
- MPS: Fairfield County MRA
- NRHP reference No.: 84000586
- Added to NRHP: December 6, 1984

Camp Welfare is a historic African-American religious campground located near Winnsboro, South Carolina Fairfield County, South Carolina. It was founded after the American Civil War by the African Methodist Episcopal Zion Church. It is a collection of approximately 100 one-story, frame, weatherboarded cabins called tents arranged in a double "U"-shape. The focal point of the camp is the arbor; a rough, gable roofed wooden shelter with wooden benches. Also located at the camp is Zion Church; a frame building with a gable roof surmounted by a belfry built about 1930.

It was added to the National Register of Historic Places in 1984.

== See also ==
- Cattle Creek Campground: United Methodist camp meeting ground in Orangeburg County, South Carolina
- Cypress Camp Ground: Methodist camp meeting ground in Dorchester County, South Carolina
- Indian Fields Campground: Methodist camp meeting ground in Dorchester County, South Carolina
- Mount Carmel Campground: AME Zion camp meeting ground in Lancaster County, South Carolina
- St. Paul Camp Ground: AME camp meeting ground in Dorchester County, South Carolina
