= Methodist Tabernacle (Mathews, Virginia) =

Historic church in Virginia, United States

- U.S. National Register of Historic Places
- Virginia Landmarks Register
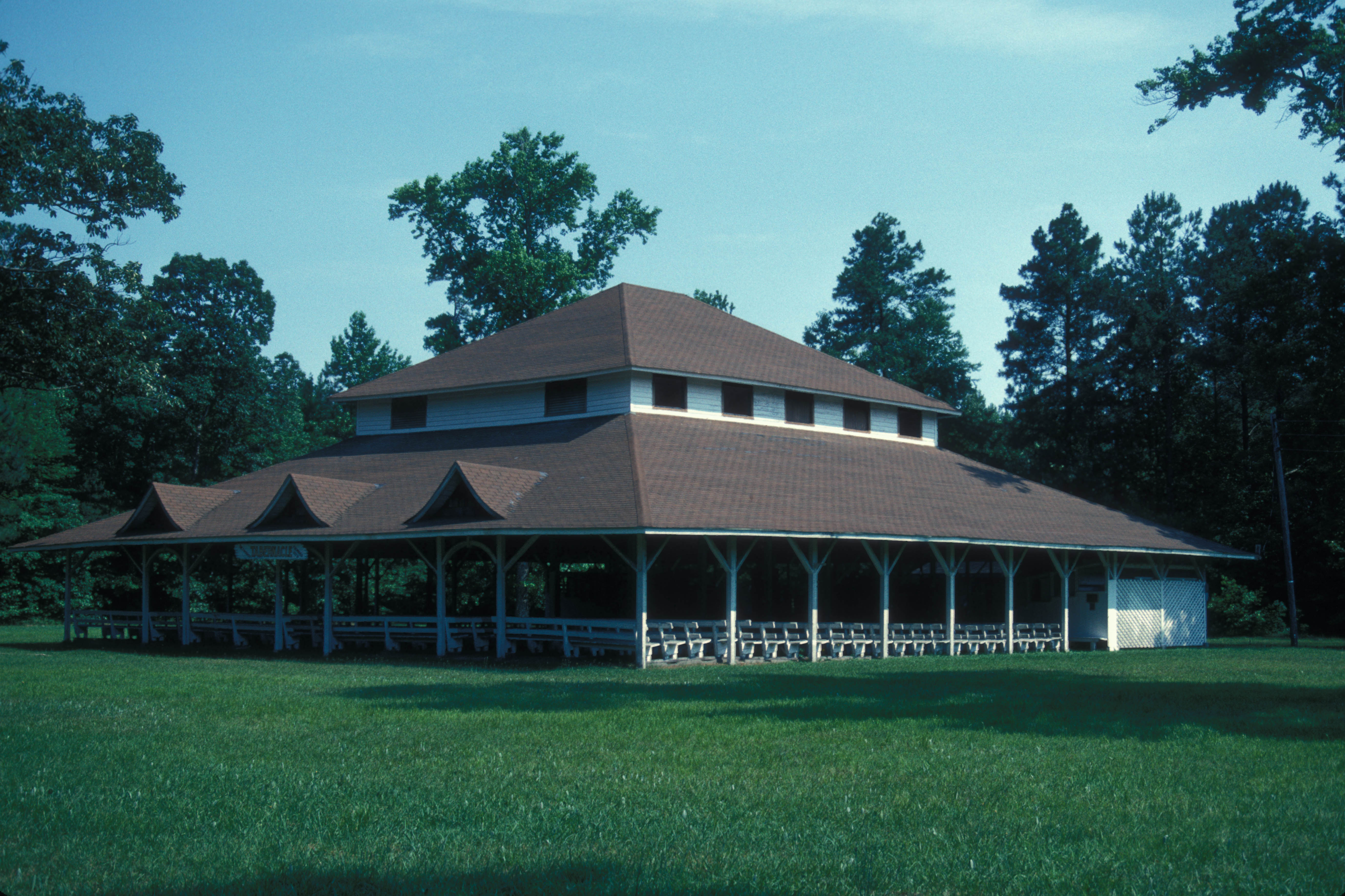
- Methodist Tabernacle, April 1971

- Location within Virginia Location within the United States
- Location: Southeast of Mathews on VA 611 at junction with VA 644, near Mathews, Virginia
- Coordinates: 37°25′19″N 76°17′48″W
- Area: 6 acres (2.4 ha)
- Built: 1922
- NRHP reference No.: 75002024
- VLR No.: 057-0030

Significant dates
- Added to NRHP: May 21, 1975
- Designated VLR: April 15, 1975

Methodist Tabernacle is a historic Methodist tabernacle located near Mathews, Mathews County, Virginia. It was built in 1922, and is a large, open pavilion with a hipped roof surmounted by a hipped clerestory monitor with wooden shutters. The building has 21 rows of wooden benches on the dirt floor arranged along three aisles. The building is a rare example in Virginia of an early 20th century revival meeting facility.

It was listed on the National Register of Historic Places in 1975.
