= Pleasant Grove Camp Meeting Ground =

Historic district in North Carolina, United States

- U.S. National Register of Historic Places
- U.S. Historic district
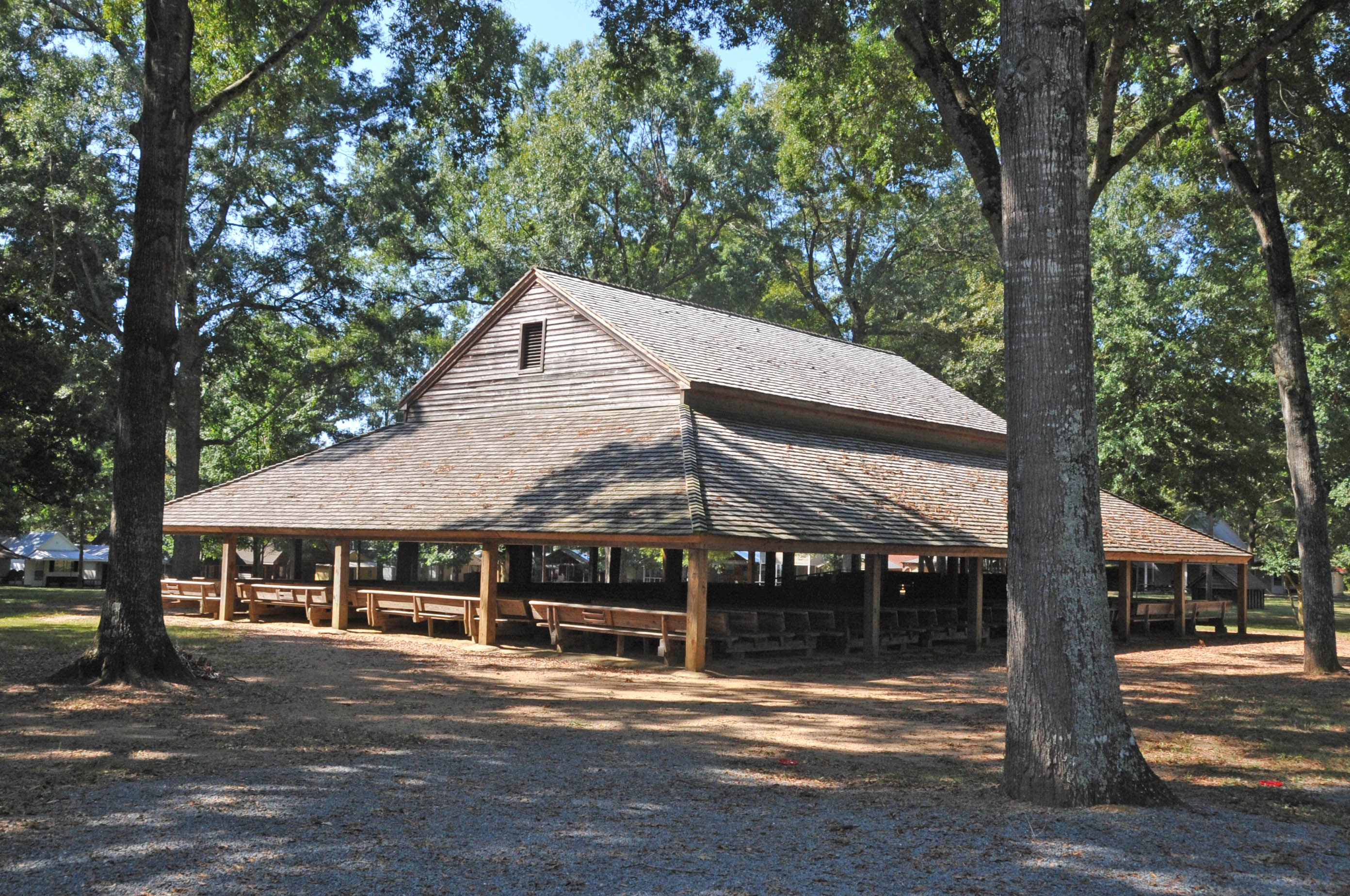
- Pleasant Grove Camp Meeting Ground, March 2007

- Location within North Carolina Location within the United States
- Location: NE of Waxhaw on SR 1327, near Waxhaw, North Carolina
- Coordinates: 34°57′18″N 80°41′8″W
- Area: 9.9 acres (4.0 ha)
- Built: 1830
- NRHP reference No.: 73001370
- Added to NRHP: April 3, 1973

The Pleasant Grove Camp Meeting Ground is a historic Methodist camp meeting national historic district located near Waxhaw, Union County, North Carolina. The district encompasses four contributing buildings and one contributing site. The main building is the arbor that dates to 1830. It is an 80 feet long by 60 feet wide open sided frame structure with a gable roof surround on all four sides by pent roof extensions. Located nearby are the church and former schoolhouse, now used as the preacher's dwelling, and the old cemetery.

It was listed on the National Register of Historic Places in 1973.

== See also ==
- Balls Creek Campground
- Ocean Grove Camp Meeting Association
- Center Arbor
- Chapel Hill Church Tabernacle
