= Balls Creek Campground =

Historic district in North Carolina, United States

- U.S. National Register of Historic Places
- U.S. Historic district
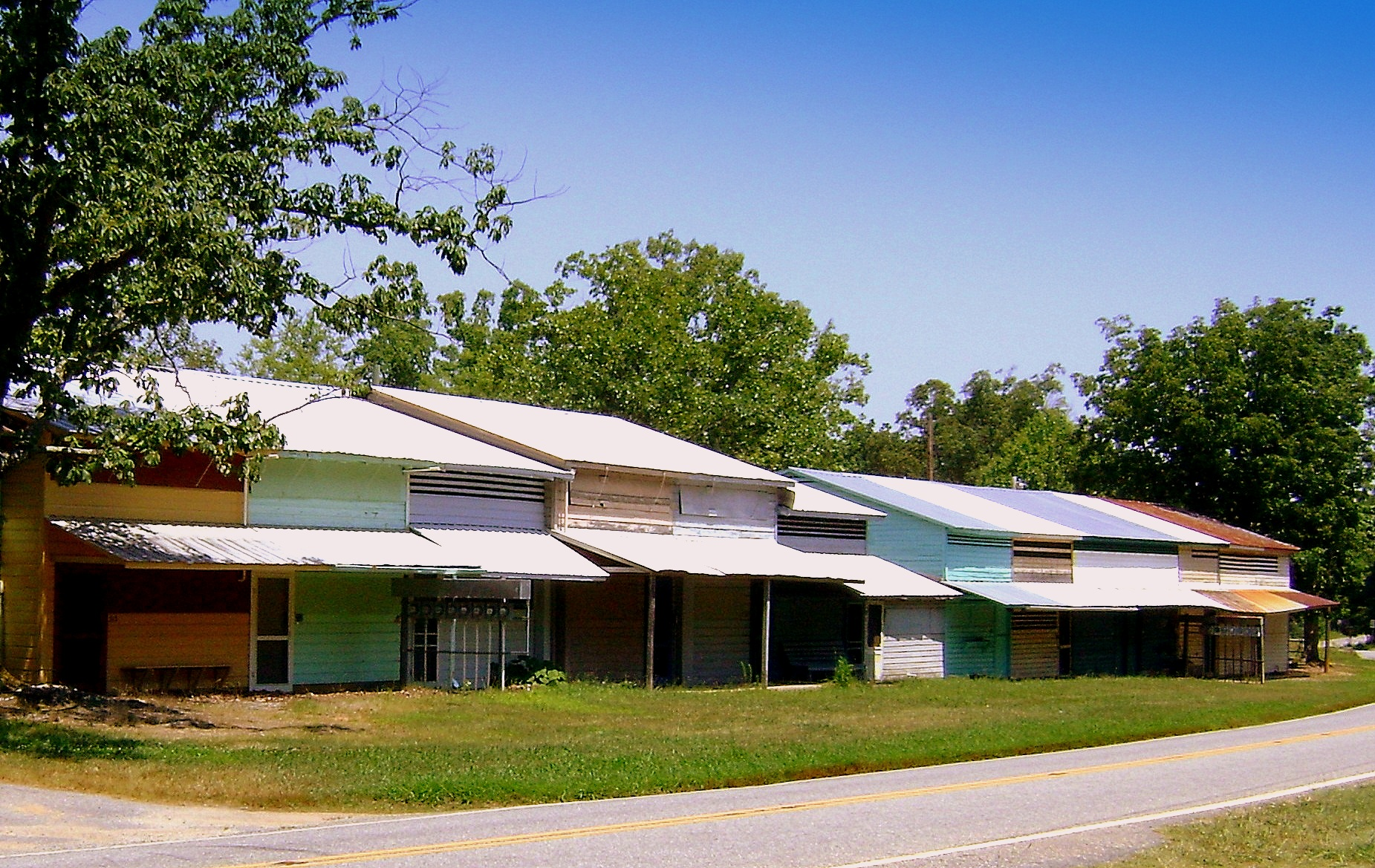
- Balls Creek Campground, July 2010

- Location within North Carolina Location within the United States
- Location: West side of SR 1003, 0.1 miles (0.16 km) south of SR 1943, near Bandy's Crossroads, North Carolina
- Coordinates: 35°37′46″N 81°05′50″W
- Area: 31.1 acres (12.6 ha)
- MPS: Catawba County MPS
- NRHP reference No.: 90000662
- Added to NRHP: April 27, 1990

Balls Creek Campground is a historic Methodist camp meeting and national historic district located near Bandy's Crossroads, Catawba County, North Carolina.

The district encompasses 310 contributing buildings and 1 contributing site. They include the Arbor (c. 1930), "tents" (individual family dwellings) dating back to the 1850s, a store called "The Shack" (c. 1940), and jail dated to the late-19th / early-20th century.

== History ==
The site was established in 1853 and is an offshoot of Rock Springs Campmeeting in Denver, NC after Lincoln was split into Catawba and Lincoln counties which is believed to be one of the largest religious campgrounds in the southern United States.

A camp meeting continues to be held there every August, with "tents" selling for as much as $65,000 each. The site was added to the National Register of Historic Places in 1990.

On September 29, 2019, a "suspicious" fire destroyed or damaged 40 of the site's 302 cabins and elicited the response of more than 14 fire departments and over 100 firefighters from Catawba and surrounding counties.

== See also ==
- Pleasant Grove Camp Meeting Ground
- Ocean Grove Camp Meeting Association
- Chapel Hill Church Tabernacle
