= Tabernacle (Methodist) =

Center of a camp meeting In Methodism

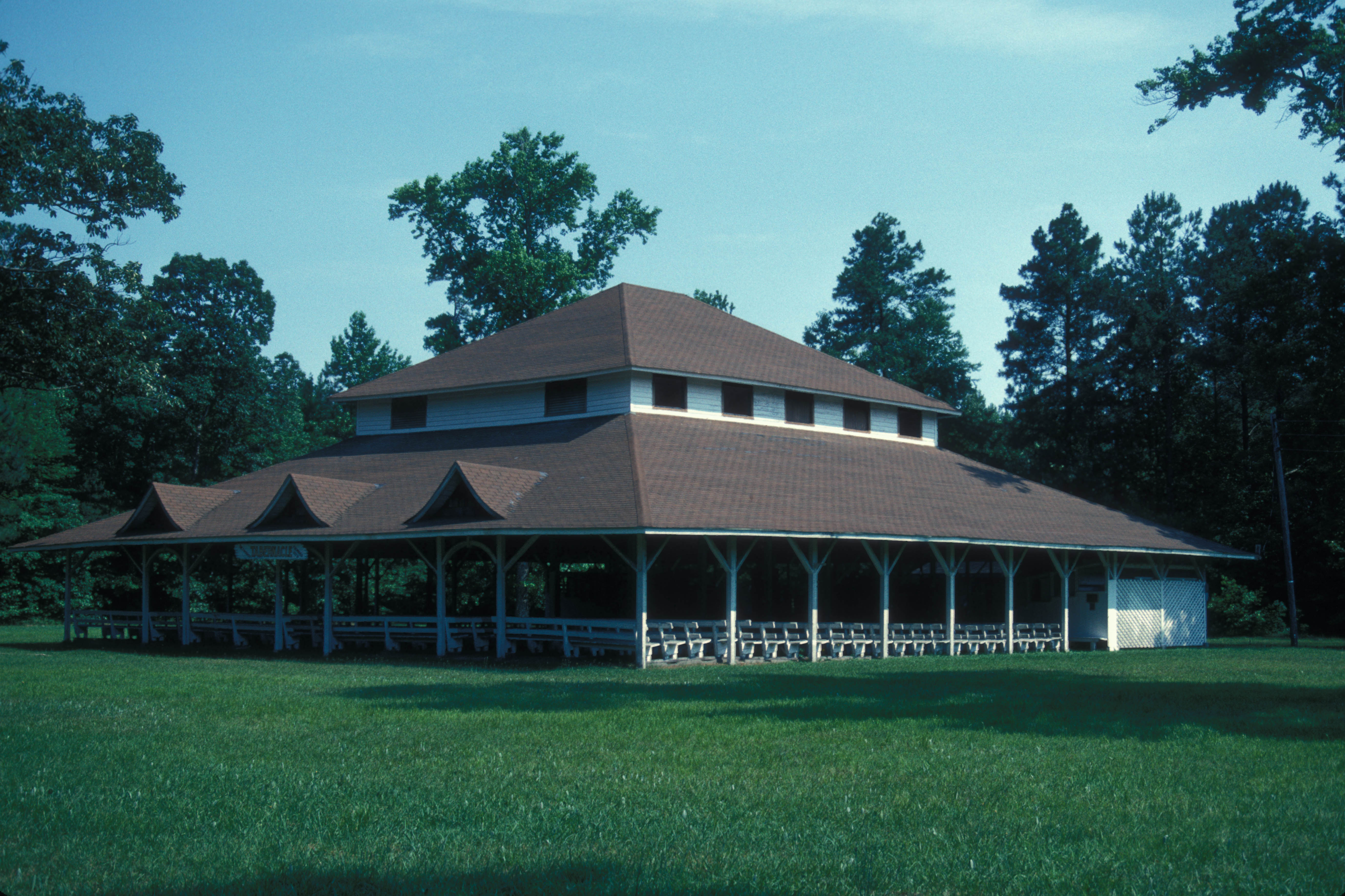
Methodist Tabernacle in Mathews, Virginia

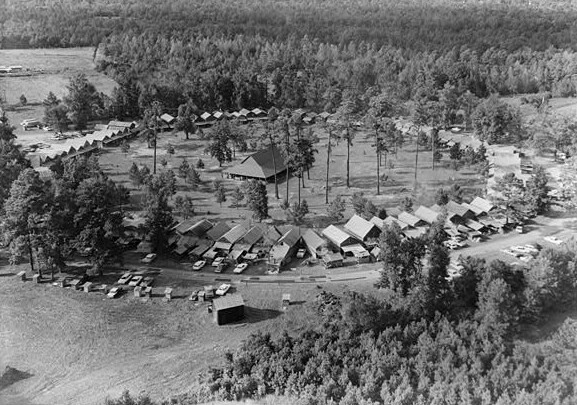
The tabernacle lies in the center of Indian Fields Methodist Campground.

In Methodism (inclusive of the holiness movement), a tabernacle is the center of a camp meeting, where revival services occur. These evangelistic services are aimed at preaching the two works of grace in Methodism: (1) the New Birth and (2) entire sanctification. They additionally call backsliders to repentance. Tabernacles may be constructed in a cruciform-shaped fashion and are most often made of wood. Like the interior of many Methodist churches, in the center of the tabernacle is an altar upon which the Eucharist is consecrated; a pulpit stands near it and is used by preachers to deliver sermons. The area of the tabernacle housing the altar and pulpit is delimited by the mourner's bench, which is used by congregants during altar calls. Surrounding the tabernacle itself are usually several cabins and/or tents, where people stay while attending the camp meeting.

== Gallery ==
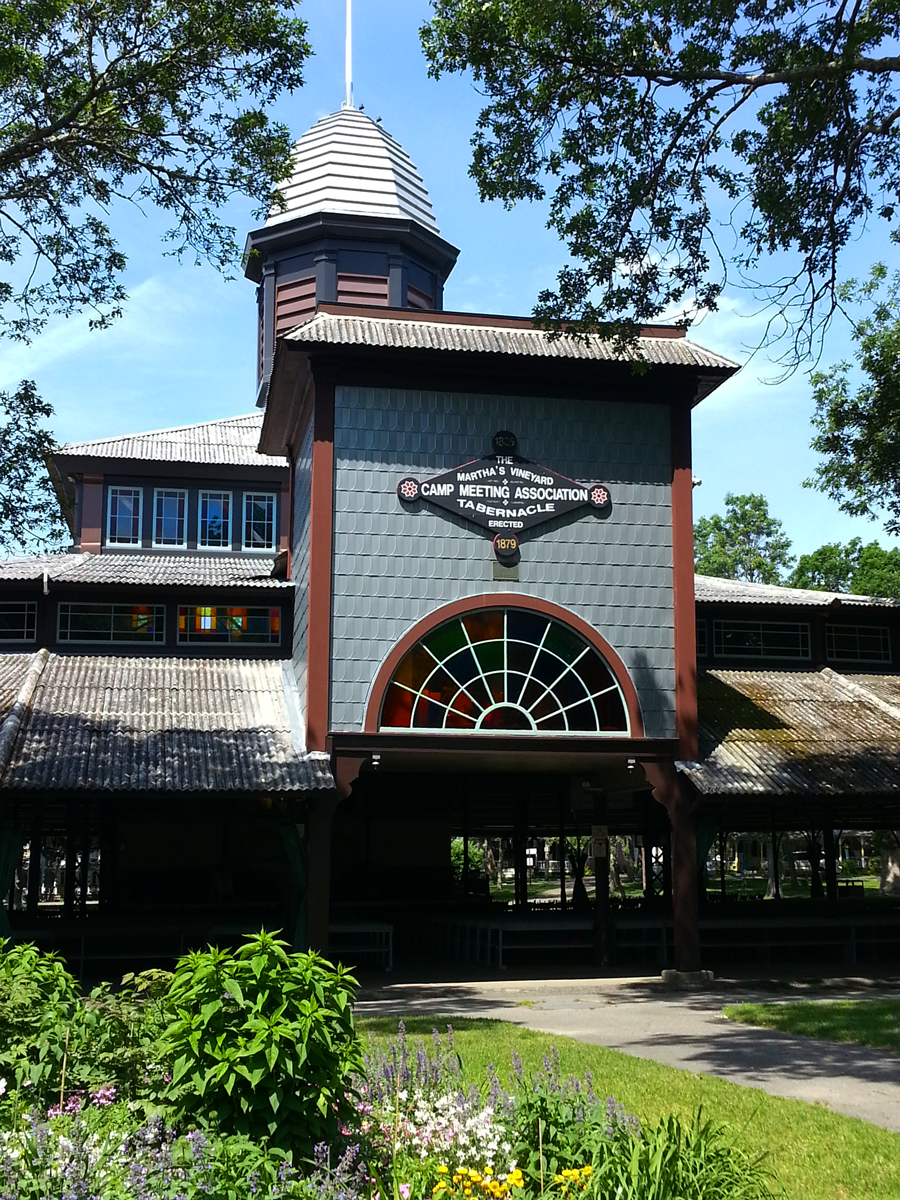
The tabernacle of Wesleyan Grove, also known as the Martha's Vineyard Campmeeting Association

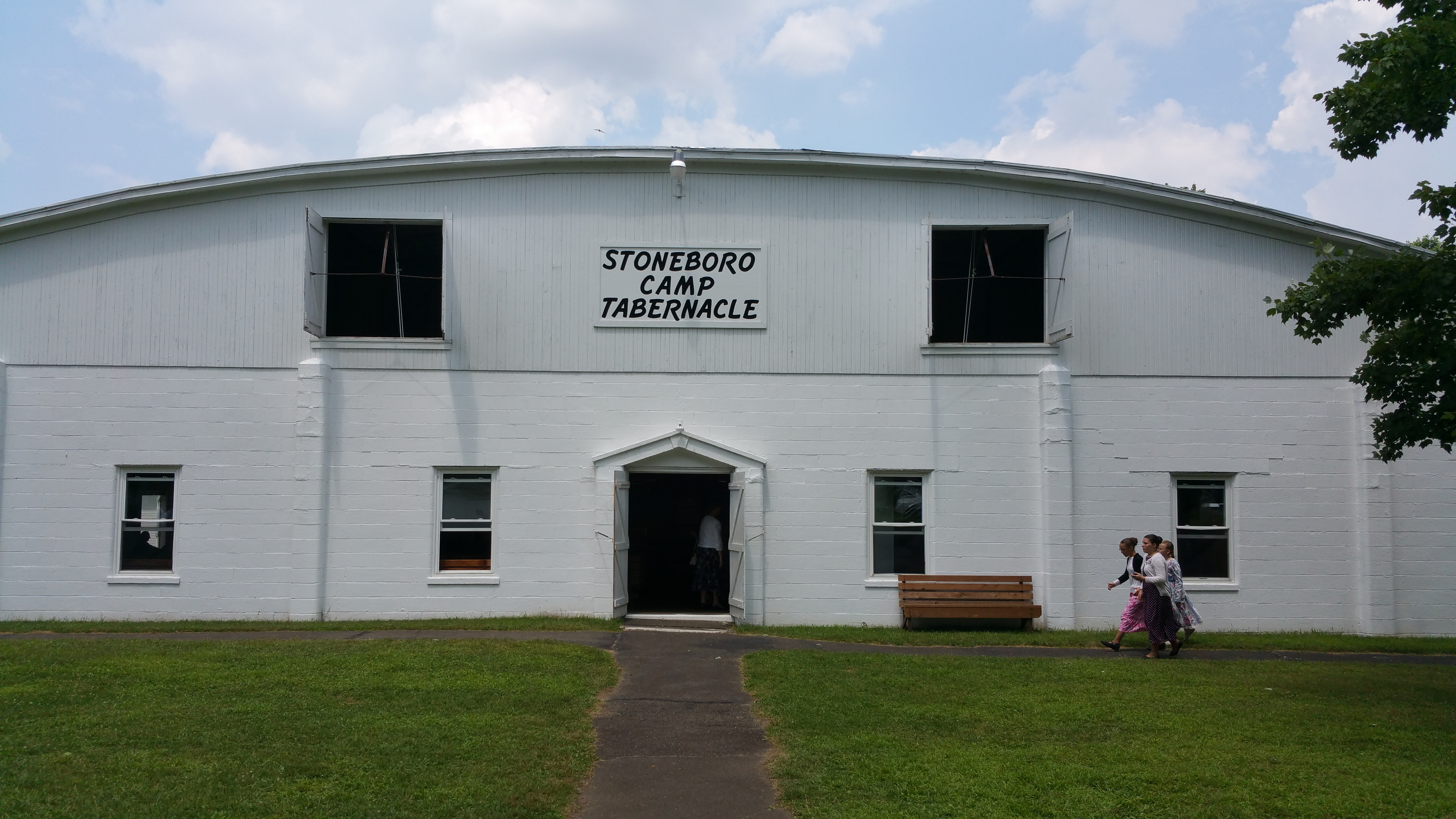
The tabernacle of Methodist Campground in Stoneboro, Pennsylvania

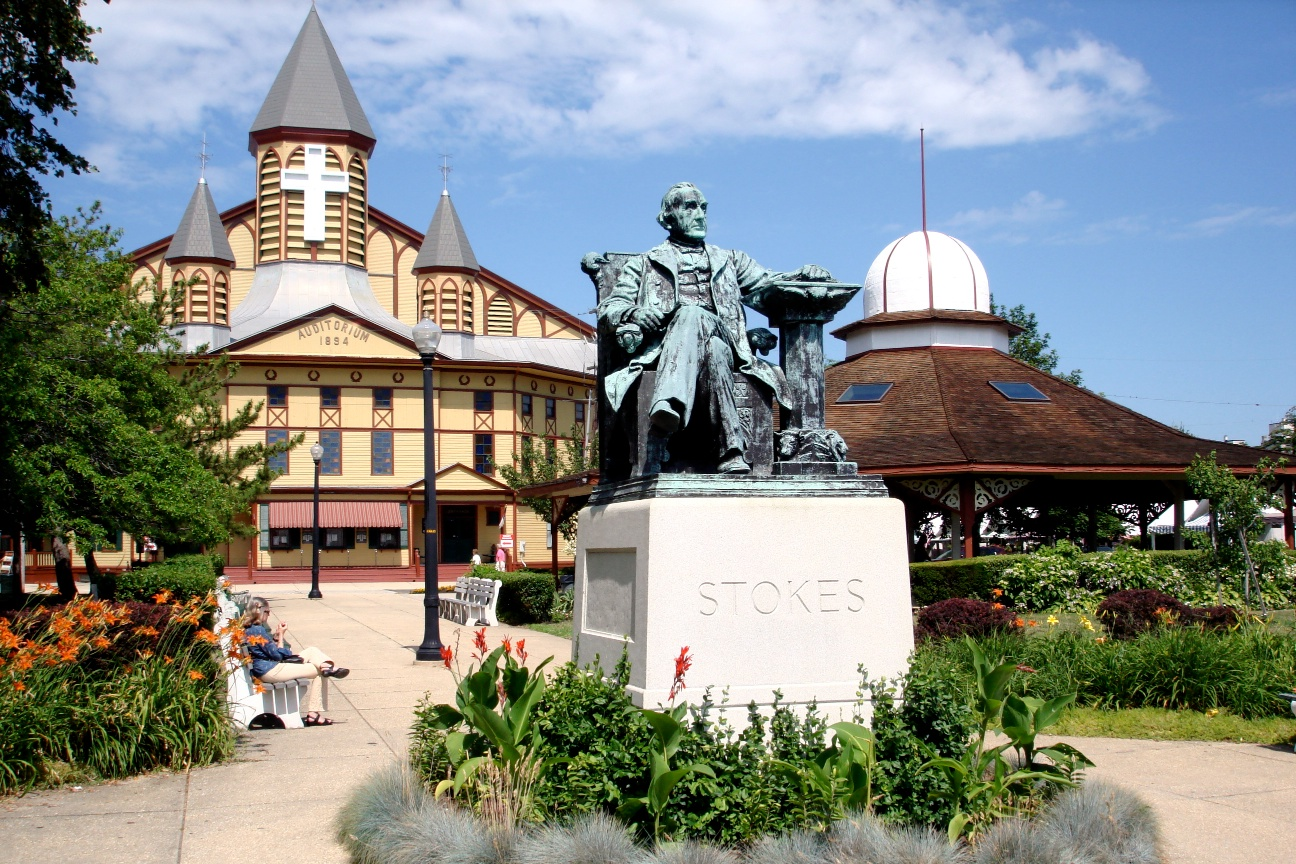
The tabernacle of Ocean Grove, New Jersey

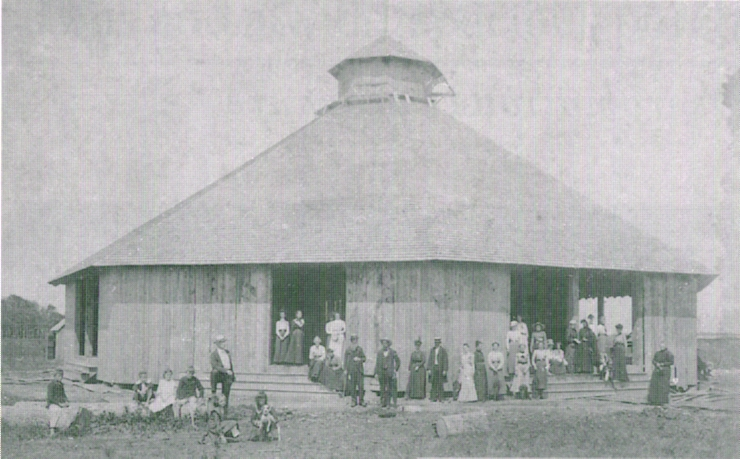
The tabernacle of Bethany Beach, Delaware

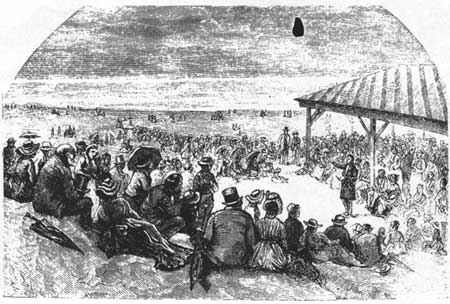
Methodists gather at the tabernacle of Ocean Grove, New Jersey

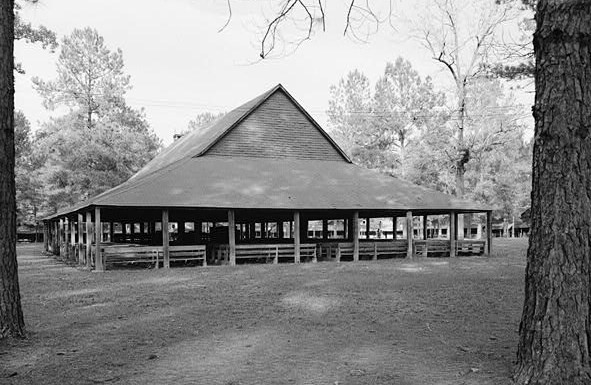
The tabernacle of Indian Fields Methodist Campground

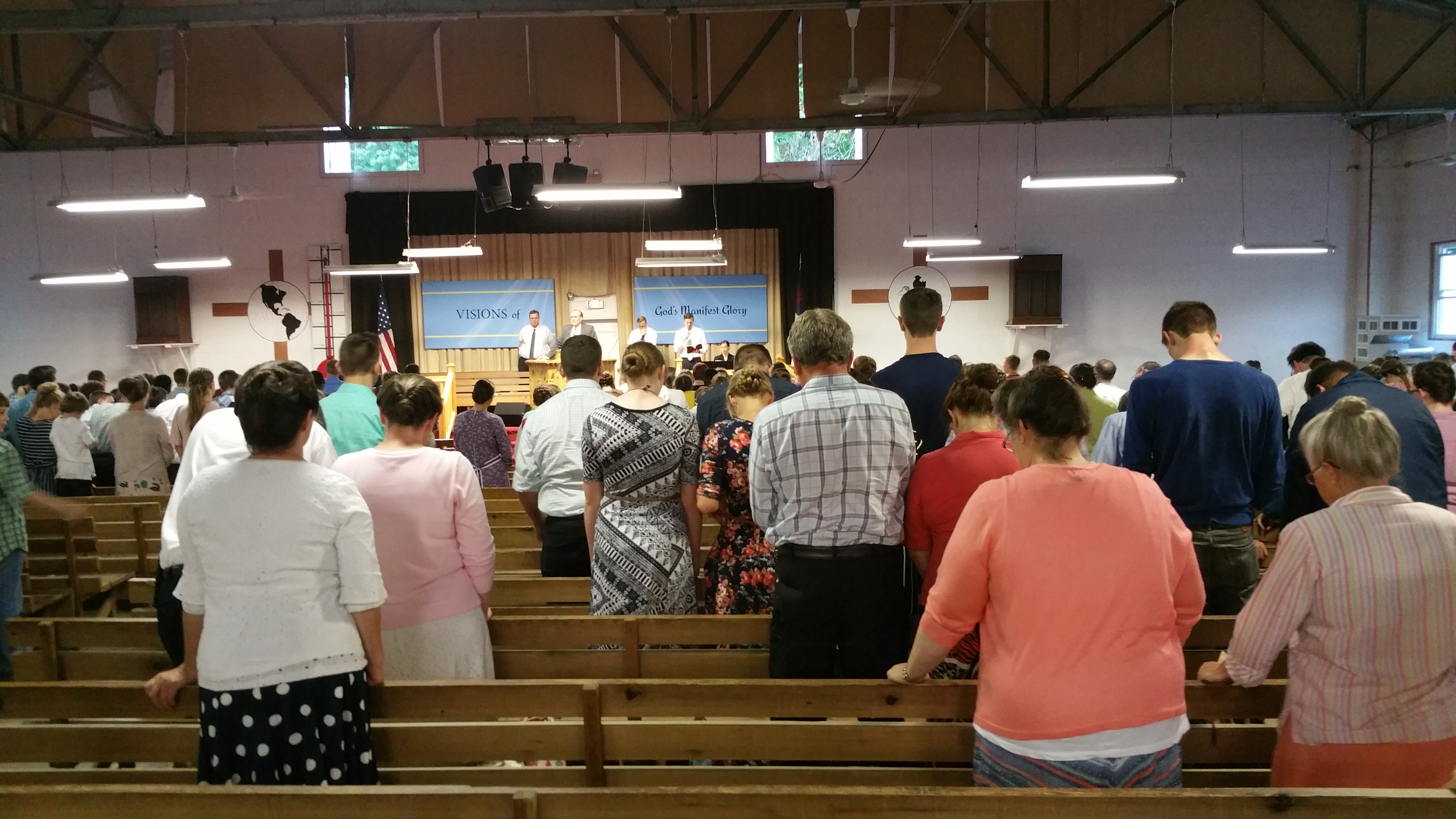
A camp meeting service at Wesleyan Methodist Campground in Stoneboro, Pennsylvania

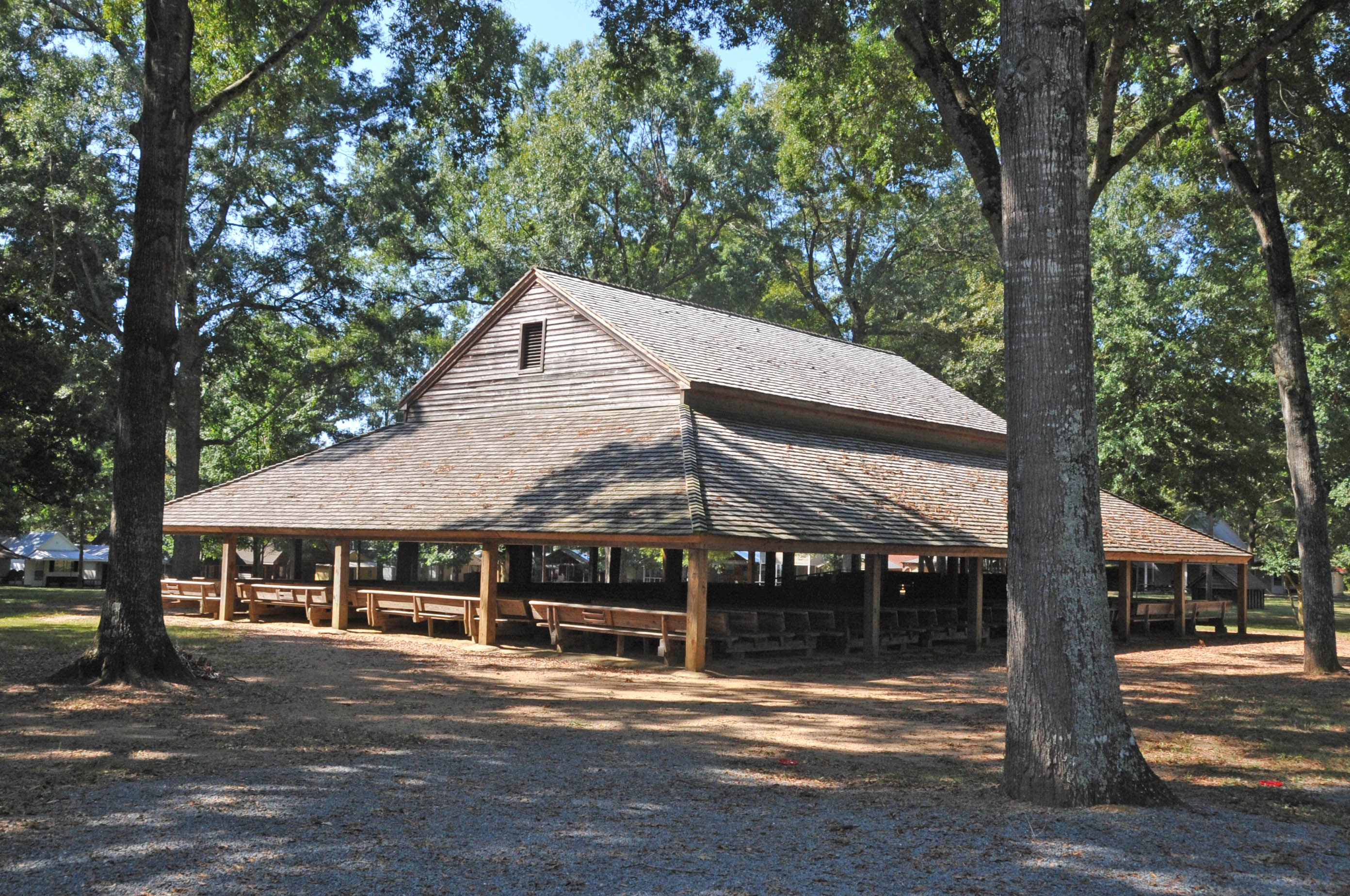
The tabernacle of Pleasant Grove Camp Meeting Ground

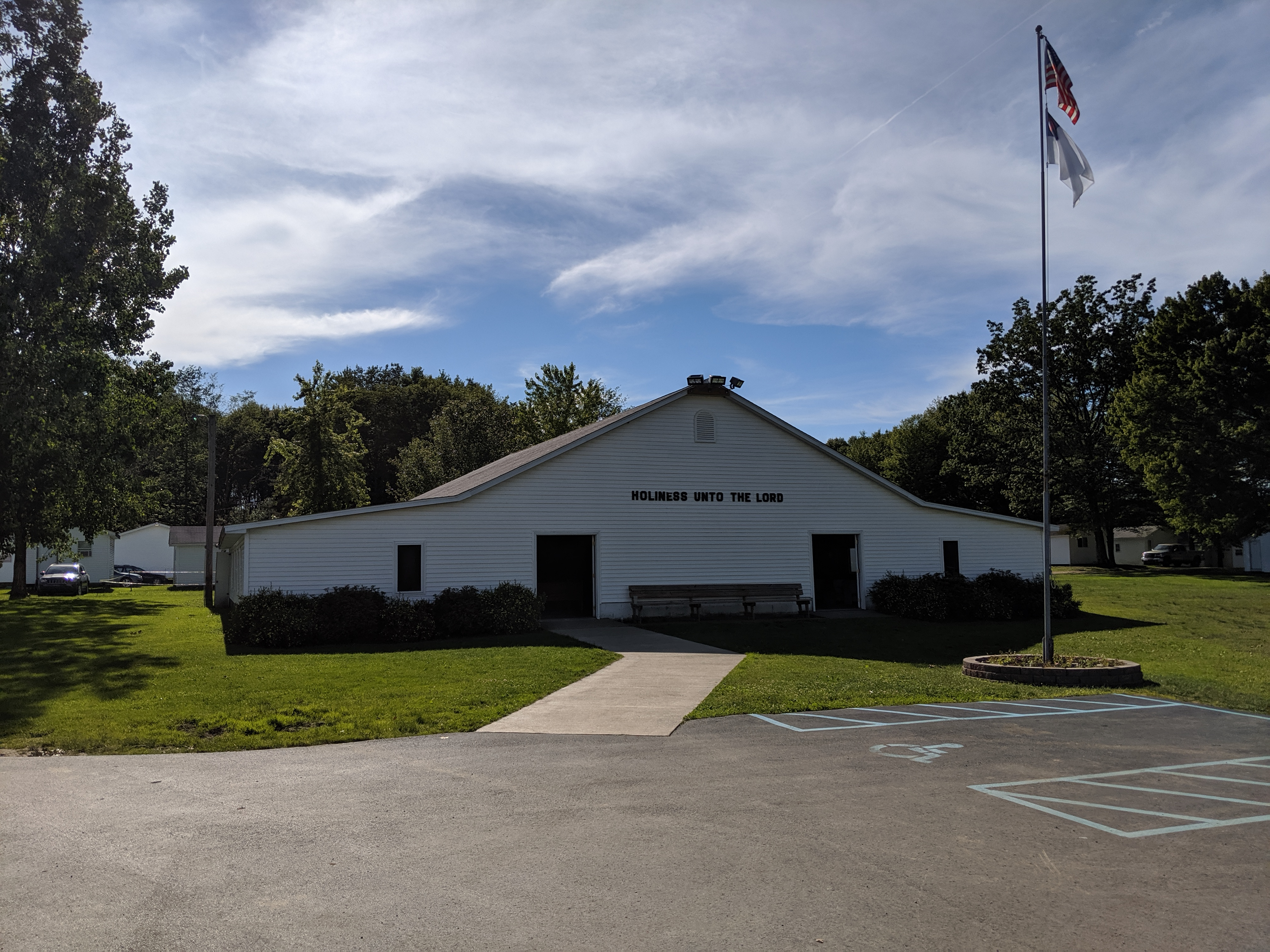
The tabernacle of Summit Evangelical Wesleyan Campground in Cooperstown, Pennsylvania

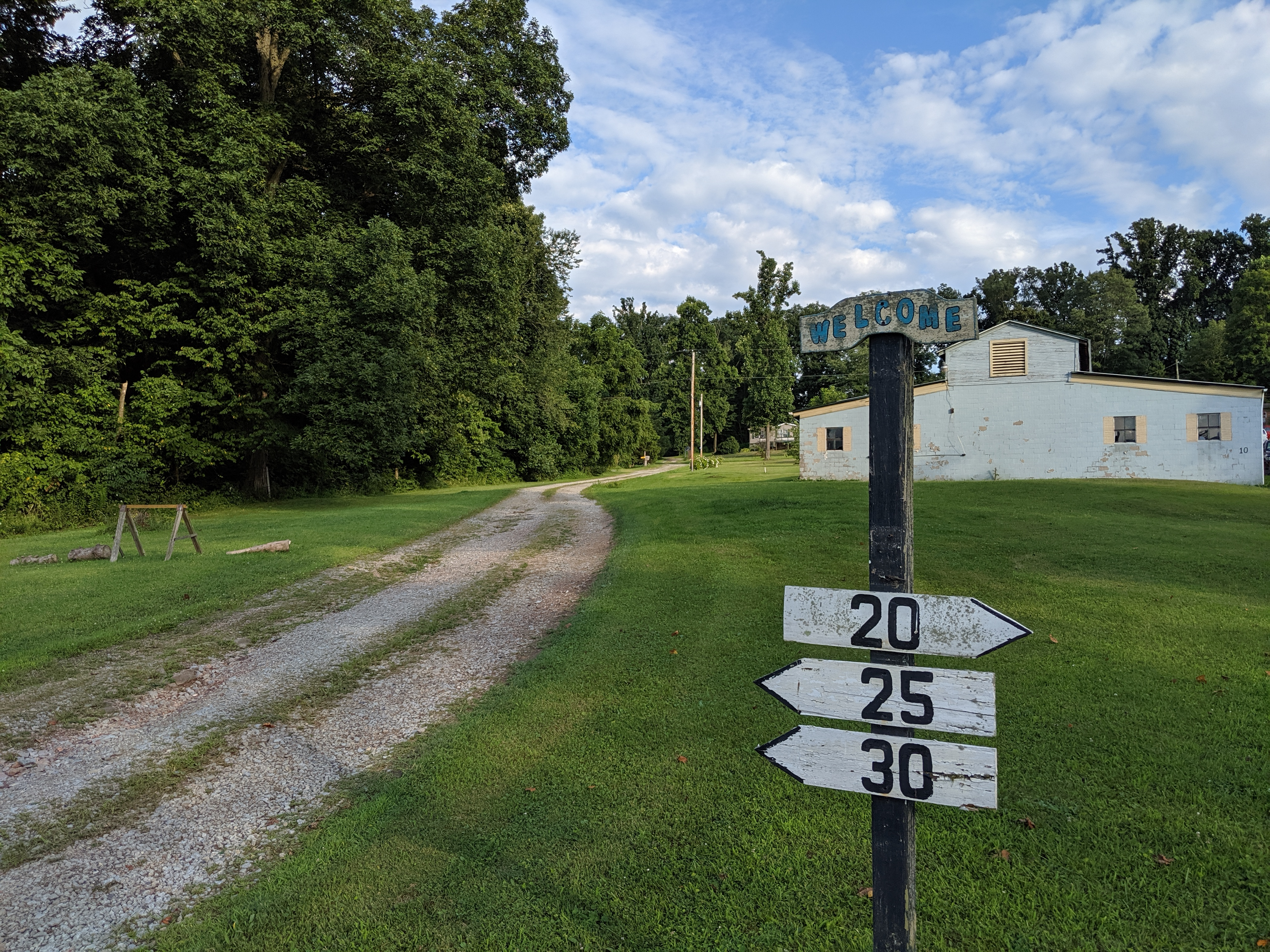
The tabernacle of Flatwoods Reformed Free Methodist Campground in Vanderbilt, Pennsylvania

The tabernacle of the R.G. Finch Memorial Holiness Methodist Campground in Tollesboro, Kentucky

The interior of the tabernacle of Oakland Mills Methodist Campground in Oakland Mills, Pennsylvania

The tabernacle of Oakland Mills Methodist Campground in Oakland Mills, Pennsylvania, which belongs to the EMCC

== See also ==
- Lovefeast
- Tent revival
- Second work of grace
