= Camp meeting =

Christian gathering which originated in 19th-century America

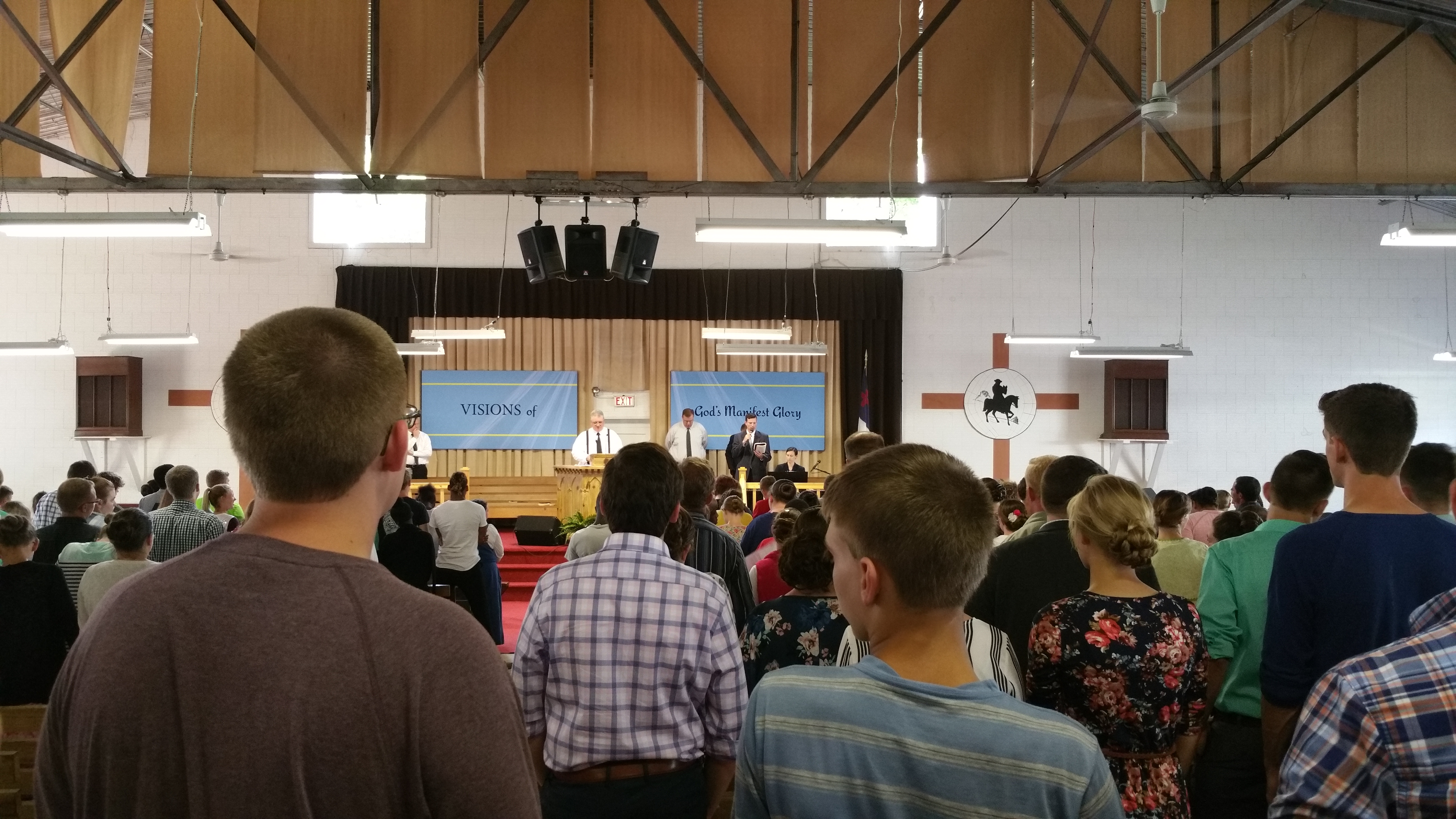
A service of worship during a camp meeting at the tabernacle of Methodist Campground in Stoneboro, Pennsylvania, owned by the Allegheny Wesleyan Methodist Connection

The camp meeting is a form of Protestant Christian religious service originating in England and Scotland as an evangelical event in association with the communion season. It was held for worship, preaching and communion on the American frontier during the Second Great Awakening of the early 19th century. Revivals and camp meetings continued to be held by various denominations, and led to the development of seasonal cottages or cabins for those who attend on an annual basis.

Originally camp meetings were held in frontier areas, where people without regular preachers would travel on occasion from a large region to a particular site to camp, pray, sing hymns, and listen to itinerant preachers at the tabernacle of the campground. Camp meetings offer community, often singing and other music, and diversion from work. The practice was a major component of the Second Great Awakening, an evangelical movement promoted by Baptist, Methodist, Presbyterian and other preachers in the early 19th century. Certain denominations took the lead in different geographic areas.

As with brush arbor revivals and tent revivals, camp meetings today are often held annually at campgrounds owned by a Christian denomination.

== Background ==
The camp meeting is a phenomenon of British Christianity and American frontier Christianity. It has strong roots in traditional practices of the Presbyterian Church in Scotland. Scots and Scots-Irish immigrants brought their familiar Presbyterian communion season practices with them to the US. Barton W. Stone and Alexander Campbell, two leading ministers of the later Restoration Movement of the 1830s, had each been ordained as Presbyterian ministers and served for several years in that role, leading preaching at numerous meetings.

Additionally, the early Methodists practiced "clustering worship services together over several days", which developed into "full-blown camp meetings after the start of the nineteenth century."

The movement of thousands of settlers to new territories without permanent villages of the types they knew meant they were without religious communities. Not only were there few authorized houses of worship, there were fewer ordained ministers to fill the pulpits. The "camp meeting" led by itinerant preachers was an innovative response to this situation. Word of mouth told there was to be a religious meeting at a certain location. Due to the primitive means of transportation, if the meeting was to be more than a few miles' distance from the homes of those attending, they would need to stay at the revival for its entire duration, or as long as they desired to remain. People generally camped out at or near the revival site, as on the frontier there were usually neither adequate accommodations nor the funds for frontier families to use them. People were attracted to large camp meetings from a wide area. Some came out of sincere religious devotion or interest, others out of curiosity and a desire for a break from the arduous frontier routine; the structure of the situation often resulted in new converts.

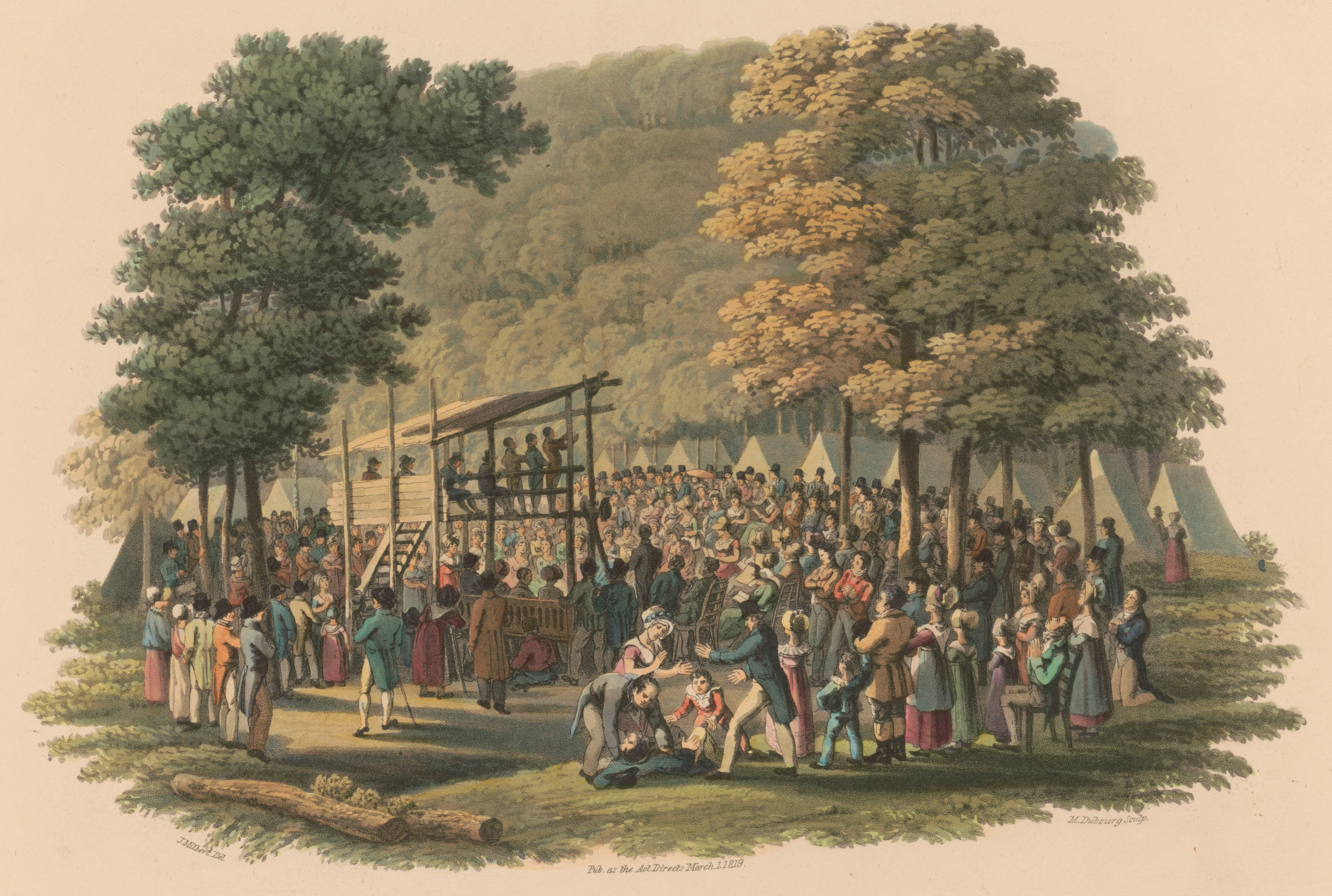
An engraving of a Methodist camp meeting in 1819 (US Library of Congress).

Freed from daily routines for the duration of the meeting, participants could take part in almost continuous services, which resulted in high emotions; once one speaker was finished (often after several hours), another would often rise to take his place.

Several ministers, sometimes from different denominations, provided virtually nonstop preaching and hymn singing during the day, in the evening, and late into the night. Attenders anticipated and had emotional conversion experiences, with crying, trances, and exaltation.

Lee Sandlin gave an overview of the typical camp meeting in frontier America:

A typical meeting began in a low-key, almost solemn way. A preacher gave a sermon of welcome and led a prayer for peace and community. This was followed by the singing of several hymns. Then there would be more sermons. …

The next day, and the day following, the sermons grew increasingly sensational and impassioned, and the excited response of the crowd grew more prolonged. By the second or third day, people were crying out during the sermons, and shouting prayers, and bursting into loud lamentations; they began grabbing at their neighbors and desperately pleading with them to repent; they sobbed uncontrollably and ran in terror through the crowd, shoving aside everybody in their path. …

As the preachers ranted without letup, the crowd was driven into a kind of collective ecstasy. In the night, as the torches and bonfires flared around the meeting ground and the darkness of the trackless forests closed in, people behaved as if possessed by something new and unfathomable. As Finley wrote: "A strange supernatural power seemed to pervade the entire mass of mind there collected."

Sandlin's commentary is a provocative opinion piece compared to the less sensationalist descriptions by those better qualified to write about the event, such as Colonel Robert Patterson, who had been involved in the settlement of Kentucky practically from the beginning. He had described with amazement the religious phenomena taking place during the sequence of meetings. His description of the Cane Ridge Revival, taken from a letter to the Rev. Doctor John King on September 25, 1801, is memorable:

On the first Sabbath of August, was the Sacrament of Kainridge, the congregation of Mr. Stone. – This was the largest meeting of any that I have ever seen: It continued from Friday till Wednesday. About 12,000 persons, 125 waggons, 8 carriages, 900 communicants, 300 were struck.

Patterson tried, "as well as I am able", to describe the emotion.

Of all ages, from 8 years and upwards; male and female; rich and poor; the blacks; and of every denomination; those in favour of it, as well as those, at the instant in opposition to it, and railing against it, have instantaneously laid motionless on the ground. Some feel the approaching symptoms by being under deep convictions; their heart swells, their nerves relax, and in an instant they become motionless and speechless, but generally retain their senses.

Patterson went on to describe other manifestations which lasted from "one hour to 24", and continued:

In order to give you a more just conception of it, suppose so large a congregation assembled in the woods, ministers preaching day and night; the camp illuminated with candles, on trees, at wagons, and at the tent; persons falling down, and carried out of the crowd, by those next to them, and taken to some convenient place, where prayer is made for them, some Psalm or Hymn, suitable to the occasion, sung. If they speak, what they say is attended to, being very solemn and affecting – many are struck under such exhortations… Now suppose 20 of those groups around; some rejoicing, and great solemnity on every countenance, and you will form some imperfect idea of the extraordinary work! Indeed it is a miracle, that a wicked unthoughtful sinner, who never could, or did address himself, to an audience before, should, rise out of one of those fits and continue for the space of two hours recommending religion and Jesus Christ to sinners, as a lovely Savior, free willing, and all sufficient, and calling to sinners and inviting them to come to Christ and close in with the offer of salvation, in the most pressing an engaging manner.

Revivalism had been a significant force in religion since the 1740s and the First Great Awakening, but in the days of the camp meeting, "revivalism became the dominant religious culture." These sorts of meetings contributed greatly to what became known as the Second Great Awakening. A particularly large and successful revival was held at Cane Ridge, Kentucky in 1801, led by some ministers later active in what became the Restoration Movement. Some scholars suggest that this was the pioneering event in the history of frontier camp meetings in America. What made camp meetings successful and multiply quite rapidly "were their emphases upon revivalism and morality, de-emphasis upon formal theology, clergy sharing the worldview of the frontier dwellers, and respect for common people.

Frost summarizes: "Camp-meeting religion reinforced older themes of revivalism, including a sense of cooperation among the denominations, all of which confronted individual sinners with the necessity of making a decision to be converted."

In the early 1800s in what is now Toronto, Ohio, members of the Sugar Grove Methodist Episcopal Church with the assistance of circuit preachers began a series of camp meetings in the surrounding area. One such meeting, first being held out of the home of a local family, has met annually in Hollow Rock Run since it was formally organized as a Methodist camp in 1818 while continuing to use the family's farm land. In 1875 at the urging of prominent clergy and members, the camp meeting became interdenominational through the formation of the Hollow Rock Holiness Camp Meeting Association and its leasing and eventual purchase of the land. The association, which still operates the camp, notes that it is the oldest Christian camp meeting in continual existence in the United States, being supported by various denominations in the Wesleyan-Holiness tradition.

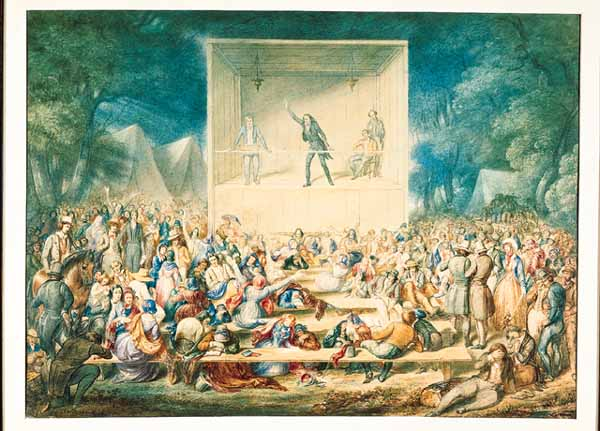
A watercolor painting of a camp meeting circa 1839 (New Bedford Whaling Museum).

Another camp gathering area, known now as the Campgrounds, was located in present-day Merrick, New York. Parishioners arrived by wagon, parking them in two concentric circles. Eventually some started building small seasonal cottages, which offered more comfort than the wagons for repeated use. A chapel and a house for the minister were also built. In the 1920s, with new areas open to those with cars, people stopped using the campground. The cottages and church buildings were adapted as local, permanent residences, and most survive today. The two roads, Wesley and Fletcher avenues, encompass the area of the original paths which the wagons would encircle. The area is also known as Tiny Town because of the small size of the original cottages.

In the aftermath of the American Civil War, such evangelical camp meetings gained wide recognition and a substantial increase in popularity as a result of a holiness movement camp meeting in Vineland, New Jersey in 1867. In the mid-Atlantic states, the Methodist Church led many of these camp meetings and established semi-permanent sites for summer seasons. Ocean Grove, New Jersey, founded in 1869, has been called the "Queen of the Victorian Methodist Camp Meetings." Similar areas include Cape May Point, New Jersey, with others in Maryland and New York. At the end of the nineteenth century, believers in Spiritualism also established camp meetings throughout the United States.

Camp meetings in the United States continued to be conducted on a wide scale for many years. Some are still held in the 21st century, primarily by Methodist (including churches affiliated with the holiness movement) and Pentecostal groups, as well as other Protestants, such as Baptists and Presbyterians. Some scholars consider the revival meeting a form that arose to recreate the spirit of the frontier camp meeting.

The Balls Creek Campground camp meeting was established in 1853 and is believed to be one of the largest religious campgrounds in the southern United States. Other sites of Methodist camp meetings in North Carolina are the Chapel Hill Church Tabernacle, Center Arbor, and Pleasant Grove Camp Meeting Ground (1830).

== Music and hymn singing ==
The camp meeting tradition fostered a tradition of music and hymn singing with strong oral, improvisatory, and spontaneous elements.

Hymns were taught and learned by rote, and a spontaneous and improvisatory element was prized. Both tunes and words were created, changed, and adapted in true folk music fashion:

Specialists in nineteenth-century American religious history describe camp meeting music as the creative product of participants who, when seized by the spirit of a particular sermon or prayer, would take lines from a preacher's text as a point of departure for a short, simple melody. The melody was either borrowed from a preexisting tune or made up on the spot. The line would be sung repeatedly, changing slightly each time, and shaped gradually into a stanza that could be learned easily by others and memorized quickly.

Spontaneous song became a marked characteristic of the camp meetings. Rough and irregular couplets or stanzas were concocted out of Scripture phrases and every-day speech, with liberal interspersing of Hallelujahs and refrains. Such ejaculatory hymns were frequently started by an excited auditor during the preaching, and taken up by the throng, until the meeting dissolved into a "singing-ecstasy" culminating in general hand-shaking. Sometimes they were given forth by a preacher, who had a sense of rhythm, under the excitement of his preaching and the agitation of his audience. Hymns were also composed more deliberately out of meeting, and taught to the people or lined out from the pulpit.

Collections of camp meeting hymns were published, which served both to propagate tunes and texts that were commonly used, and to document the most commonly sung tunes and texts. Example hymnals include The Pilgrams' songster; or, A choice collection of spiritual songs (1828), The Camp-meeting Chorister (1830) and The Golden Harp (1857)

Many of these songs were republished in shape note songbooks such as A Supplement to the Kentucky Harmony (1820), the Sacred Harp (1844), and dozens of other publications; they can typically be distinguished by the reuse and re-arrangement of certain lines of lyrics from other songs, re-set to a new melody and sometimes containing new lyrics. Many of these camp songs are also set in a "call and response" format, typically, every line of lyric is followed by the words "Glory Hallelujah!" (although this varies, and other phrases or combinations can be used as well), which allows for easy audience participation in their original format, as the audience can call back the response even if they do not know the lyrics of the song itself. For example, the tune "Antioch 277" from the Sacred Harp reads:

I know that my Redeemer lives, Glory, Hallelujah!
What comfort this sweet sentence gives, Glory Hallelujah!
Shout on, pray on, we're gaining ground, Glory Hallelujah!
The dead's alive and the lost is found, Glory Hallelujah!
(F.C. Wood, 1850)

The 20th-century American composer Charles Ives used the camp meeting phenomenon as a metaphysical basis for his Symphony No. 3 (Ives). He incorporated hymn tunes and American Civil War-era popular songs (which are closely related to camp meeting songs) as part of the symphony's musical material. The piece was not premiered until 1946, almost 40 years after its composition, and the symphony was awarded the Pulitzer Prize in 1947.

== Practice by Christian denomination ==
=== Anabaptism ===
The Dunkard Brethren Church, a denomination of Conservative Anabaptist Christianity, holds its annual camp meeting at Roxbury Holiness Camp.

=== Methodism ===
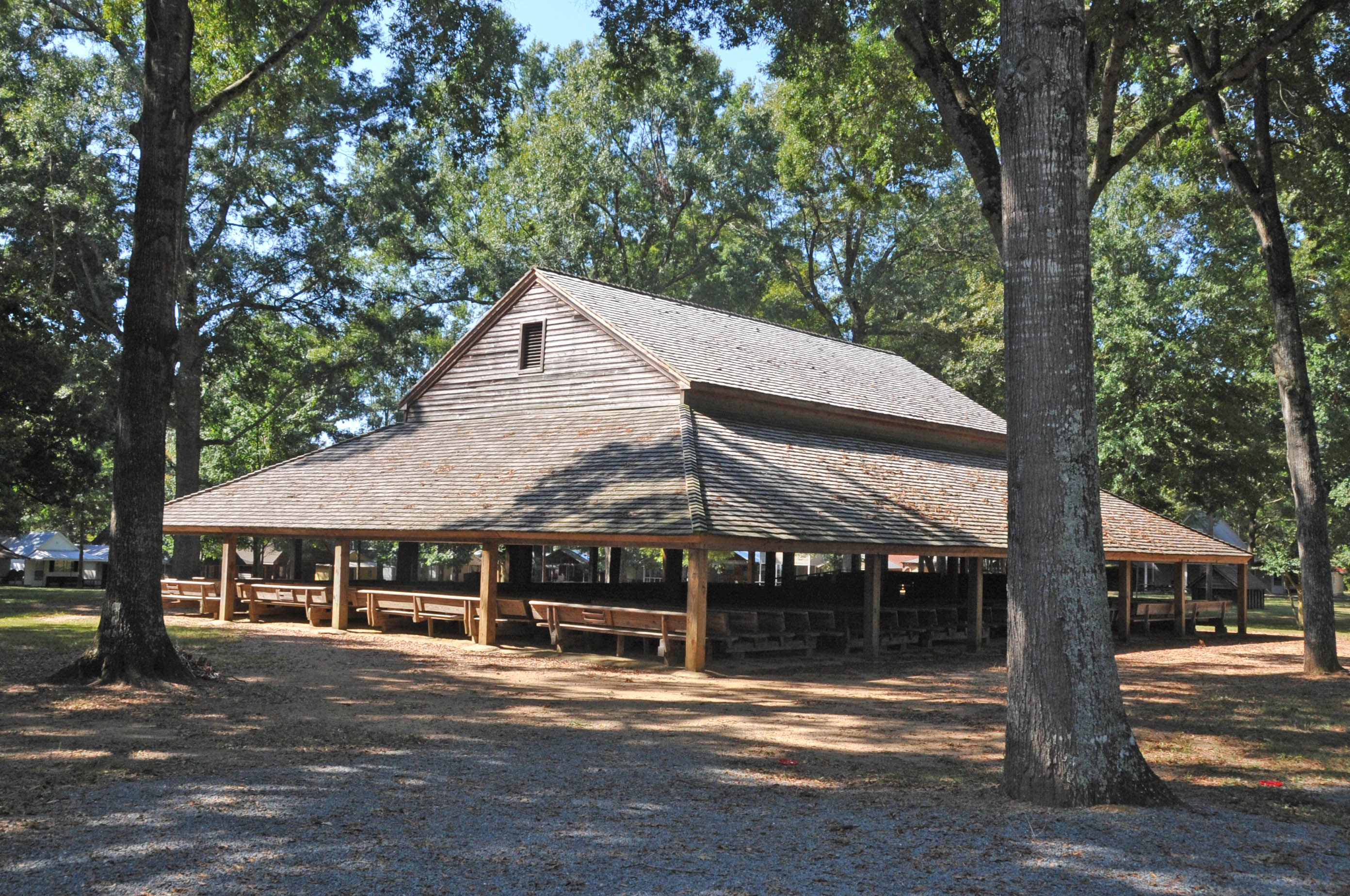
The tabernacle of Pleasant Grove Camp Meeting Ground, owned by the Pleasant Grove Methodist Church in Union County, North Carolina.

Francis Asbury, the first bishop of the American Methodist Episcopal Church, was a staunch supporter of camp meetings. At Methodist camp meetings, which continue to occur today:

... both the Eucharist and Love Feast were celebrated. But the focus of the camp meeting was on preaching of the "way of salvation," and the physical layout of the camp meeting assembly area came to be a sacred space representing the stages on the way of salvation. The altar rail, originated the point for receiving Holy Communion, came to represent the surrender of oneself in conversion and entire sanctification. The "mourner's bench" (or "anxious bench," as it was decried by the theologians of the Mercersburg movement) was placed in front of the altar rail and represented the experience of spiritual "awakening" that typically preceded conversion in understanding of the "way of salvation." In a weekend format, one might expect a sermon on sin, awakening and repentance on Friday, sermons on conversion and assurance on Saturday, and preaching on sanctification (including entire sanctification) on Sunday.

The annual camp meeting of the Evangelical Methodist Church Conference takes place in July at Oakland Mills Methodist Campground, located in Oakland Mills, Pennsylvania

Methodist preachers are known for promulgating the doctrines of the new birth and entire sanctification to the public at events such as tent revivals and camp meetings, which they believe is the reason that God raised them up into existence. Throughout the United States, several camp meeting facilities were founded, many of which remain operational to this day. For example, the Balls Creek Campground is a popular Methodist camp meeting that was formed in 1853. In 1869, the Ocean Grove Camp-Meeting Association was founded, running a popular Methodist camp meeting at Ocean Grove, New Jersey. Methodists flocked to the area, especially around major feasts of the Church, such as during Christmastide. Sunday Sabbatarian principles were practiced, with swimming being forbidden on the Lord's Day, as well as the gates to the city being locked on that day. Ocean Grove "prohibited other activities deemed not consonant with Christian living--dancing, cardplaying, and the sale of liquor." On Sunday, 31 May 1807, the first Camp Meeting was held in England at Mow Cop. At the time, Wesleyan Methodists disapproved and subsequently expelled Hugh Bourne "because you have a tendency to set up other than the ordinary worship.". He eventually formed the Primitive Methodist Church. The Wesleyan Methodist Church and the Primitive Methodist Church in Great Britain later reunited to form the Methodist Church of Great Britain).

During his visits to England, Lorenzo Dow brought reports of North American camp meetings. Hugh Bourne, William Clowes and Daniel Shoebotham saw this as an answer to complaints from members of the Harriseahead Methodists that their weeknight prayer meeting was too short. Bourne also saw these as an antidote to the general debauchery of the Wakes week in that part of the Staffordshire Potteries, one of the reasons why he continued organising camp meetings in spite of the opposition from the Wesleyan authorities.

The pattern of the Primitive Methodist camp meeting was as a time of prayer and preaching from the Bible. In the first camp meeting, four separate "preaching stations" had been set up by the afternoon, each with an audience, while in between others spent the time praying.

From May 1807 to the establishing of Primitive Methodism as a denomination in 1811, a series of 17 camp meetings was held. There were a number of different venues beyond Mow Cop, including Norton-in-the-Moors during the Wakes in 1807 (Bourne's target venue), and Ramsor in 1808.

After Bourne and a significant number of his colleagues, including the Standley Methodist Society, had been put out of membership of the Burslem Wesleyan Circuit, they formed a group known as the Camp Meeting Methodists until 1811. That year they joined with the followers of William Clowes, known as the "Clowesites".

Camp meetings were a regular feature of Primitive Methodist life throughout the 19th century, and still survive today. The annual late May Bank Holiday weekend meetings at Cliff College are one example. A number of tents are set up around the site, each featuring a different preacher.

The Allegheny Wesleyan Methodist Connection holds its camp meetings annually at Methodist Camp in Stoneboro, Pennsylvania. The Evangelical Methodist Church Conference has an annual denomination-wide camp meeting at Oakland Mills Methodist Campground in Juniata County, Pennsylvania. Each conference of the Bible Methodist Connection of Churches owns land on which its camp meetings are held each year. The Primitive Methodist Church also has camp meetings in its districts. Hollow Rock Campmeeting in Toronto, Ohio is attended annually by Free Methodists, Global Methodists, and Wesleyan Methodists. Many United Methodist churches also hold yearly camp meetings, such as the Shiloh United Methodist Church Camp Meeting, Northport Indian United Methodist Church and Trinity United Methodist Camp Meeting, for example. Many Free Methodist churches hold camp meetings every year, such as those that take place at the Tri-State Free Methodist Campground.

=== Presbyterianism ===
In 1825, the Presbytery of Hopewell established a network of camp meetings.

The Smyrna Presbyterian Church, a congregation of the Presbyterian Church (USA) continues to hold an annual camp meeting at its Camp Smyrna. The Red River Meeting House, belonging to the Cumberland Presbyterian Church, also has a yearly camp meeting.

Seventh-day Adventism

The Seventh-day Adventist church has been holding camp meetings for over 150 years, and currently offers approximately 60 annual camp meeting sites in North America.

== Former camp meetings ==
Though a number of camp meetings take place among various denominations today, some camp meeting grounds have fallen into disuse or diverged from their original use and ownership. These include Rehoboth Beach, Delaware, founded as a Methodist camp meeting in 1873 and now a beach resort town. Its temperance fountain remains. Old Orchard Beach, Maine, similarly became a seaside resort.

== See also ==
- Category:Camp meeting grounds
- Communion season (Reformed)
- Summer services (Laestadian Lutheran)
- Tent revival (Methodist, Pentecostal, Baptist)
- Revival meeting (Methodist, Pentecostal, Baptist)
