= East Side Gallery =

Berlin Wall Art gallery

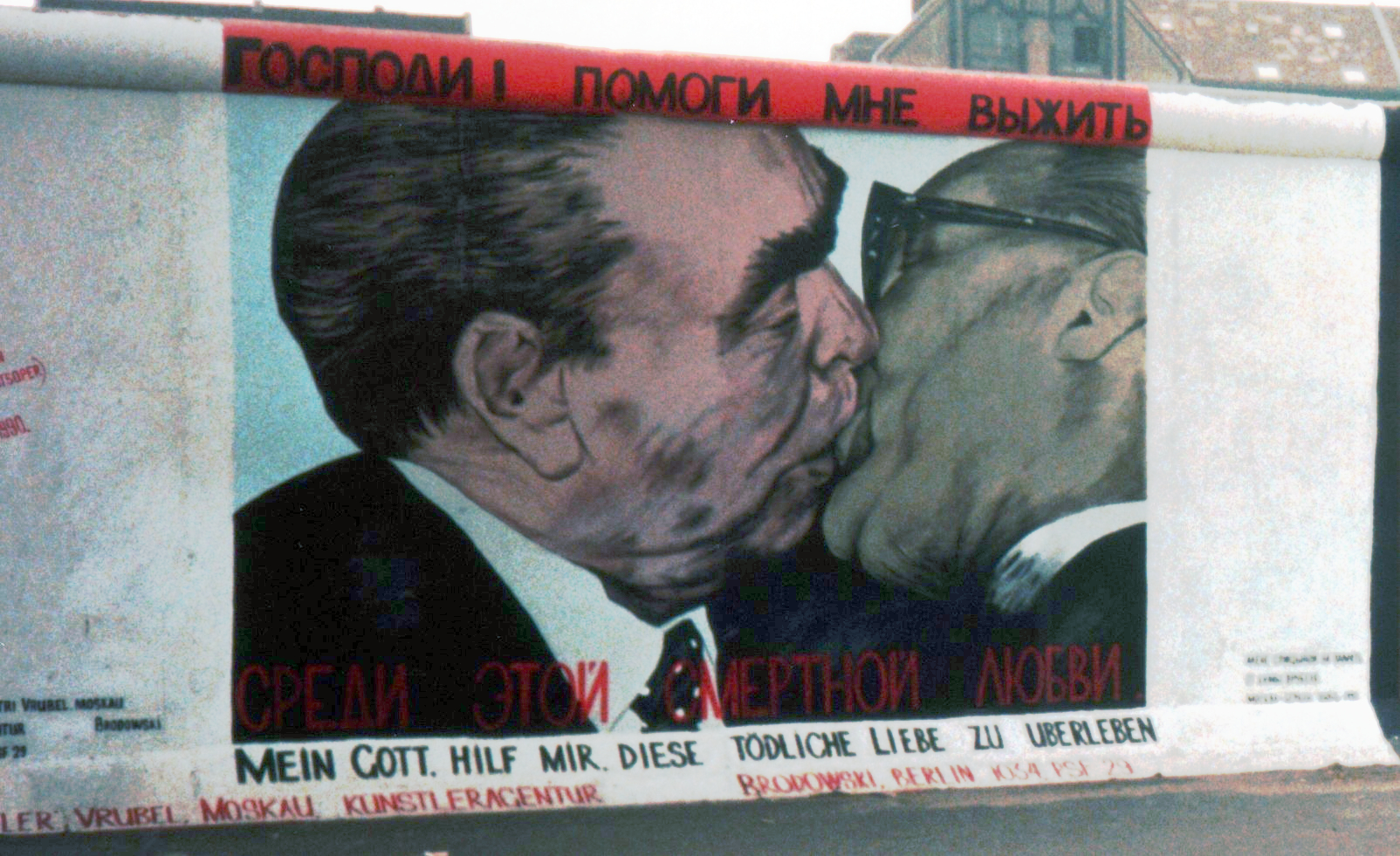
- A section of the East Side Gallery, featuring the mural My God, Help Me to Survive This Deadly Love by Dmitri Vrubel

- Location within Berlin
- Established: 1990
- Location: Mühlenstrasse (Mill Street); Berlin, Germany
- Type: Art gallery, border art
- Website: eastsidegalleryexhibition.com

The East Side Gallery memorial in Berlin-Friedrichshain is a permanent open-air gallery on the longest surviving section of the Berlin Wall in Mühlenstraße between the Berlin Ostbahnhof and the Oberbaumbrücke along the Spree. It consists of a series of murals painted directly on a 1,316 m (4,318 ft) long remnant of the Berlin Wall, located near the centre of Berlin, on Mühlenstraße in Friedrichshain-Kreuzberg.

In the spring of 1990, after the opening of the Berlin Wall, this section was painted by 118 artists from 21 countries. The artists commented on the political changes of 1989/90 in a good hundred paintings on the side of the Wall that was formerly facing East Berlin. Due to urban development measures, it is no longer completely preserved, and instead of the originals from then, only the replicas from 2009 exist today.

The actual border at this point was the Kreuzberg bank of the Spree. The gallery is, for the most part, located on the western wall, which closed off the border area to East Berlin. This wall, facing inwards towards West Berlin, was much thicker and more fortified than its outward-facing counterpart. However, a small portion of the so-called "hinterland" wall has managed to survive, despite its weaker structure, as part of the memorial. Mühlenstrasse, one of the main arterial roads to the south, ran along these border installations. Due to the spatial conditions, the previously usual concrete pipes were already installed here, so that the interior wall in this area was atypically optically, but somewhat elevated, resembling the outer wall.

The gallery has official status as a Denkmal, or heritage-protected landmark. According to the Künstlerinitiative East Side Gallery e.V., an association of the artists involved in the project, "The East Side Gallery is understood as a monument to the fall of the Berlin Wall and the peaceful negotiation of borders and conventions between societies and people", and has more than three million visitors per year.

== Description ==
The Gallery consists of 105 paintings by artists from all over the world, painted in 1990 on the east side of the Berlin Wall. The actual border at this point had been the river Spree. The gallery is located on the so-called hinterland mauer, which closed the border to West Berlin.

It is possibly the largest and longest-lasting open-air gallery in the world. Paintings from Jürgen Grosse alias INDIANO, Dimitri Vrubel, Siegfrid Santoni, Bodo Sperling, Kasra Alavi, Kani Alavi, Jim Avignon, Thierry Noir, Ingeborg Blumenthal, Ignasi Blanch i Gisbert, Kim Prisu,

Hervé Morlay VR and others have followed.

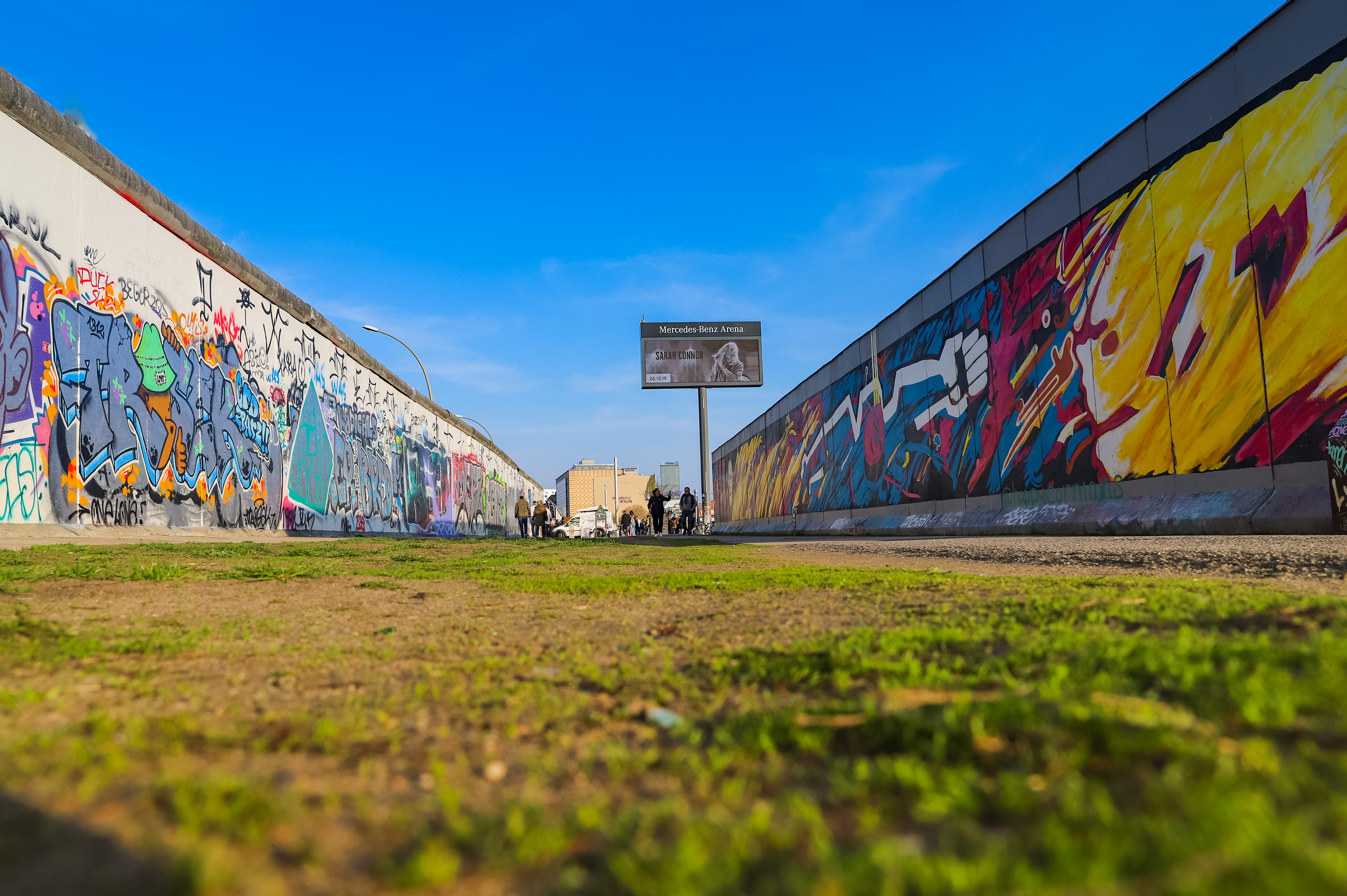
East Side Gallery, Berlin

The East Side Gallery was founded following the successful merger of the two German artists' associations VBK and BBK. The founding members were the speche of the Federal Association of Artists BBK Bodo Sperling, Barbara Greul Aschanta, Jörg Kubitzki and David Monti.

In July 2006, to facilitate access to the river Spree from the Mercedes-Benz Arena, a 40 m (130 ft) section was moved somewhat west, parallel to the original position.

A 23m (75ft) section was scheduled to be removed on 1 March 2013 to make way for luxury apartments. None of the artists whose work would be destroyed were informed of these plans. The demolition work actually started on 1 March 2013. According to the German news programme FOCUS, authorities were not aware of the start of the demolition. Due to the involvement of protesters, demolition was postponed until at least 18 March 2013.

== Renovation ==
Two-thirds of the paintings are badly damaged by erosion, graffiti, and vandalism. One-third have been restored by a non-profit organization which started work in 2000. The objective of this organization is the eventual restoration and preservation of all the paintings. Full restoration, particularly of the central sections, was projected for 2008. Remediation began in May 2009.

The restoration process has been marked by major conflict. Eight of the artists of 1990 refused to paint their own images again after they were completely destroyed by the renovation. In order to defend the copyright, they founded Founder Initiative East Side, with other artists whose images were copied without permission. Bodo Sperling launched a test case in the Berlin State Court in May 2011, represented by the Munich art lawyer Hannes Hartung and with the support of the German VG Bild-Kunst. The court would address the question of whether art should be listed as destroyed and then re-copied without the respective artists' permission. The outcome of the trial would be a landmark declaration for European art law.

== Future of the East Side Gallery ==
As of 1 November 2018, the State of Berlin has been responsible for the Park and the Spree and East Side Park plots with the elements of the former Berlin Wall known as the East Side Gallery from the property of the State of Berlin in the transfer of ownership to the Berlin Wall Foundation. Parliament approved a proposal from the Senator for Culture and Europe that had passed the main committee. The Berlin Wall Foundation received the mandate for the structural maintenance of the East Side Gallery monument, the maintenance of the associated public green space and the mediation of the historical site of remembrance.

In the future, visitors to the East Side Gallery should receive more information and historical classification. For this purpose, the foundation has launched an extensive management program. The aim all new mediation offers is to illustrate the unique dual character of the historical place: on the one hand, as an artistic testimony and symbol of joy over the peaceful overcoming of the German division, and on the other hand, as a testimony to the German Democratic Republic border regime. Both narratives need to be related in a common narrative.

== Artists ==
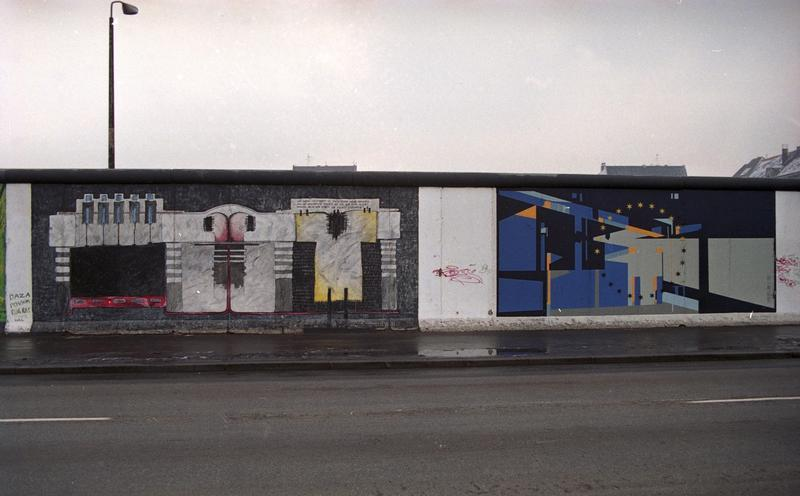
Last winter days 1990, painting #17 Siegfrid Santoni, painting #18 Bodo Sperling

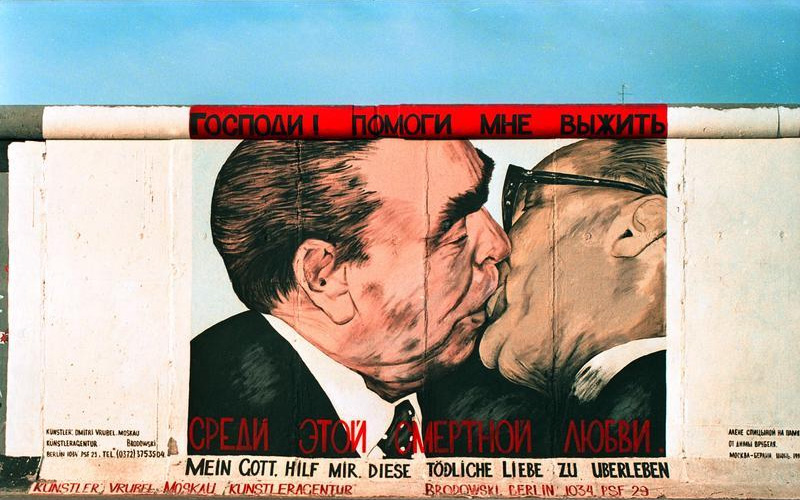
Condition of the Mural on July 25th 1991

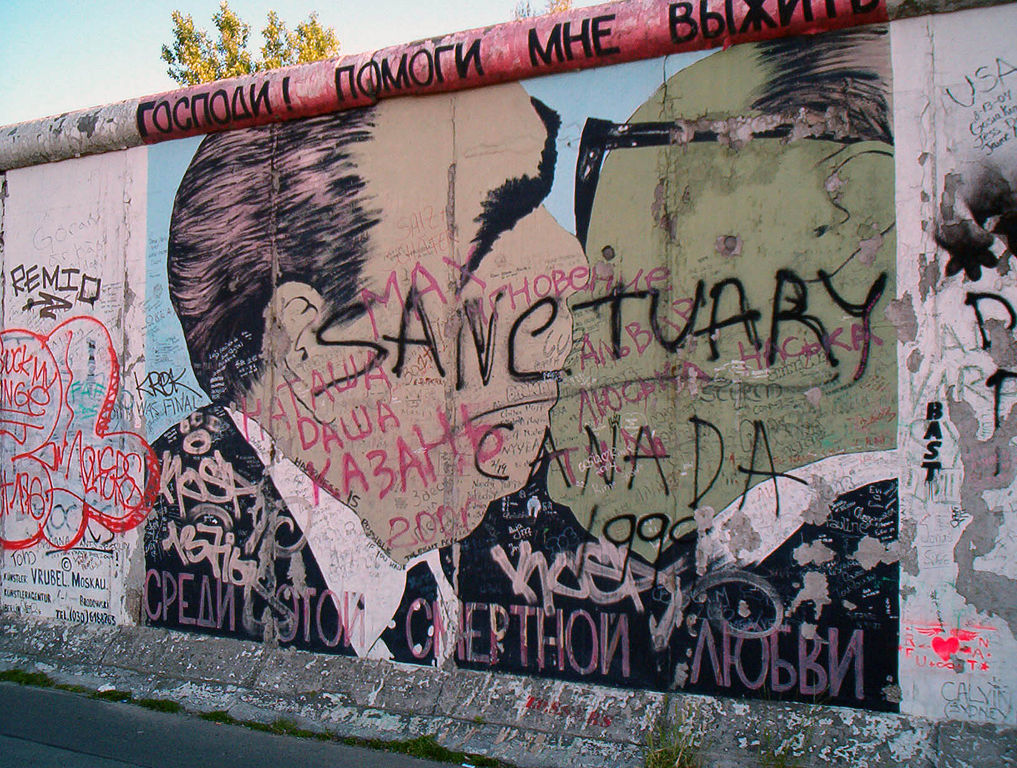
Condition of the mural in 2005

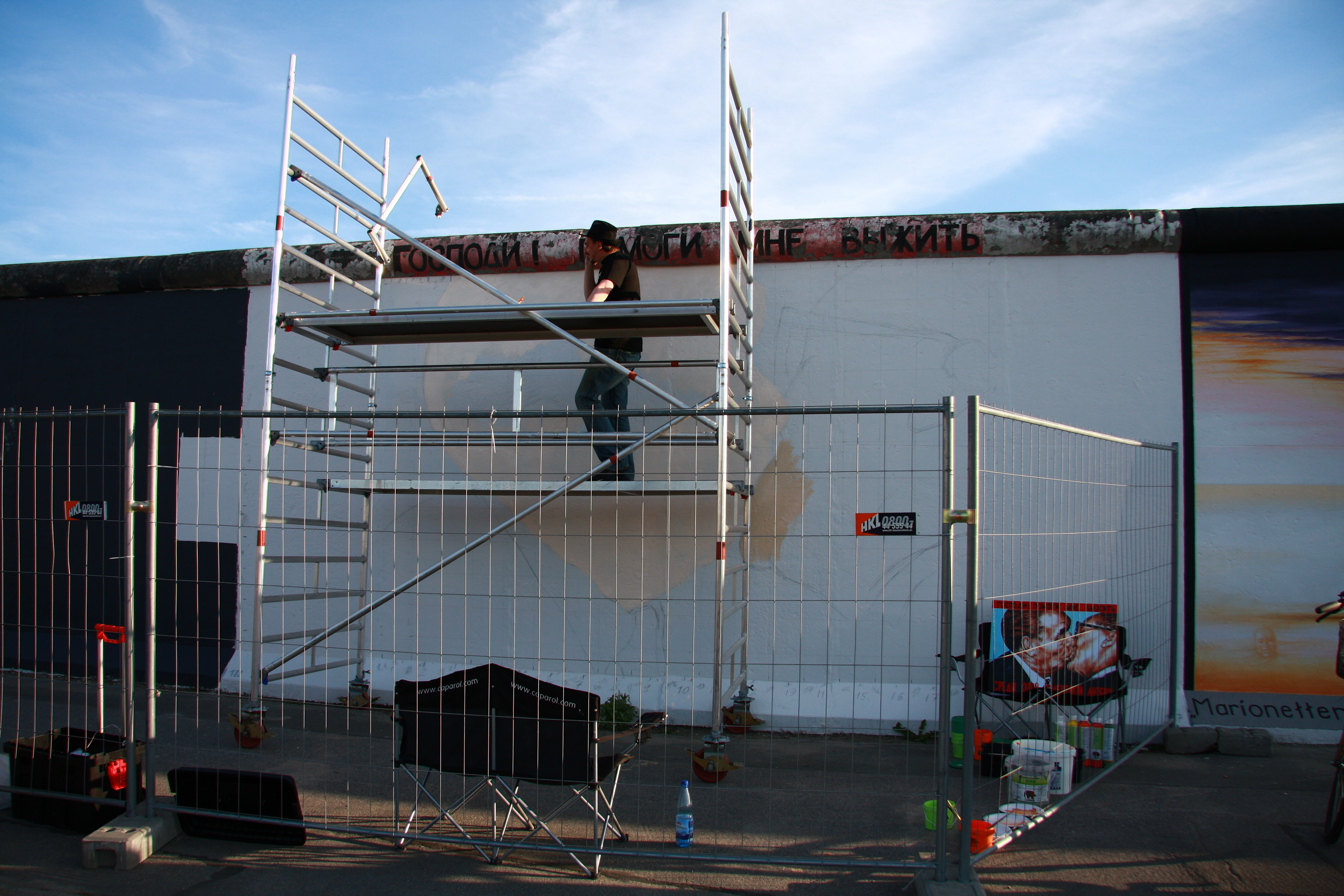
Dimitri Vrubel during restoration in June 2009

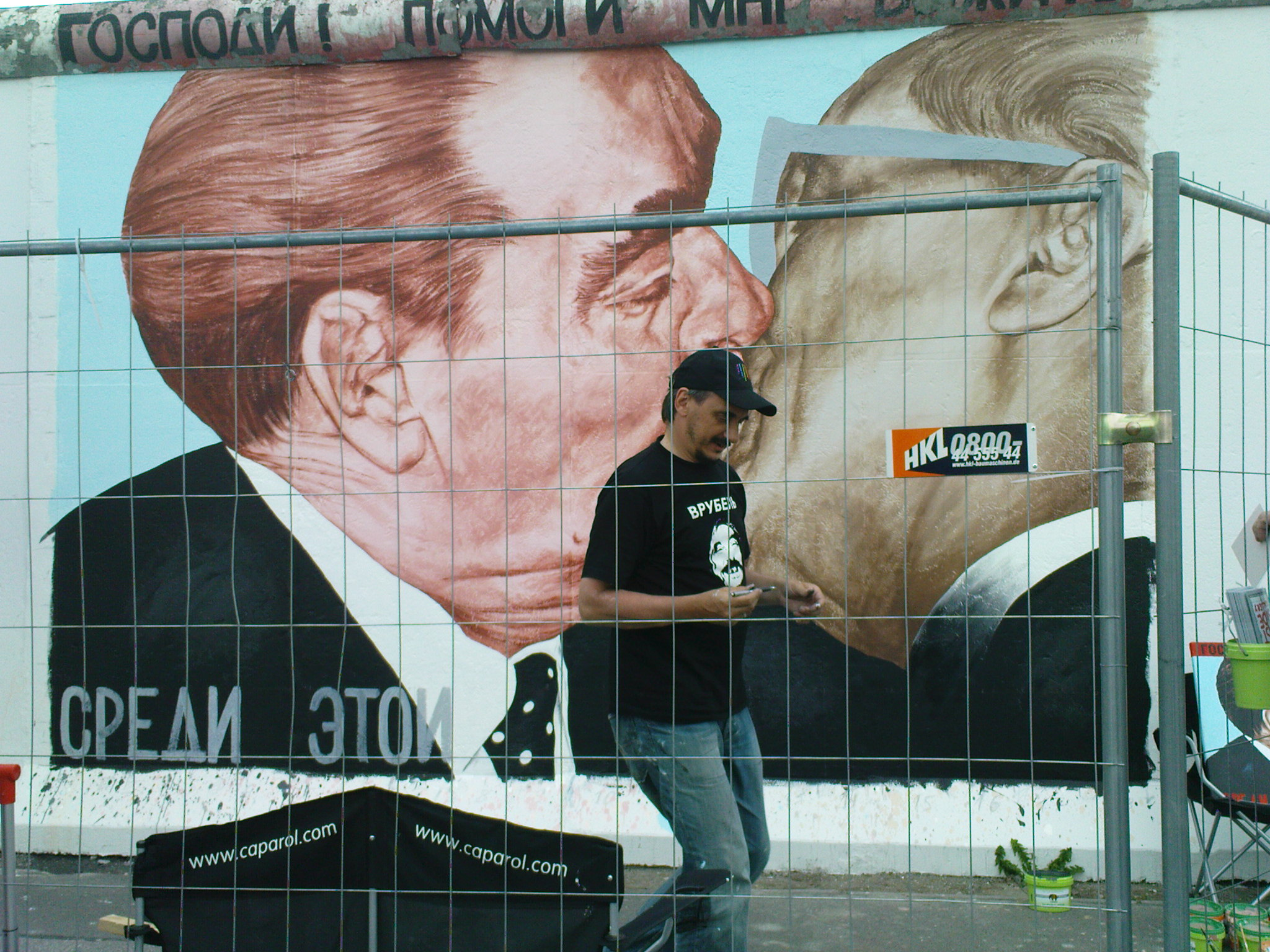
Condition of the mural in 2009 after restoration

Featured here is a depiction (painting #25) of Leonid Brezhnev and Erich Honecker kissing as painted by Dmitri Vrubel. On the left is the condition of the painting in 1991 and at the right is the condition after restoration in 2009. The Russian words at the top read "God! help me stay alive"; and continue at the bottom "Among this deadly love."

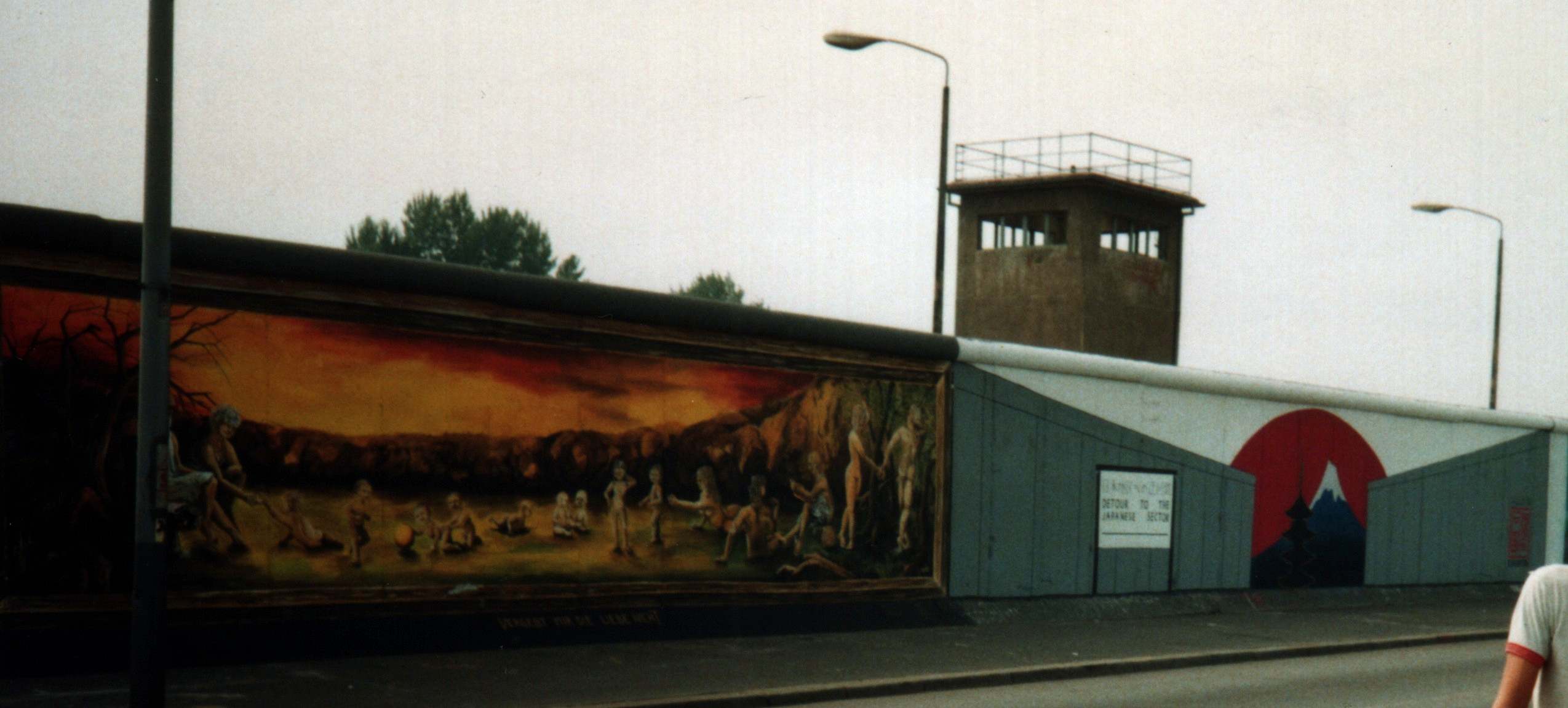
Detour to the Japanese Sector in August 1990 while a watchtower still stands in the background

Please respect this historic work of art (A note of 2005)

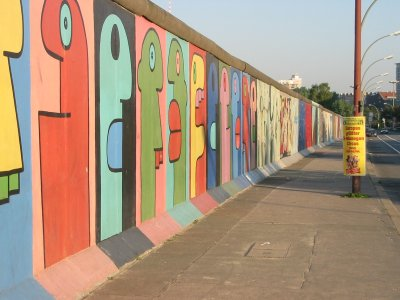
Some heads by Thierry Noir

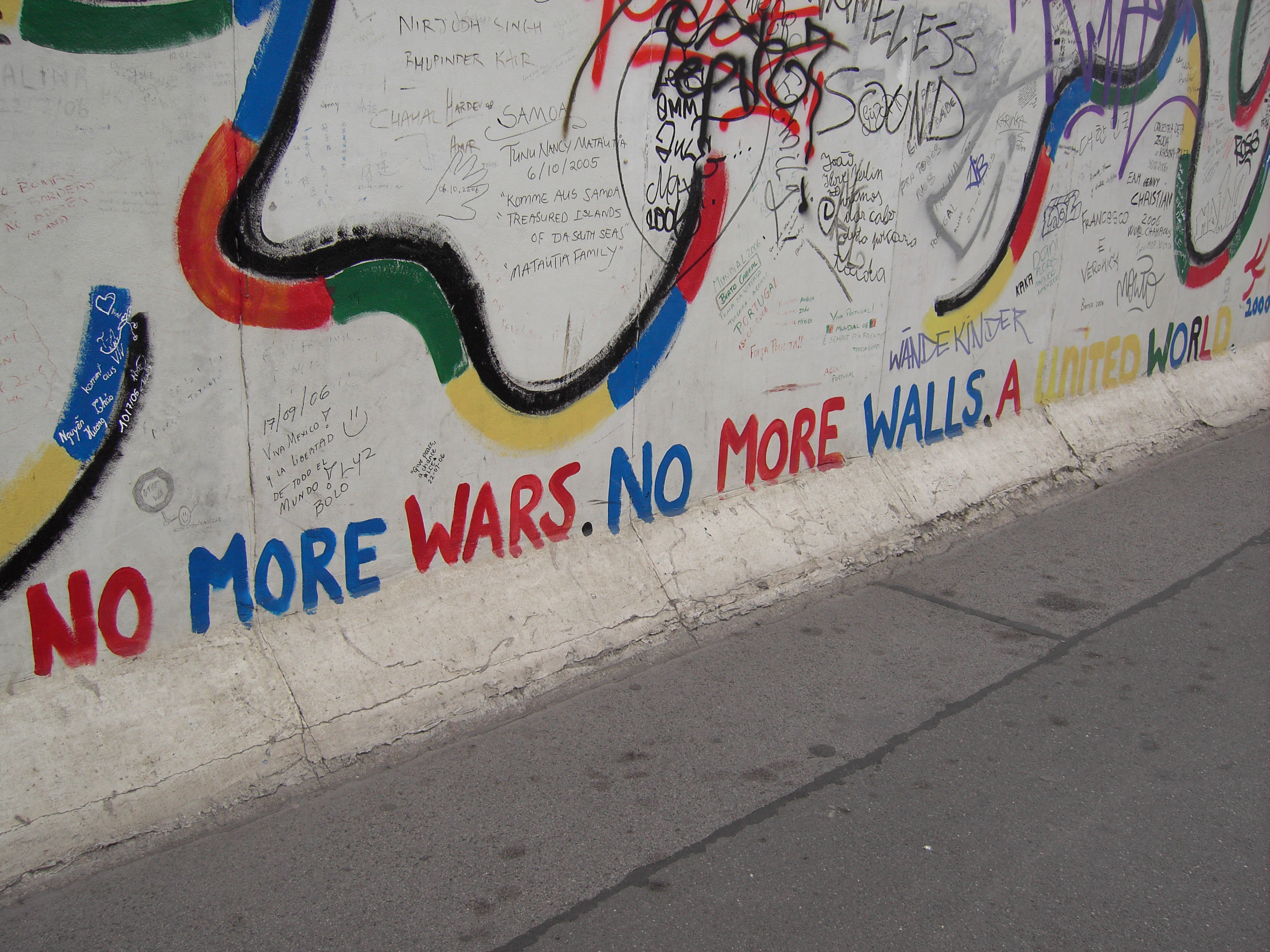
A popular slogan graffitied on one of the sections of the East Side Gallery, reading: "No more wars. No more walls. A united world."

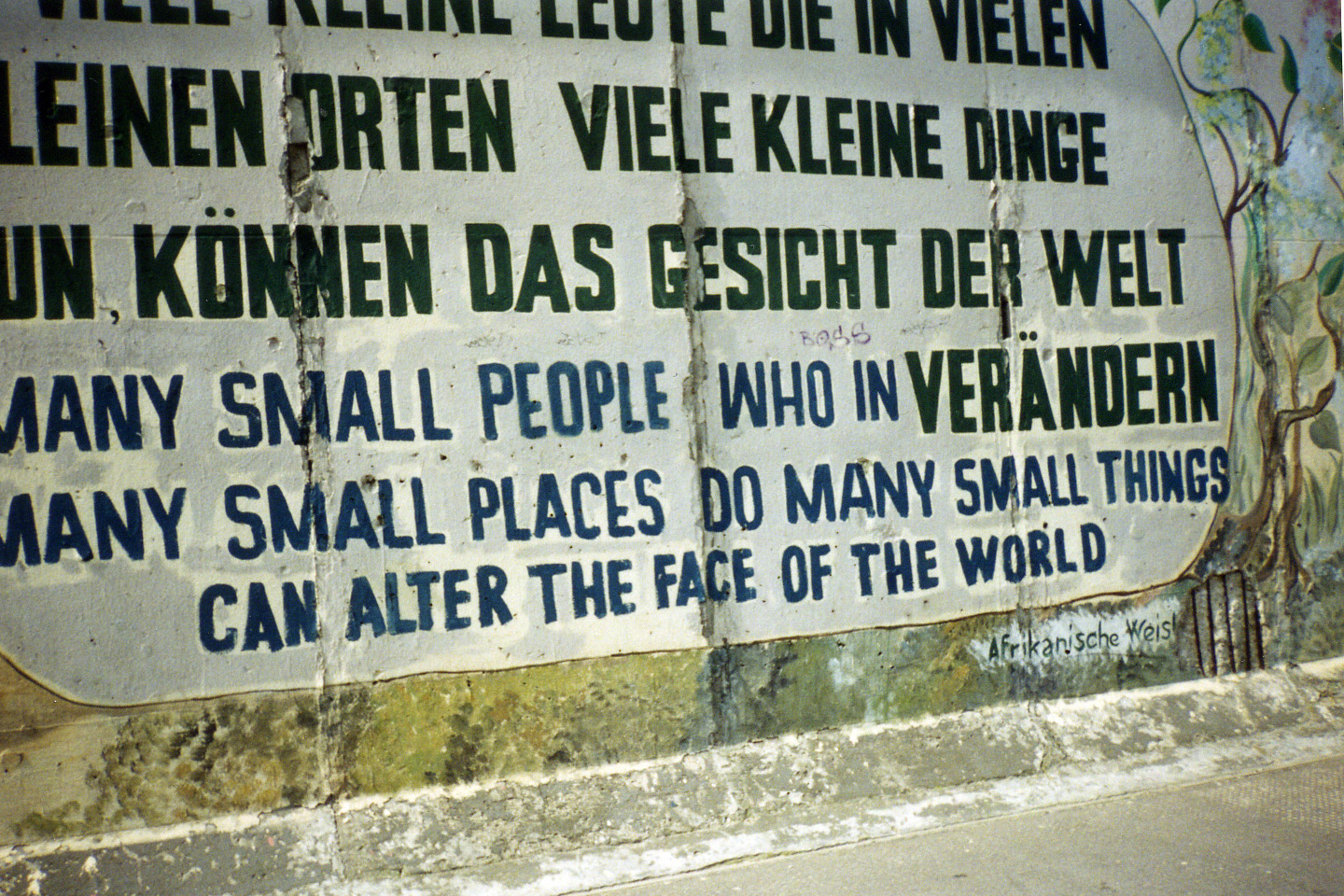
A slogan stating: "Many small people, who in many small places, do many small things, can alter the face of the world."

1. Oskar: (Hans Bierbrauer)
2. Narenda K. Jain: Die sieben Stufen der Erleuchtung
3. Fulvio Pinna: Hymne an das Glück
4. Kikue Miyatake: Paradise Out Of The Darkness
5. Günther Schaefer: Vaterland
6. Georg Lutz Rauschebart
7. César Olhagaray: untitled
8. Jens-Helge Dahmen: Pneumohumanoiden
9. Gábor Simon: Space Magic
10. Siegrid Müller-Holtz: Gemischte Gefühle
11. Ursula Wünsch: Frieden für Alles
12. Oliver Feind, Ulrike Zott: untitled
13. Ana Leonor Rodriges
14. Muriel Raoux, Kani Alavi: untitled
15. Muriel Raoux: Les Yeux Ouverts
16. Ditmar Reiter: untitled
17. Santoni: Trilogie-Maschine Macht
18. Bodo Sperling: The Trans-formation of the penta gram to a peace star in a big Europe without walls
19. Barbara Greul Aschanta: Deutschland im November
20. Willi Berger: Soli Deo Gloria
21. André Sécrit, Karsten Thomas: Du hast gelernt, was Freiheit ist
22. Theodor Chezlav Tezhik: The Big Kremlin's Wind
23. Catrin Resch: Europas Frühling
24. Irina Dubrowskaja: Die Wand muss weichen wenn der Meteorit der Liebe kommt
25. Dmitri Vrubel: Mein Gott hilf mir, diese tödliche Liebe zu überleben
26. Marc Engel: Marionetten eines abgesetzten Stücks
27. Alexey Taranin: untitled
28. Michail Serebrjakow: Diagonale Lösung des Problems
29. Rosemarie Schinzler: untitled
30. Rosemarie Schinzler: Wachsen lassen
31. Christine Fuchs: How's God? She's Black
32. Gerhard Lahr: Berlyn
33. Karin Porath: Freiheit fängt innen an
34. Lutz Pottien-Seiring: untitled
35. Wjatschleslaw Schjachow: Die Masken
36. Dmitri Vrubel: Danke, Andrej Sacharow
37. Jeanett Kipka: untitled
38. Gamil Gimajew: untitled
39. Jürgen Große: Die Geburt der Kachinas
40. Christopher Frank: Stay Free
41. Andreas Paulun: Amour, Paix
42. Kim Prisu (Joaquim A. Goncalves Borregana): 1990 O povo unido nuca sera vencido 2009 Métamorphose des existences
43. Greta Csatlòs (Künstlergruppe Ciccolina): Sonic Malade
44. Henry Schmidt: Vergesst mir die Liebe nicht
45. Thomas Klingenstein: Umleitung in den japanischen Sektor
46. Karsten Wenzel: Die Beständigkeit der Ignoranz
47. Pierre-Paul Maillé: untitled
48. Andy Weiß: Geist Reise
49. Gabriel Heimler: Der Mauerspringer
50. Salvadore de Fazio: Dawn of Peace
51. Gerald Kriedner: Götterdämmerung
52. Christos Koutsouras: Einfahrt Tag und Nacht freihalten
53. Yvonne Onischke (geb. Matzat; Künstlername seit 2005 Yoni): Berlin bei Nacht
54. Peter Peinzger: untitled
55. Elisa Budzinski: Wer will, daß die Welt so bleibt, wie sie ist, der will nicht, daß sie bleibt
56. Sabine Kunz: untitled
57. Jay One (Jacky Ramier): untitled
58. Klaus Niethardt: Justitia
59. Mirta Domacinovic: Zeichen in der Reihe
60. Patrizio Porrachia: untitled
61. Ines Bayer, Raik Hönemann: Es gilt viele Mauern abzubauen
62. Thierry Noir: untitled
63. Teresa Casanueva: untitled
64. Stephan Cacciatore: La Buerlinca
65. Karina Bjerregaard, Lotte Haubart: Himlen over Berlin
66. Christine Kühn: Touch the Wall
67. Rodolfo Ricàlo: Vorsicht
68. Birgit Kinder: Test the Rest
69. Margaret Hunter, Peter Russell: untitled
70. Peter Russell: Himmel und Sucher
71. Margaret Hunter: Joint Venture
72. Sándor Rácmolnár: Waiting for a New Prometheus
73. Gábor Imre: untitled
74. Pal Gerber: Sag, welche wunderbaren Träumen halten meinen Sinn umfangen
75. Gábor Gerhes: untitled
76. Sándor Györffy: untitled
77. Gruppe Stellvertretende Durstende
78. Laszlo Erkel (Kentaur): You can see Infinity
79. Kani Alavi: Es geschah im November
80. Jim Avignon: Miriam Butterfly, Tomas Fey: Doin it cool for the East Side
81. Peter Lorenz: untitled
82. Dieter Wien: Der Morgen
83. Jacob Köhler: Lotus
84. Carmen Leidner: Niemandsland
85. Jens Hübner, Andreas Kämper: untitled
86. Hans-Peter Dürhager, Ralf Jesse: Der müde Tod
87. Jolly Kunjappu: Dancing to Freedom
88. Susanne Kunjappu-Jellinek: Curriculum Vitae
89. Mary Mackey: Tolerance
90. Carsten Jost, Ulrike Steglich: Politik ist die Fortsetzung des Krieges mit anderen Mitteln
91. Brigida Böttcher: Flora geht
92. Ignasi Blanch i Gisbert: Parlo d'Amor
93. Kiddy Cidny: Ger-Mania
94. Petra Suntinger, Roland Gützlaff: untitled
95. Andrej Smolak: untitled
96. Youngram Kim-Holdfeld: untitled
97. Karin Velmanns: untitled
98. Rainer Jehle: Denk-Mal, Mahn-Mal
99. Kamel Alavi: untitled
100. Kasra Alavi: Flucht
101. Ingeborg Blumenthal: Der Geist ist wie Spuren der Vögel am Himmel
102. Youngram Kim

== Awards ==
- 2010: 1st special prize "Lived Unity" "365 Landmarks in the Land of Ideas" under the patronage of Federal President Horst Köhler, sponsored by the Federal Government.

== In popular media ==
- The gallery was seen in Wolfgang Becker's movie Goodbye, Lenin!
- The gallery was featured in the fifth leg of The Amazing Race 6 and the sixth leg of The Amazing Race 32.
- The gallery was featured in English indie/rock band Bloc Party's single "Kreuzberg" taken from the album A Weekend in the City
- Panel 32, Gerhard Lahr's "Berlyn" is seen in Anton Corbijn's video for U2's song "One".

== East Side Gallery photos ==
These images are covered by German freedom of panorama rules.

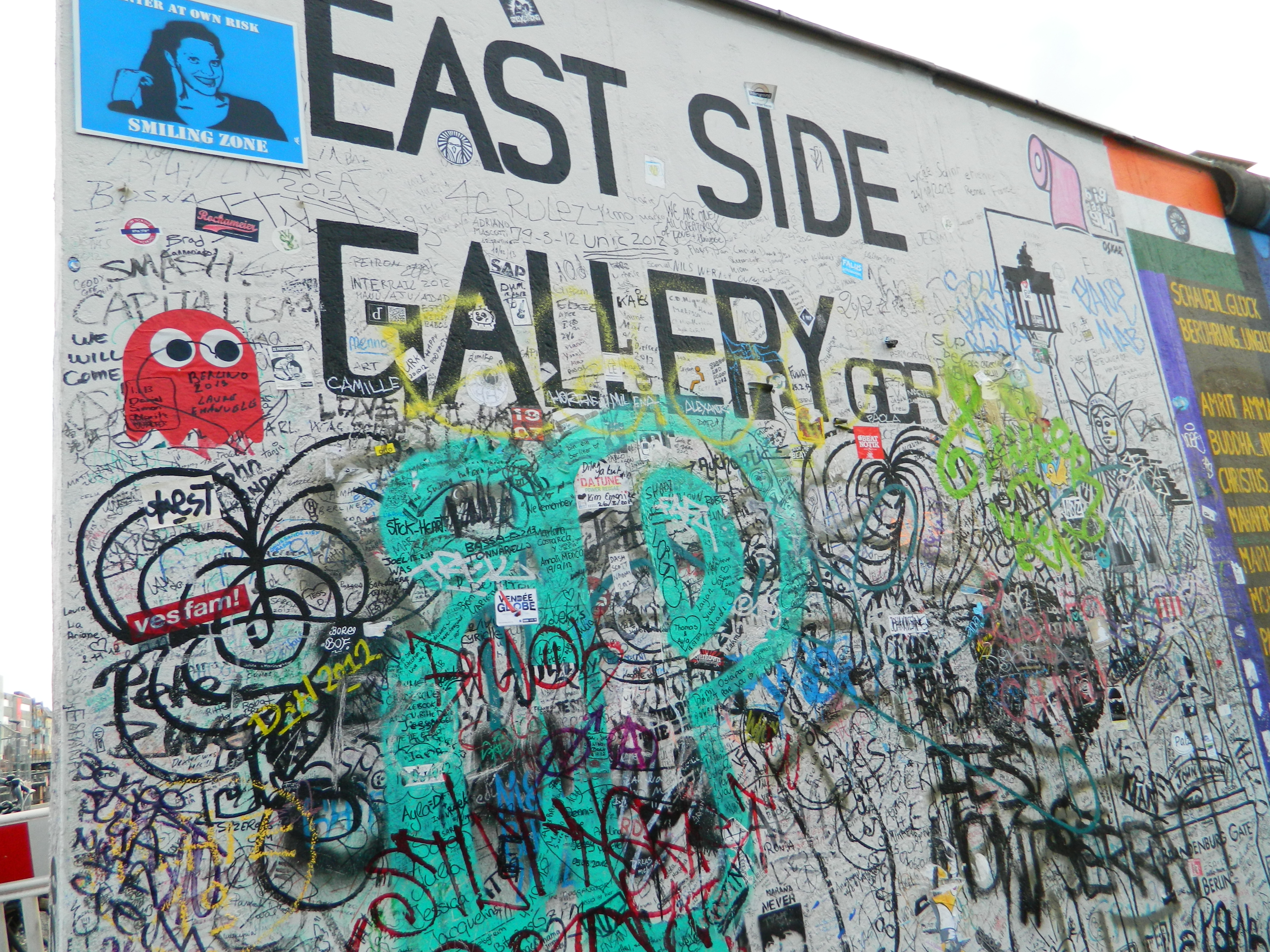

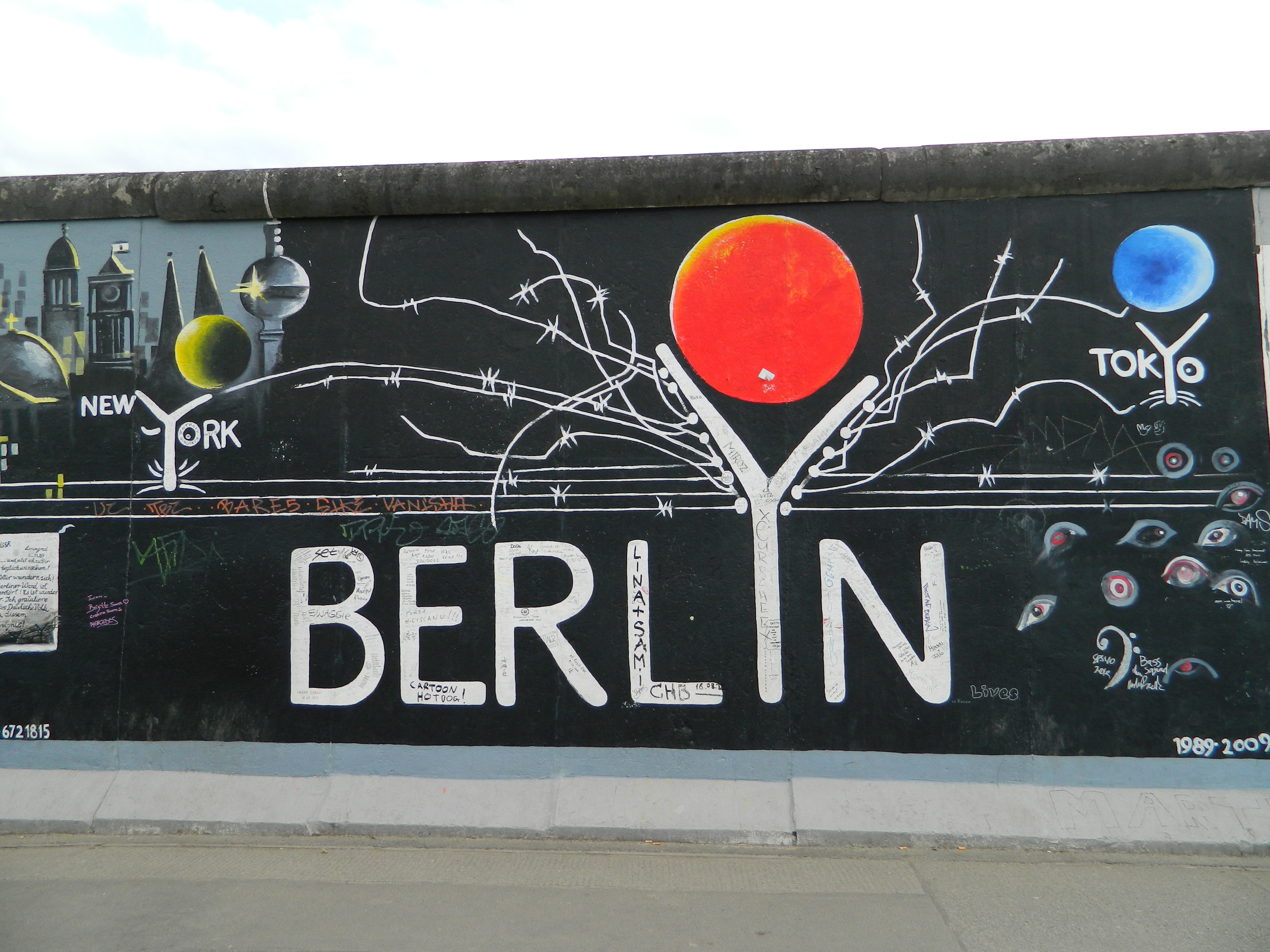

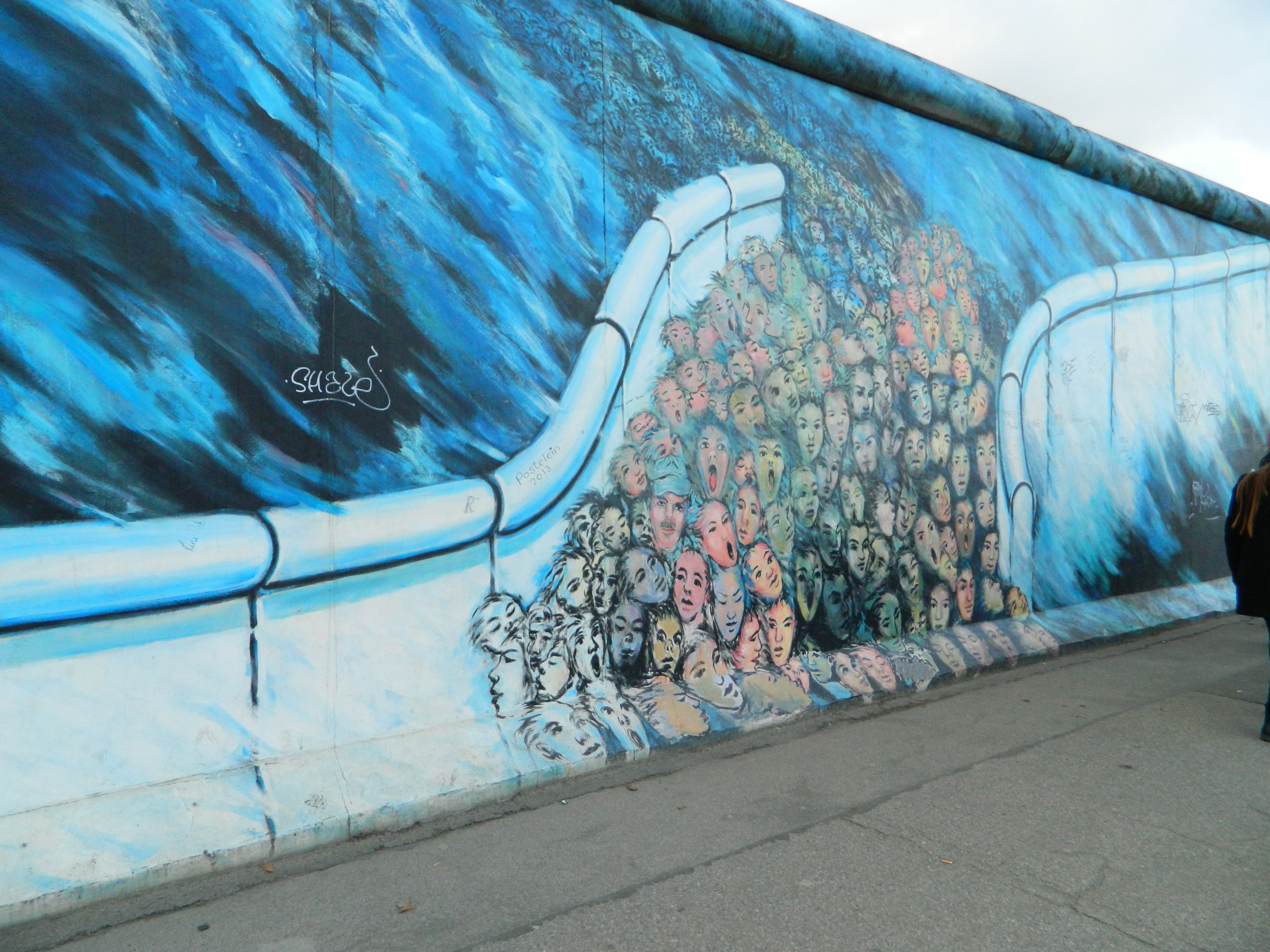

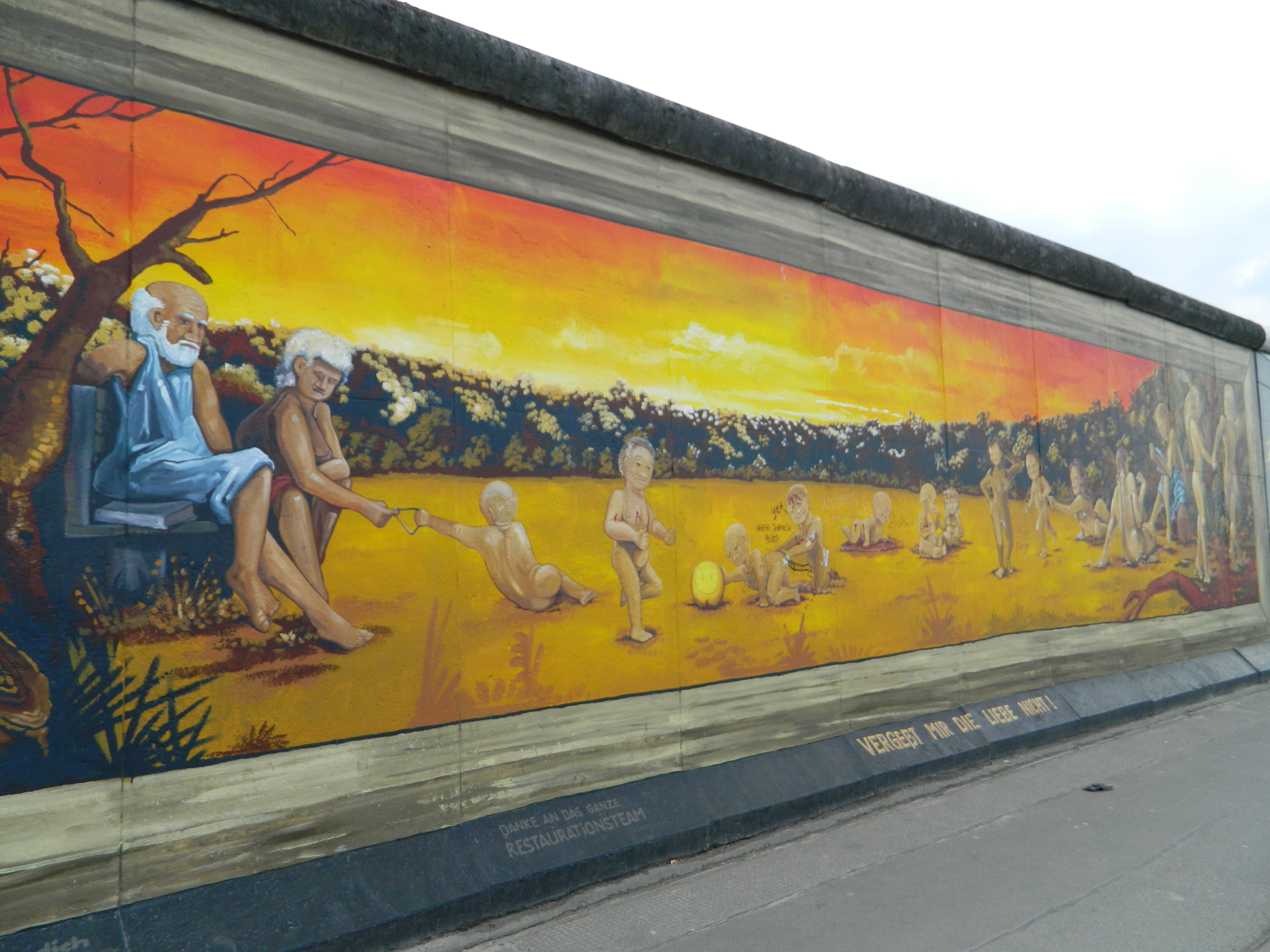

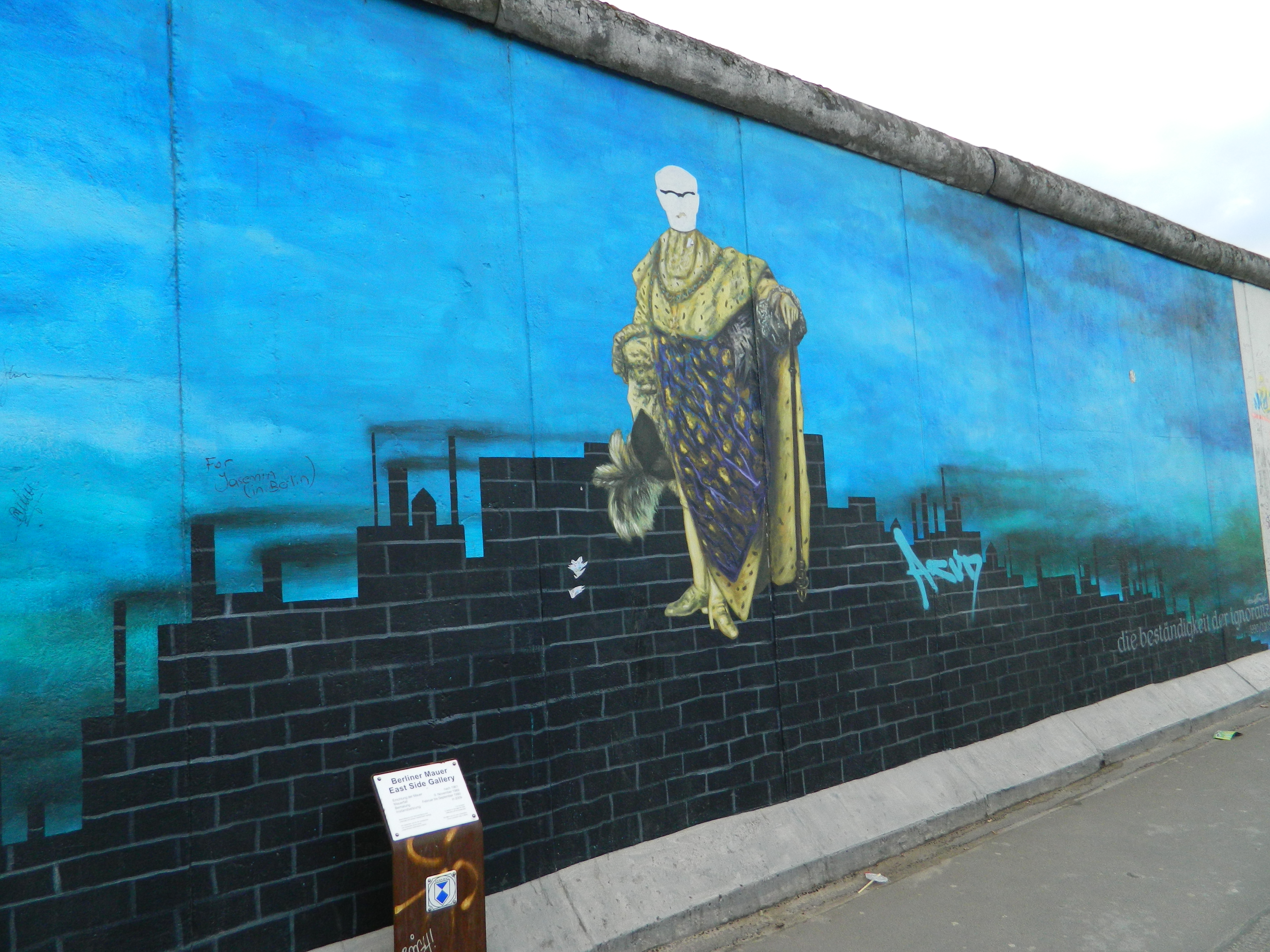

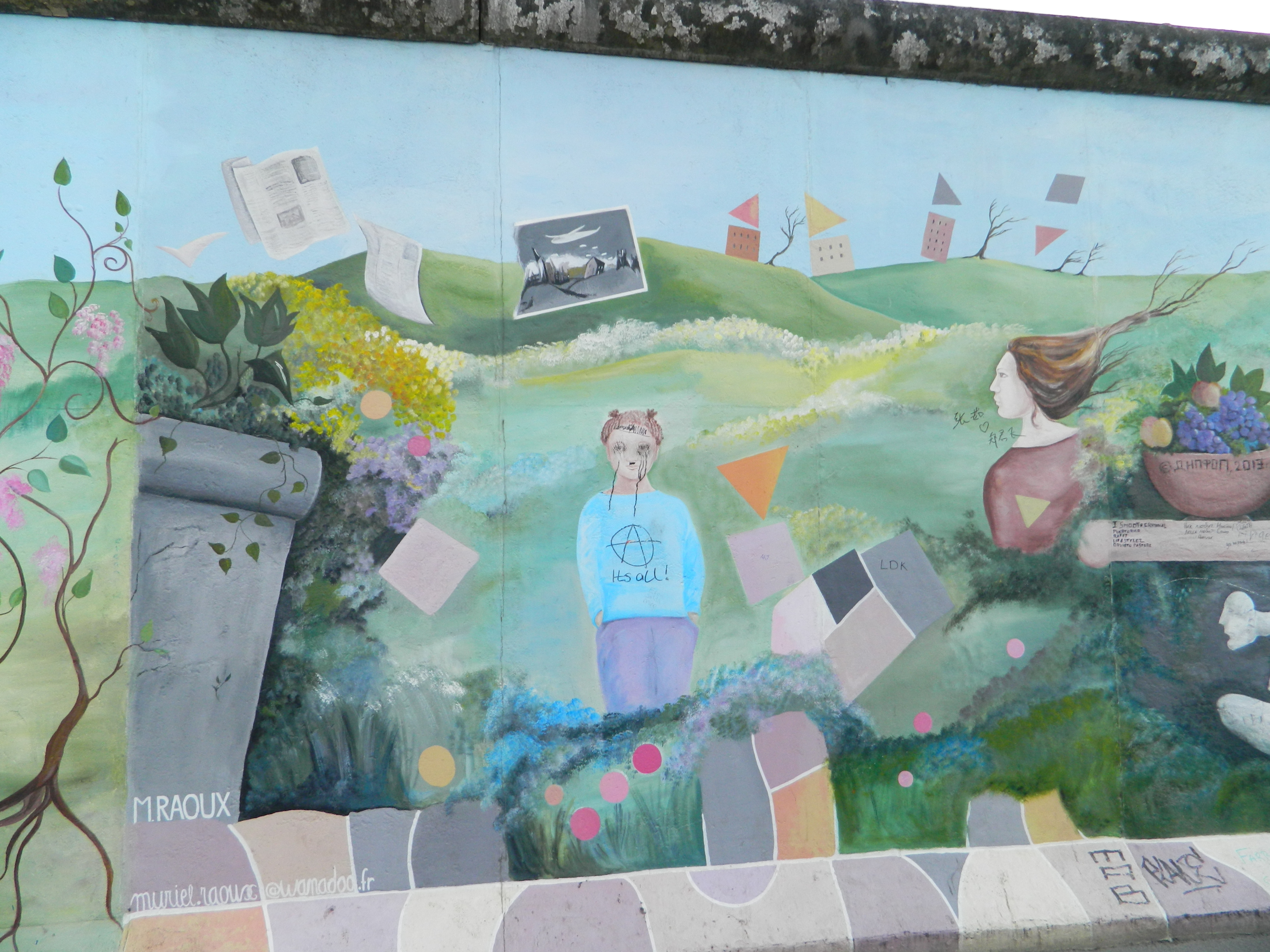

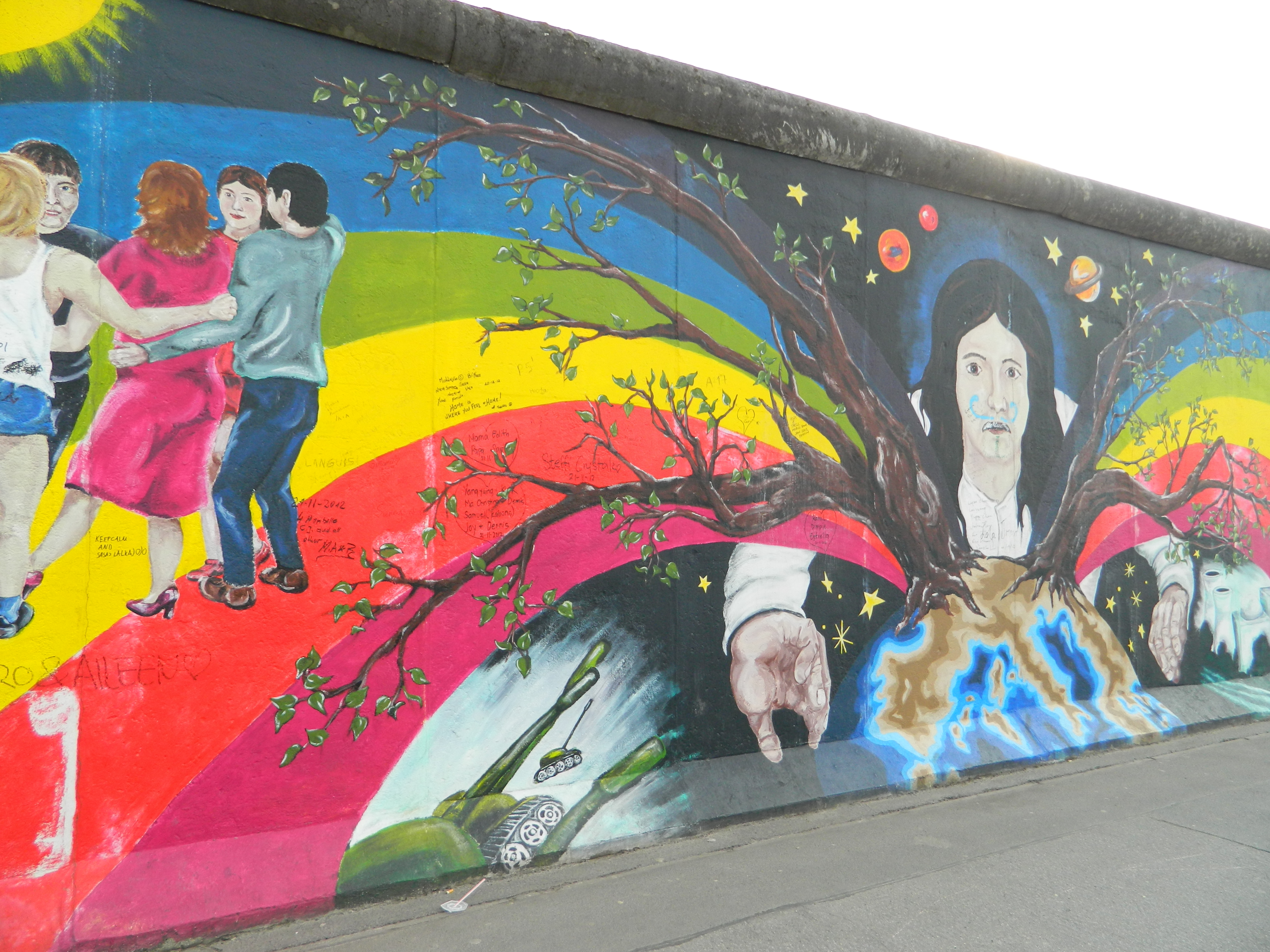

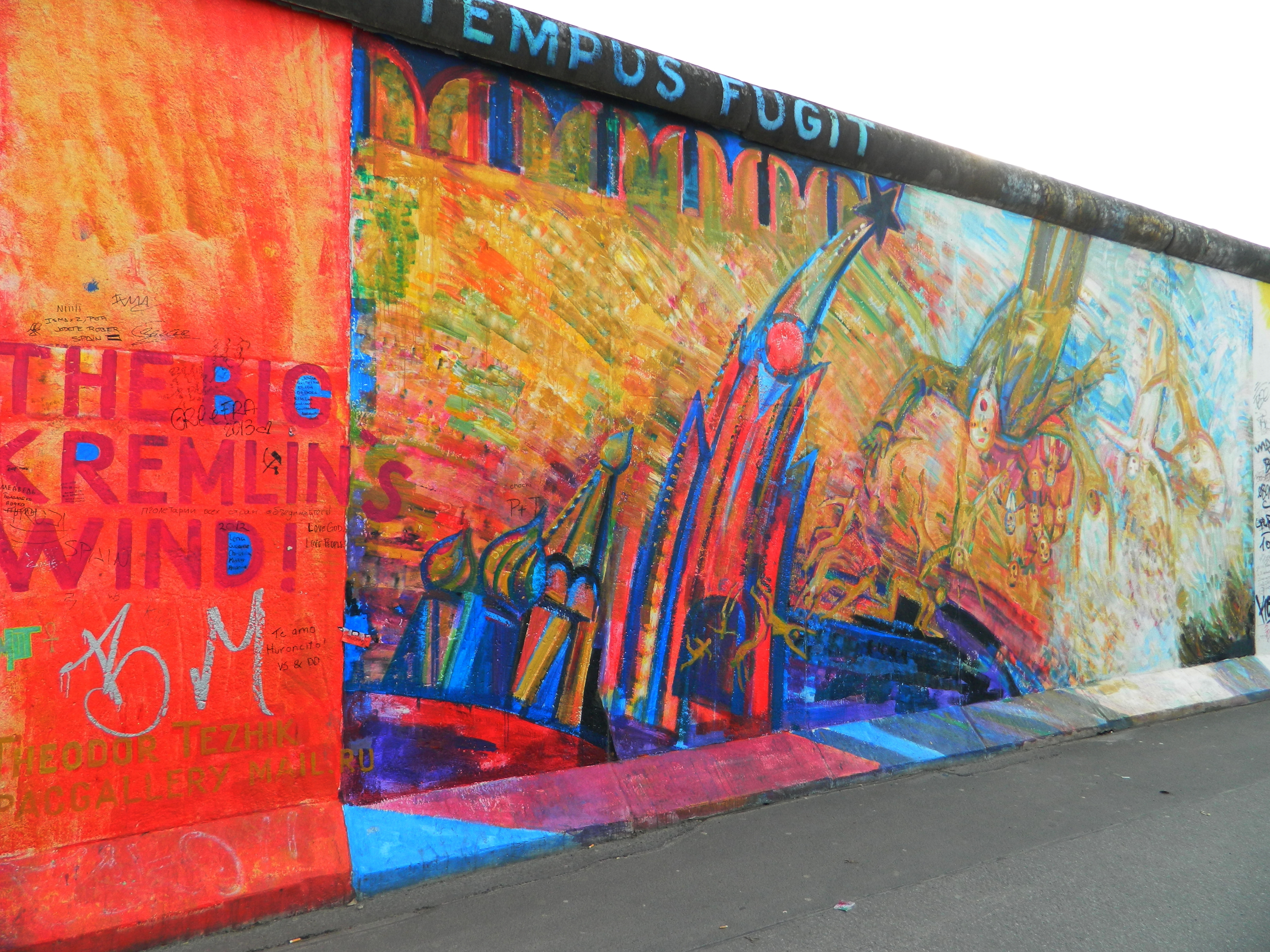

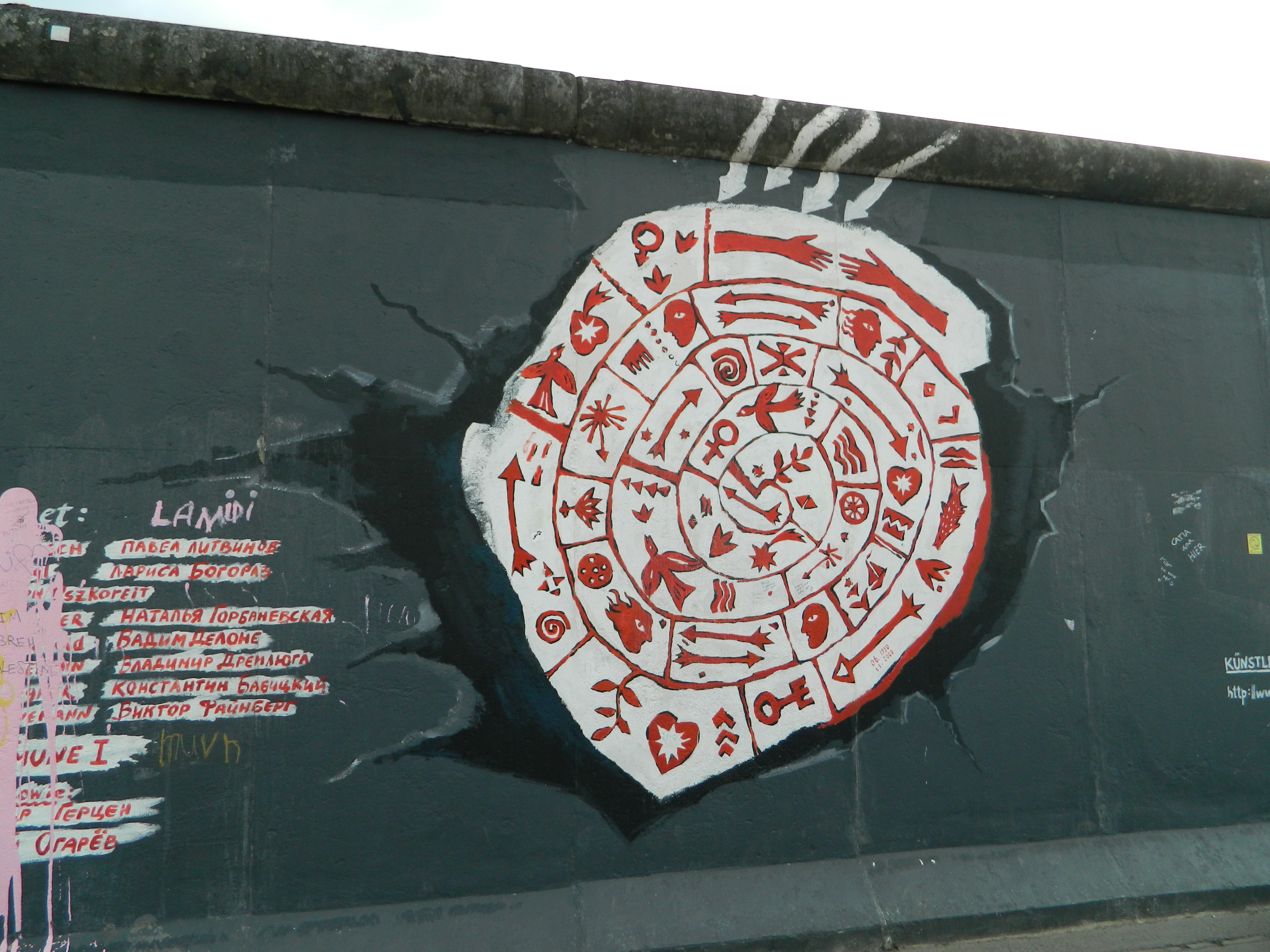

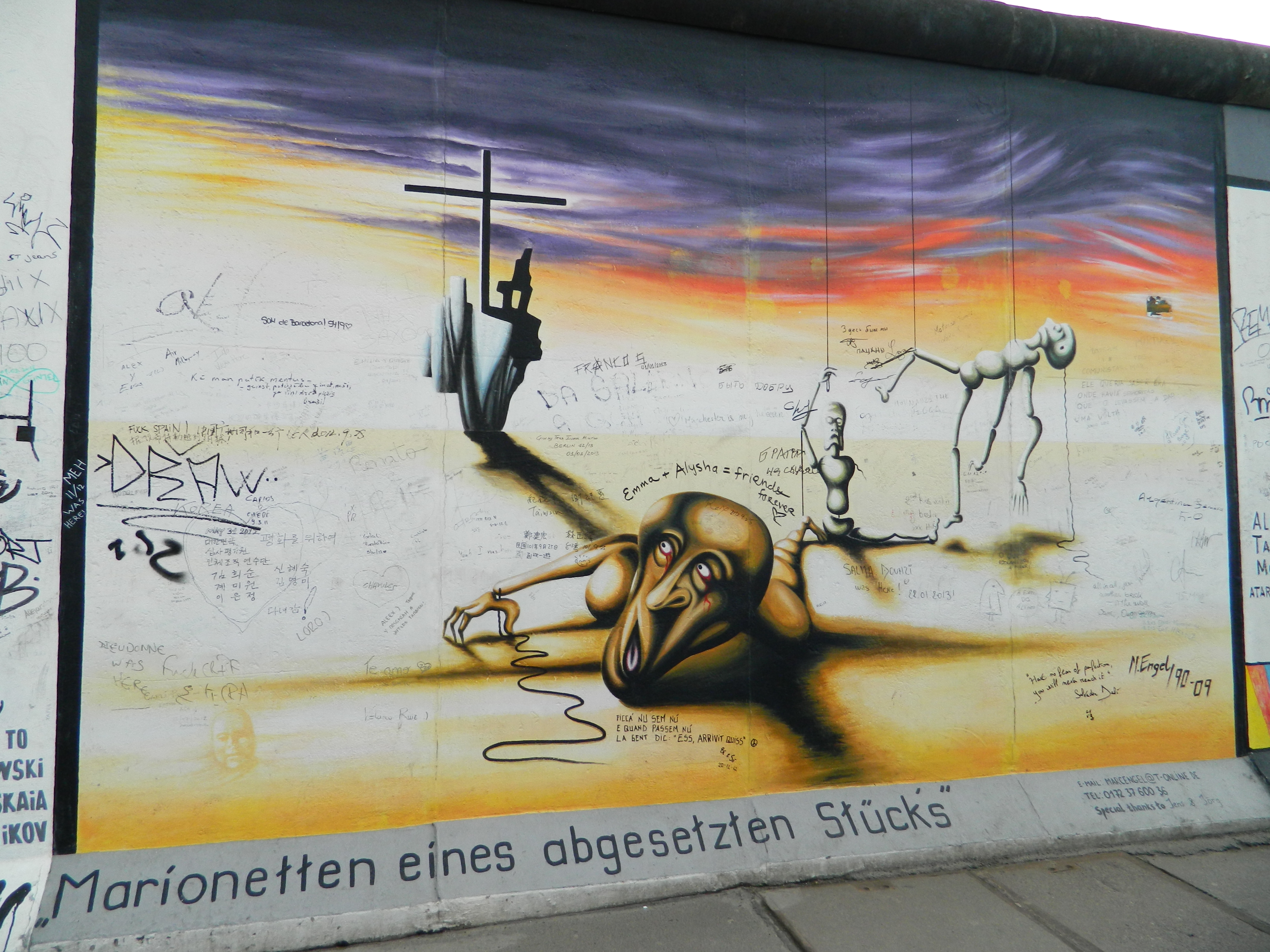

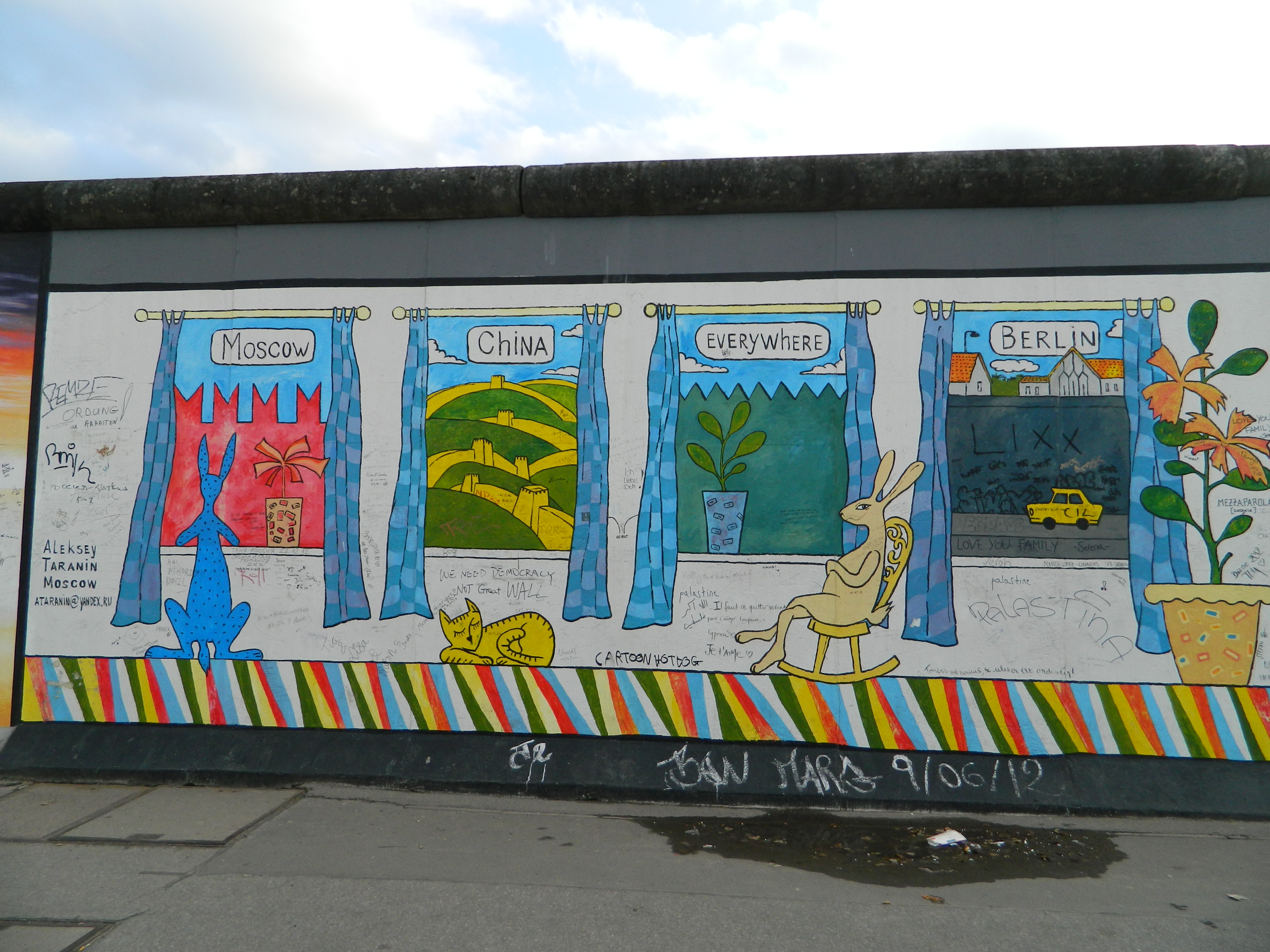

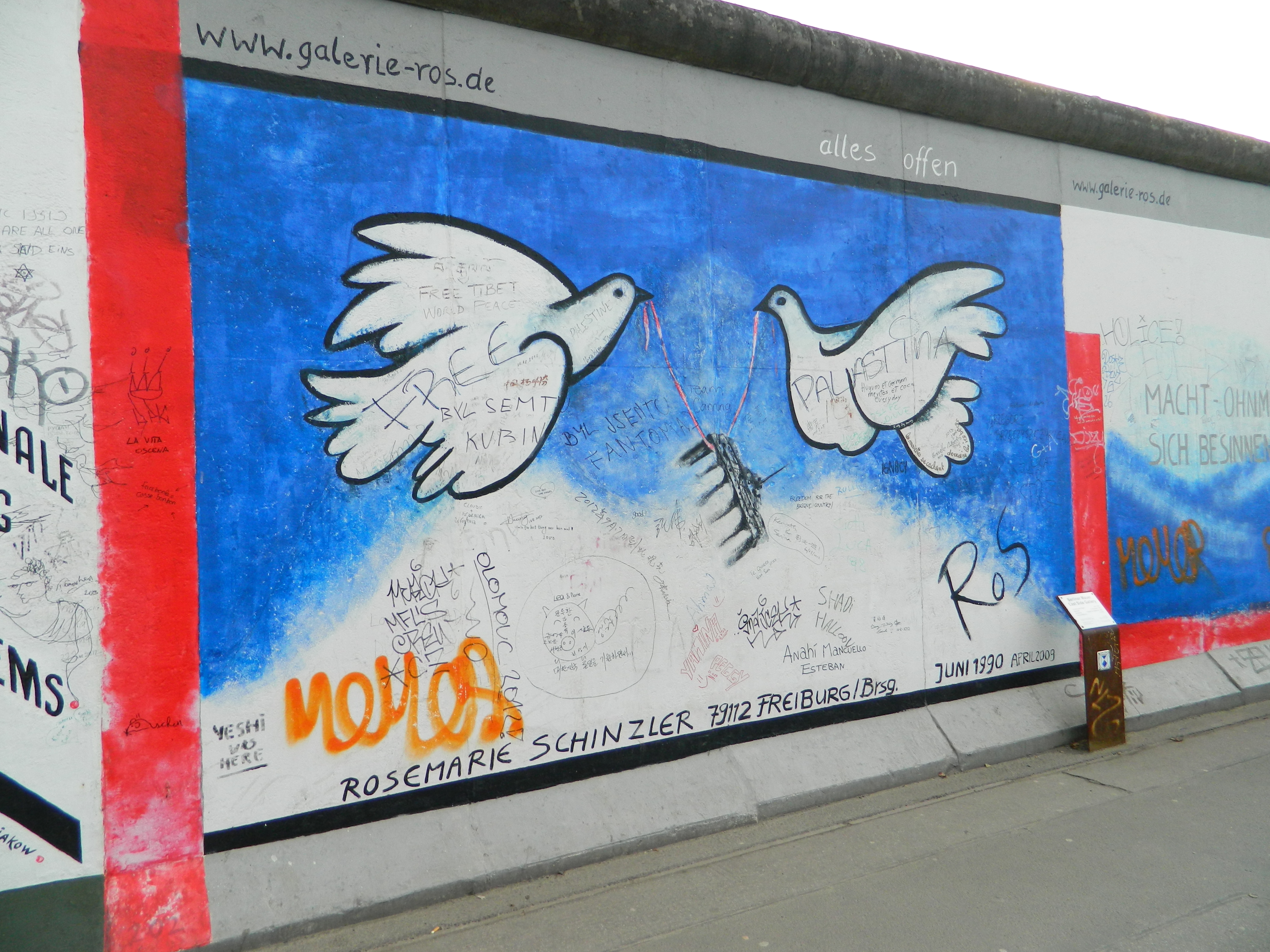

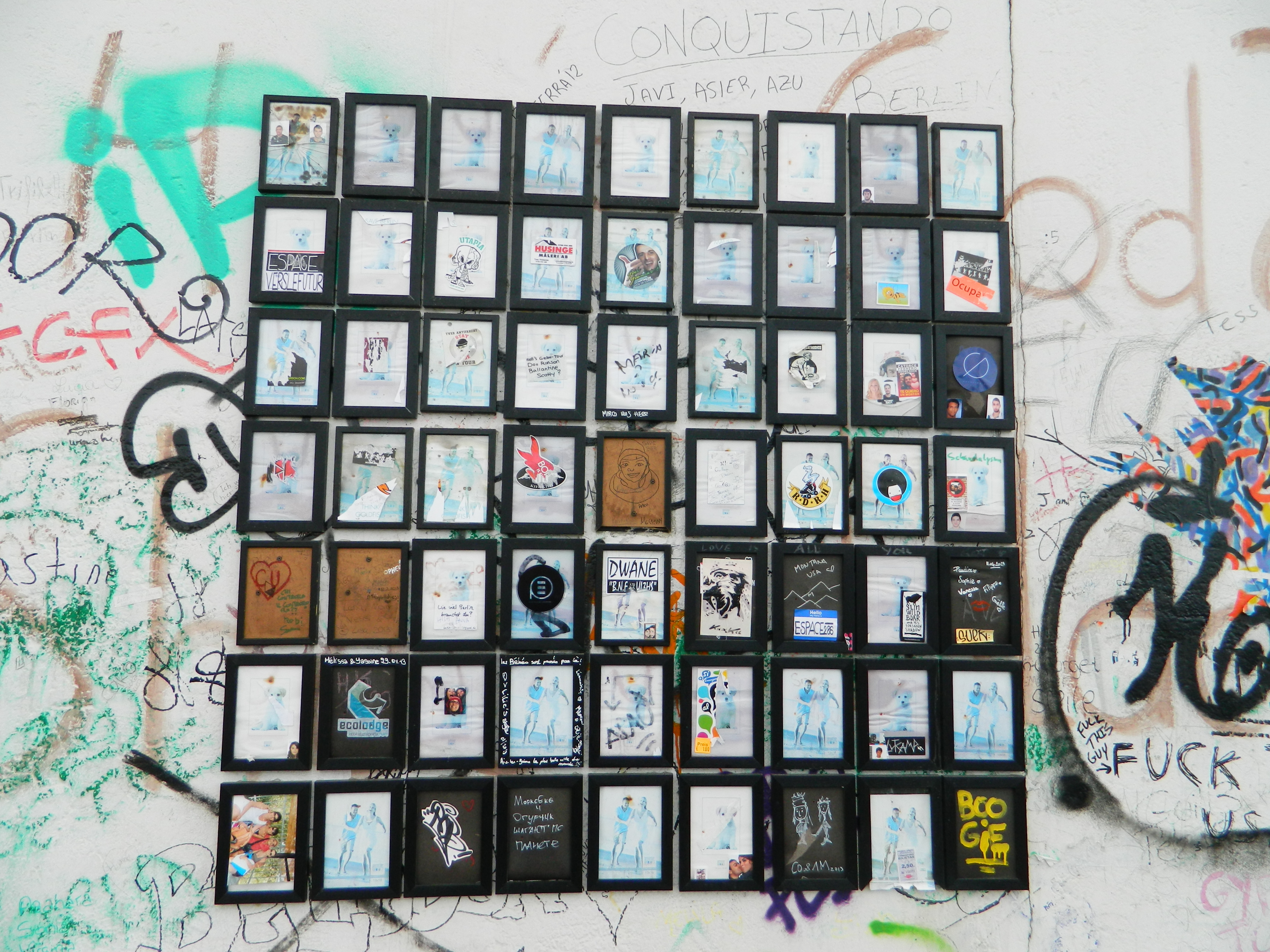

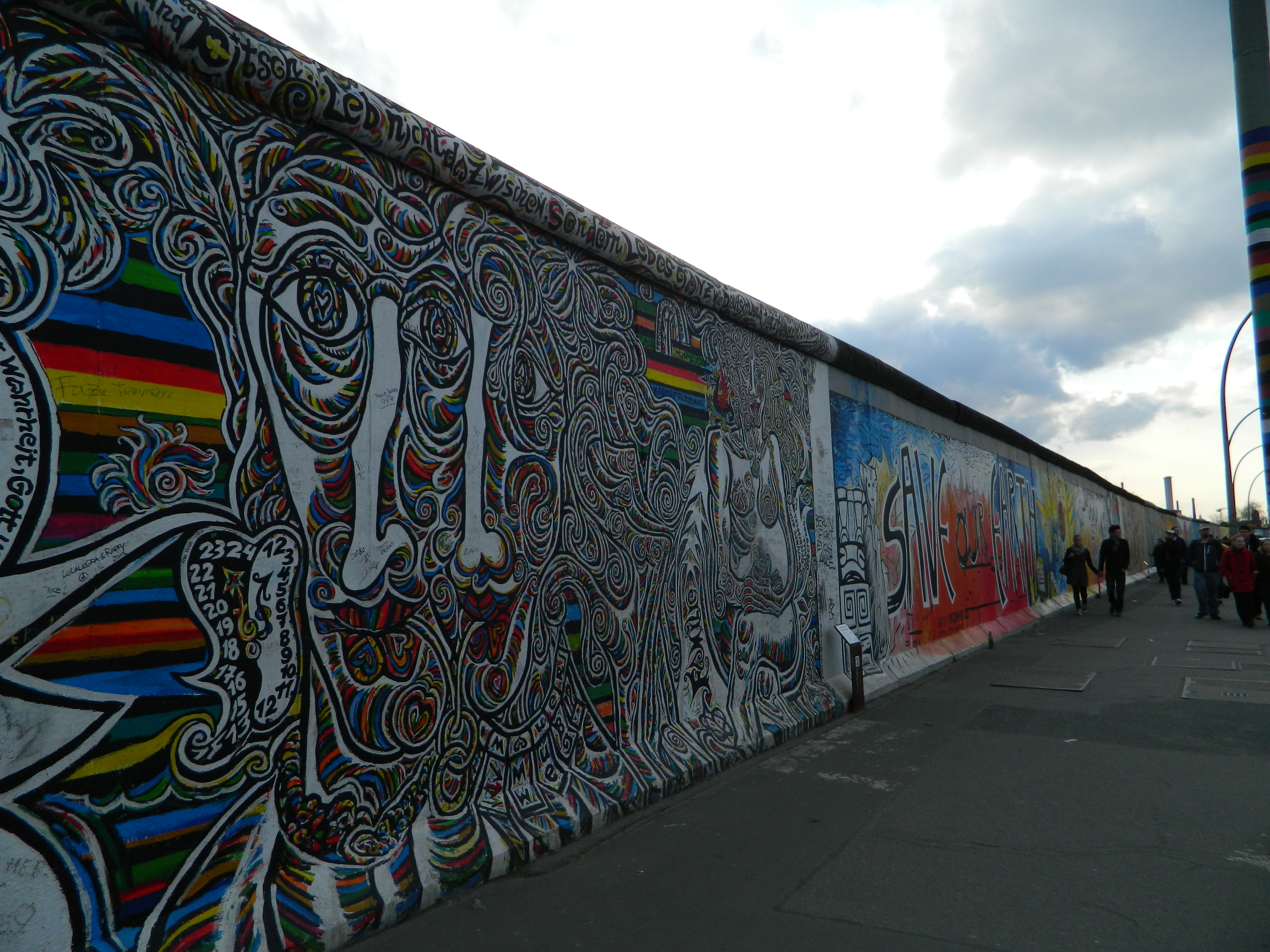

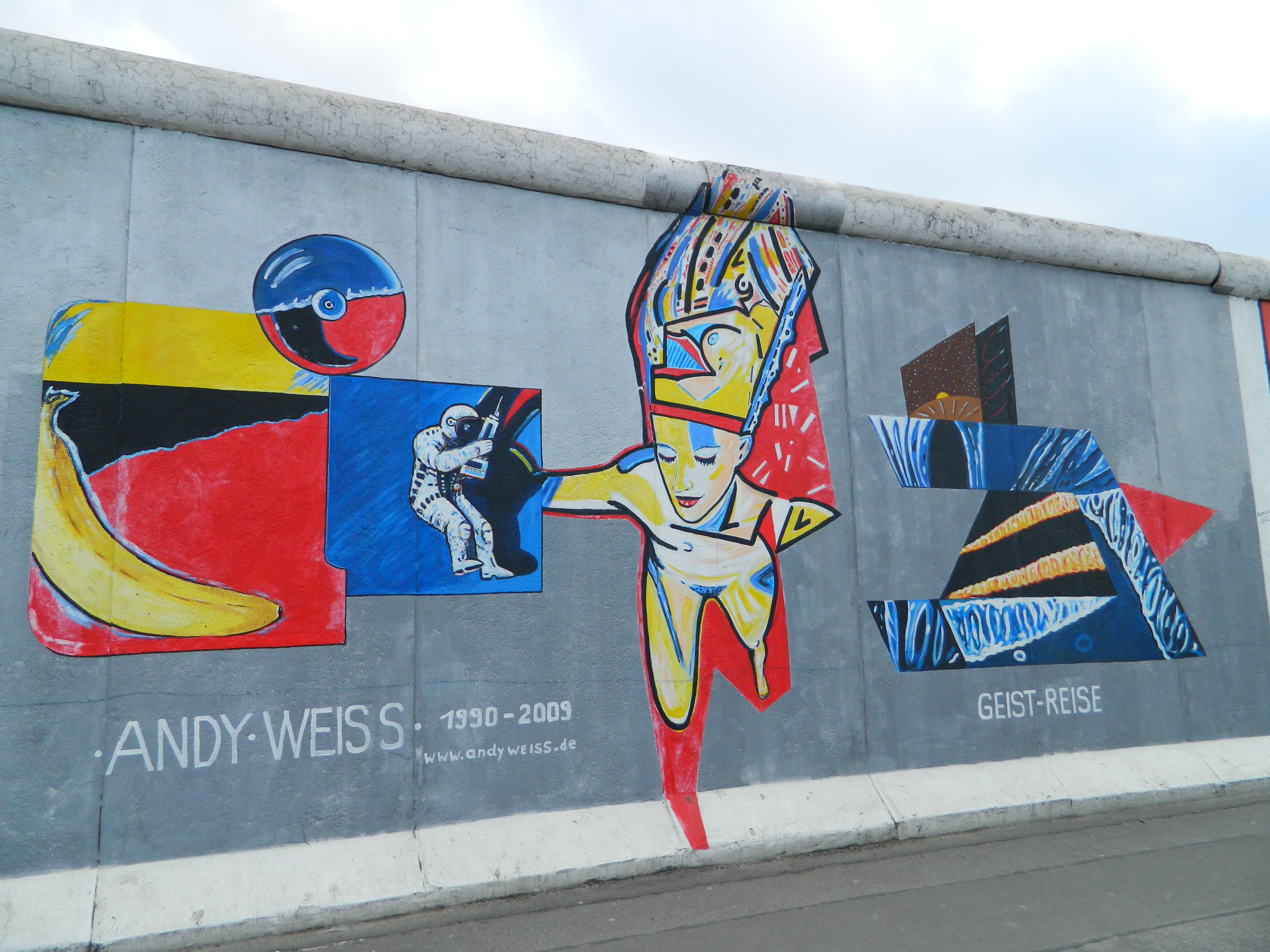

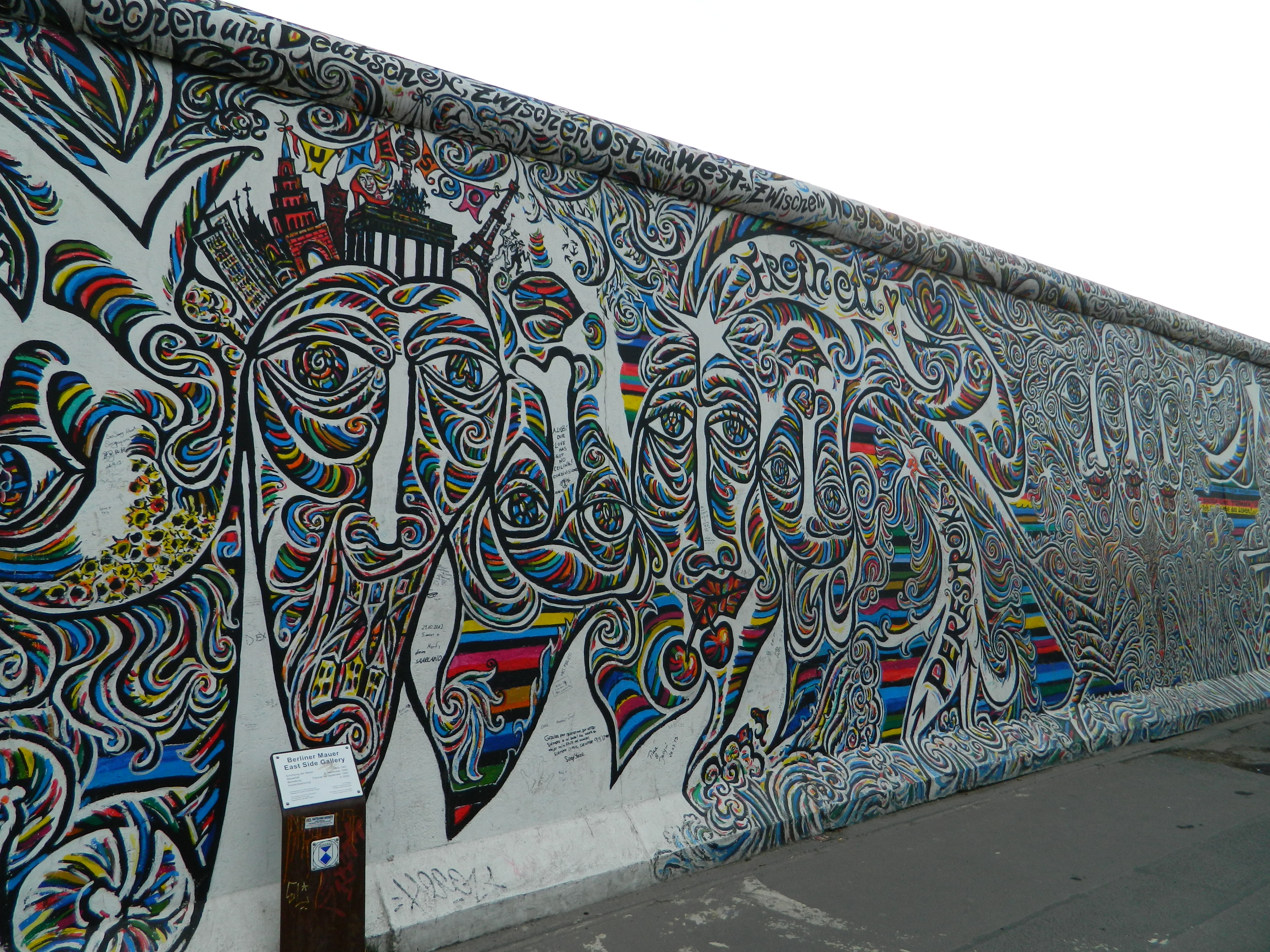

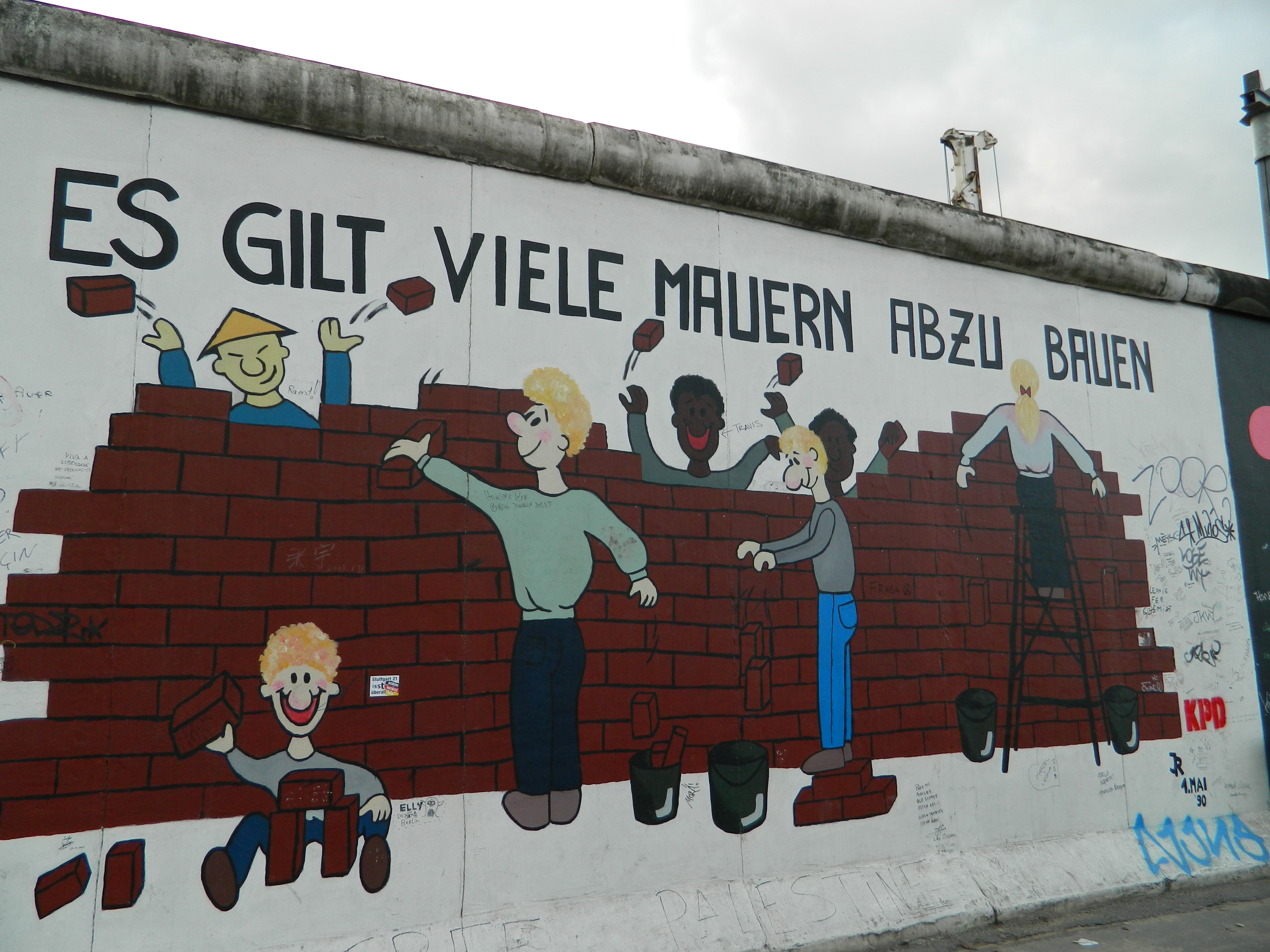

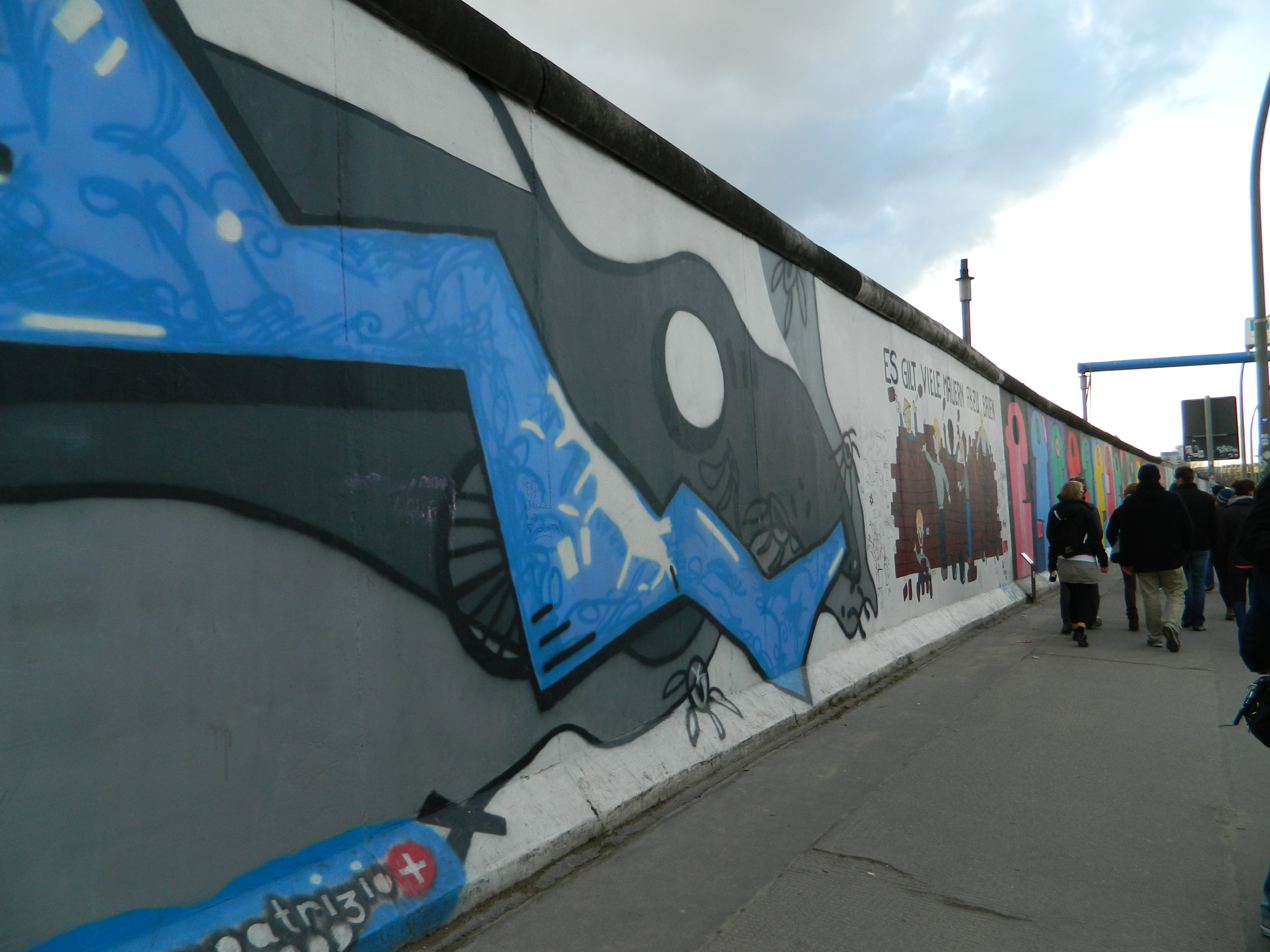

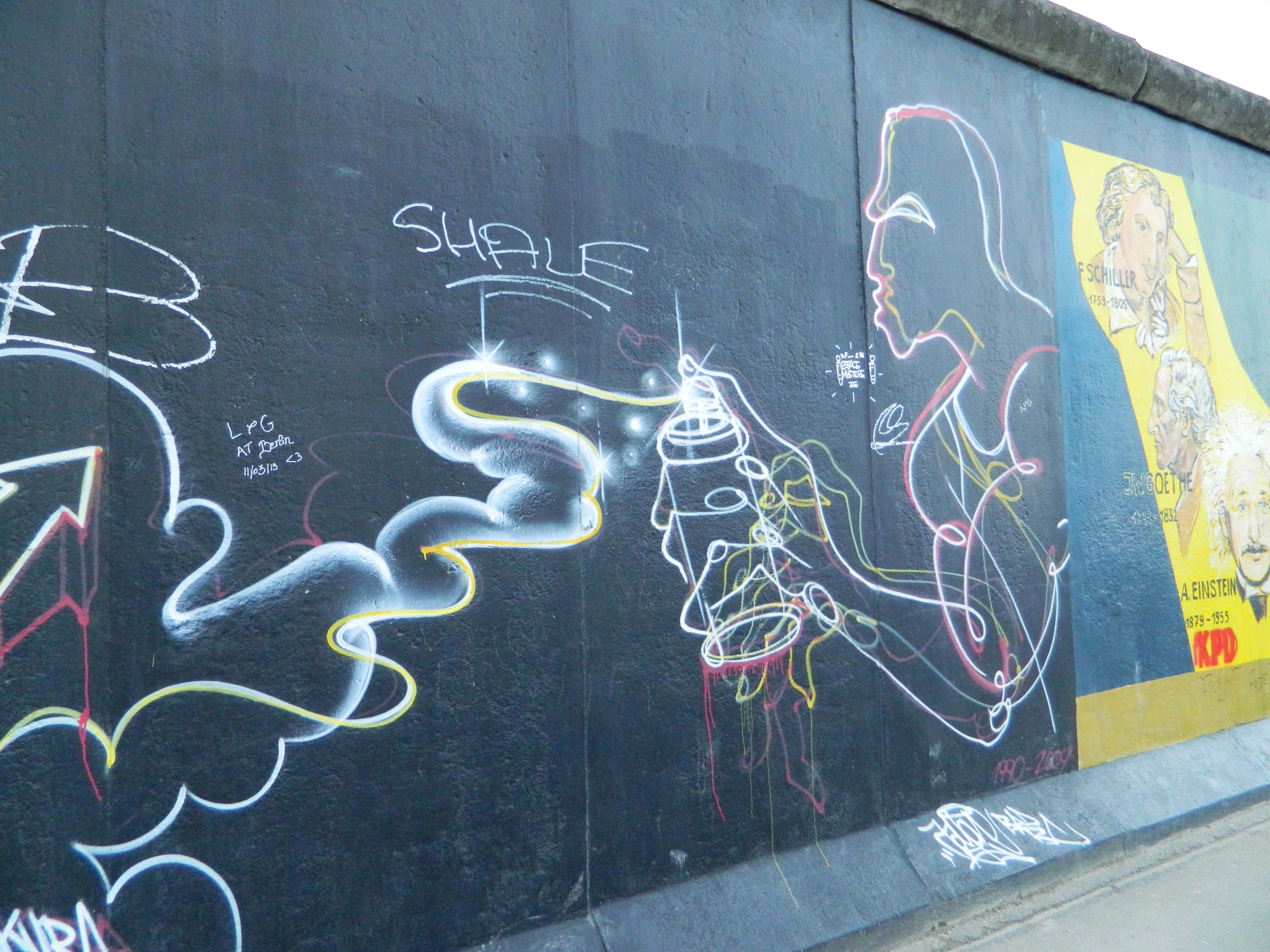

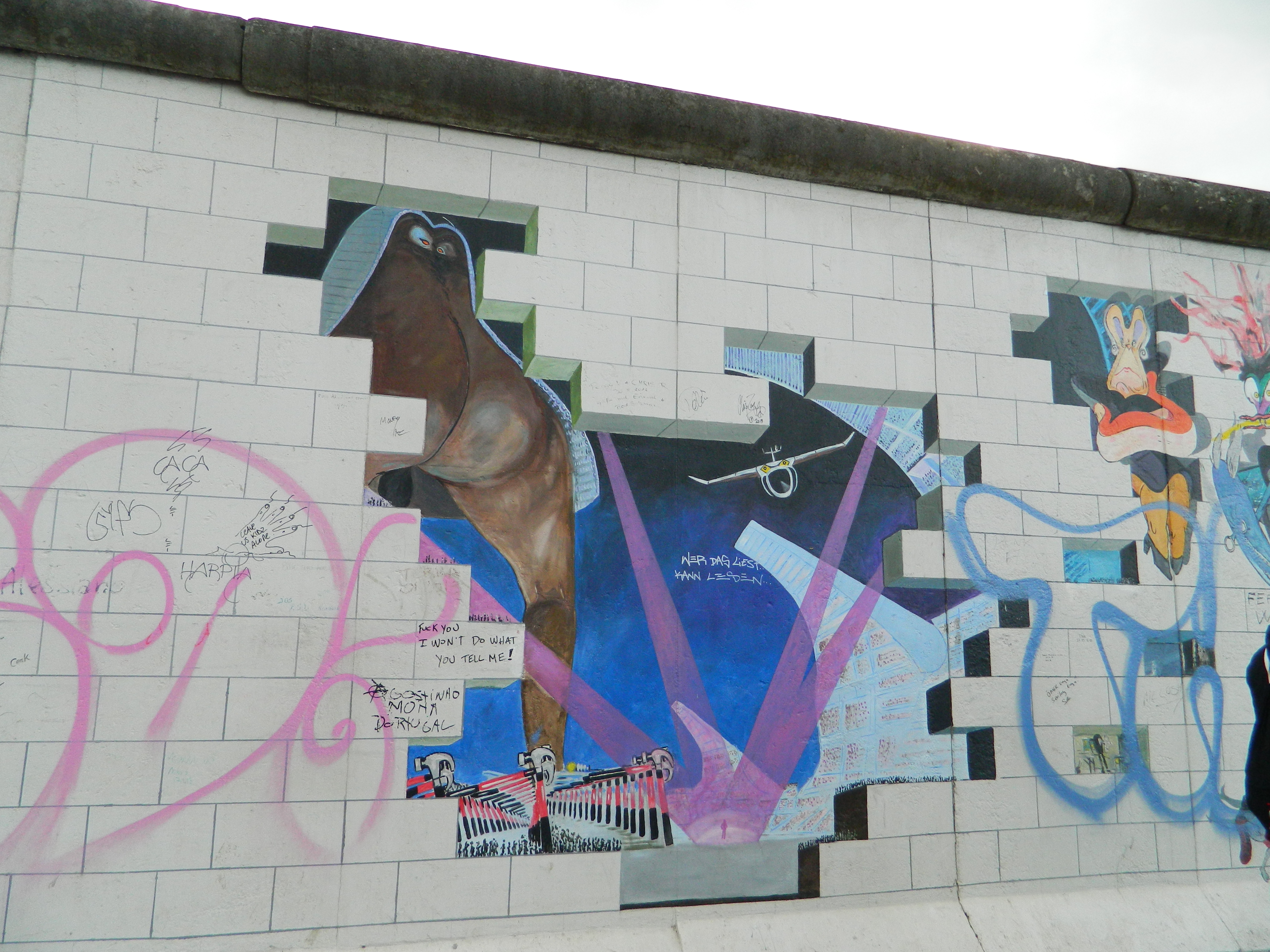

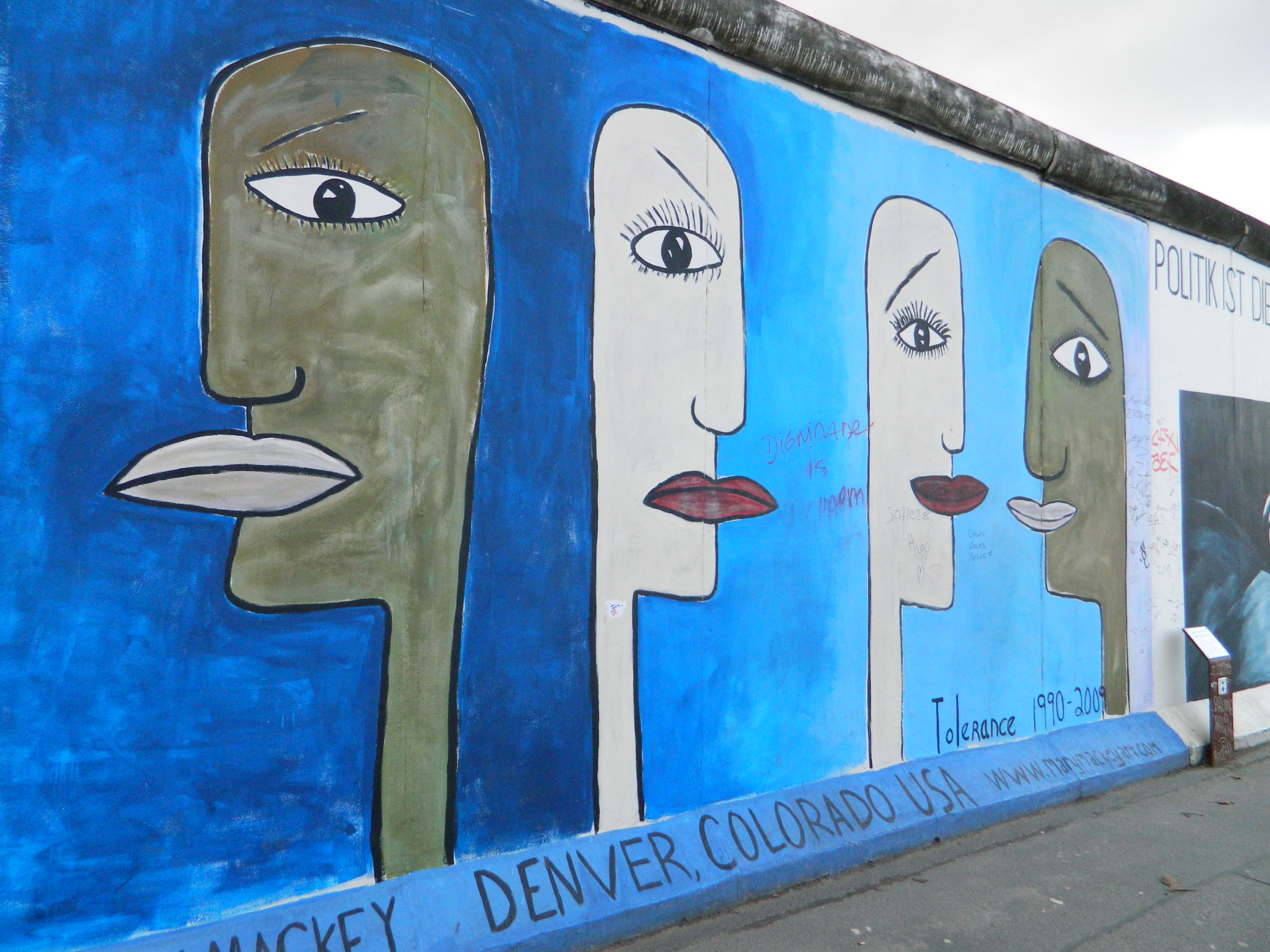

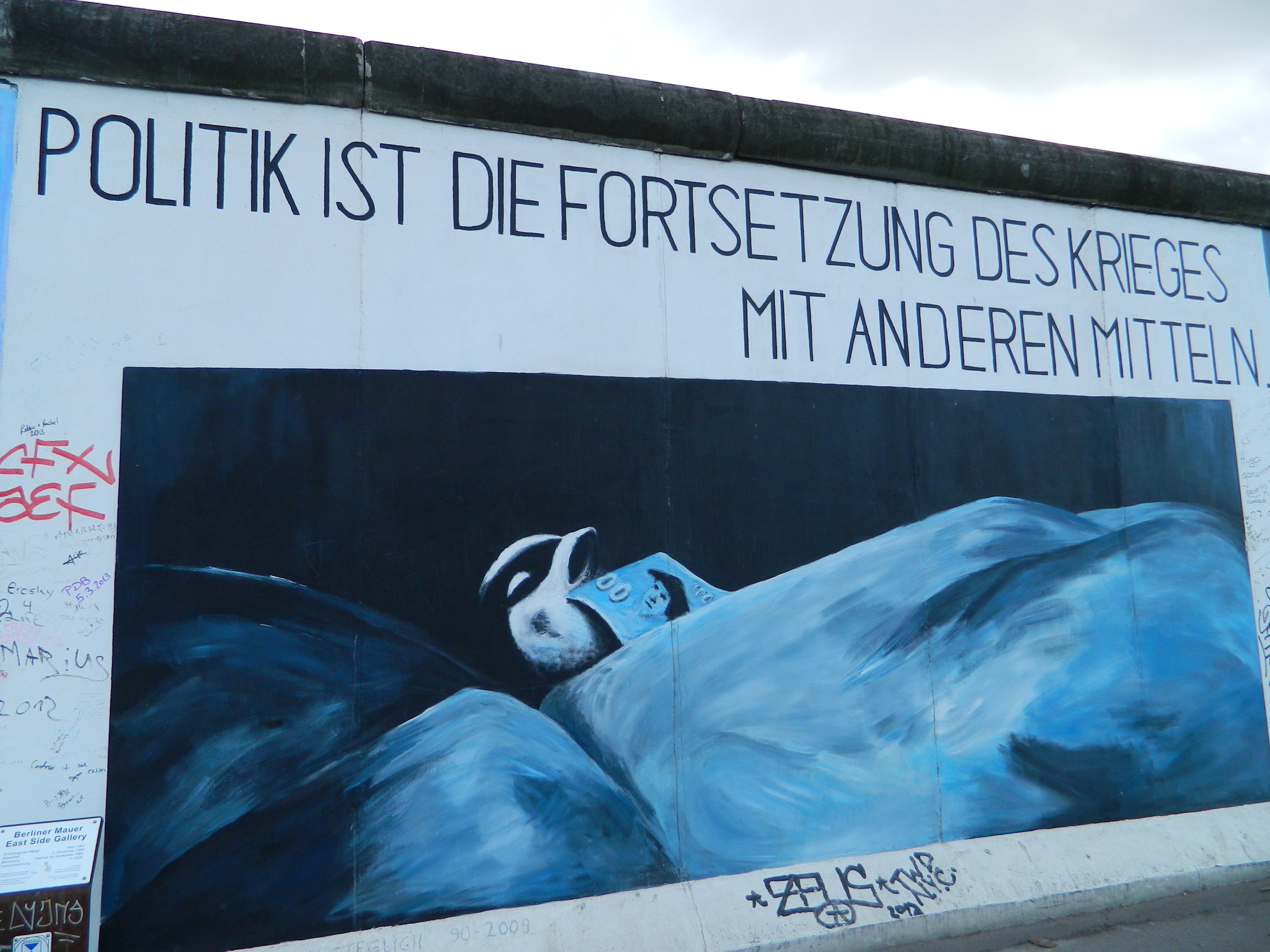

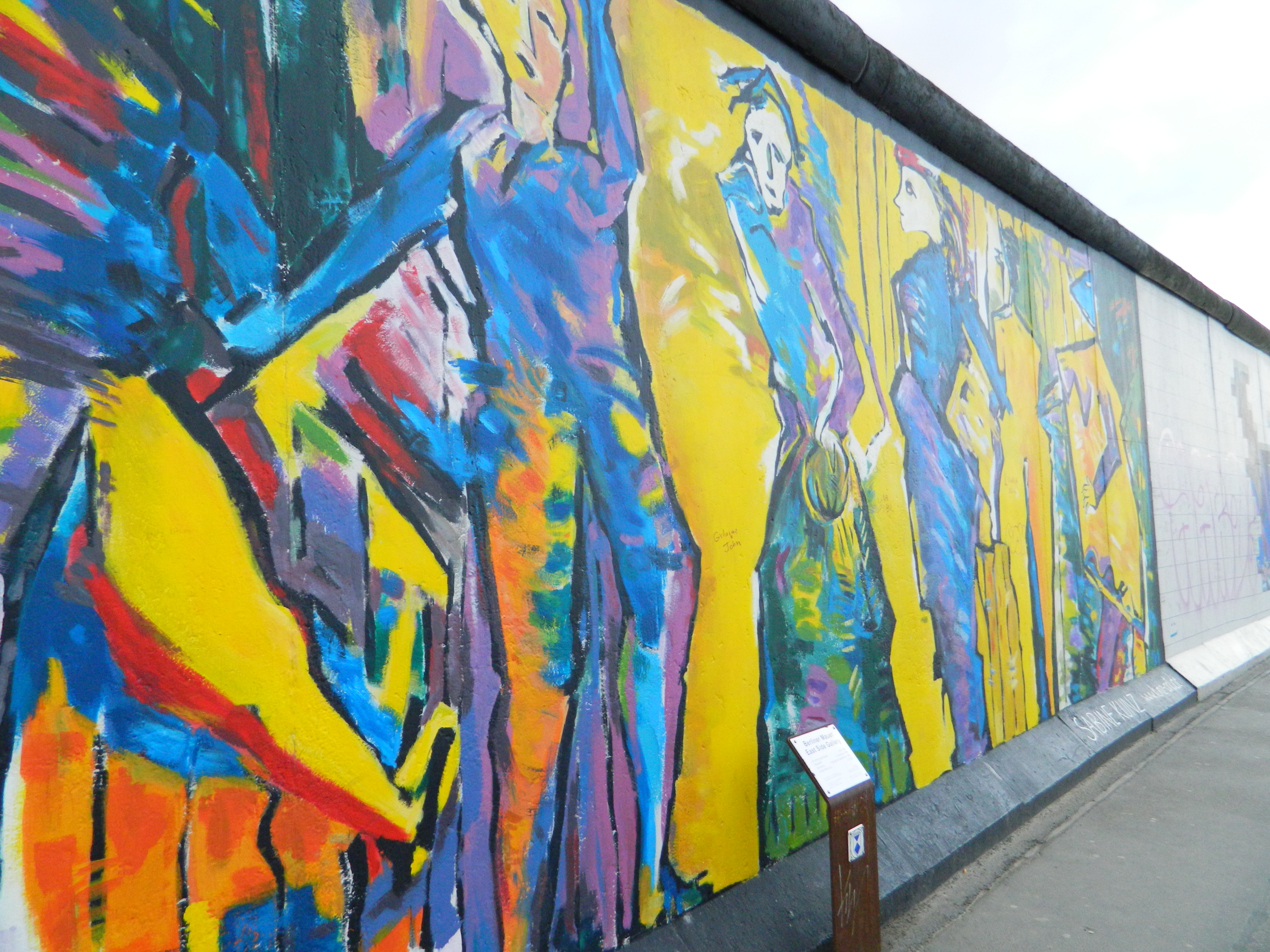

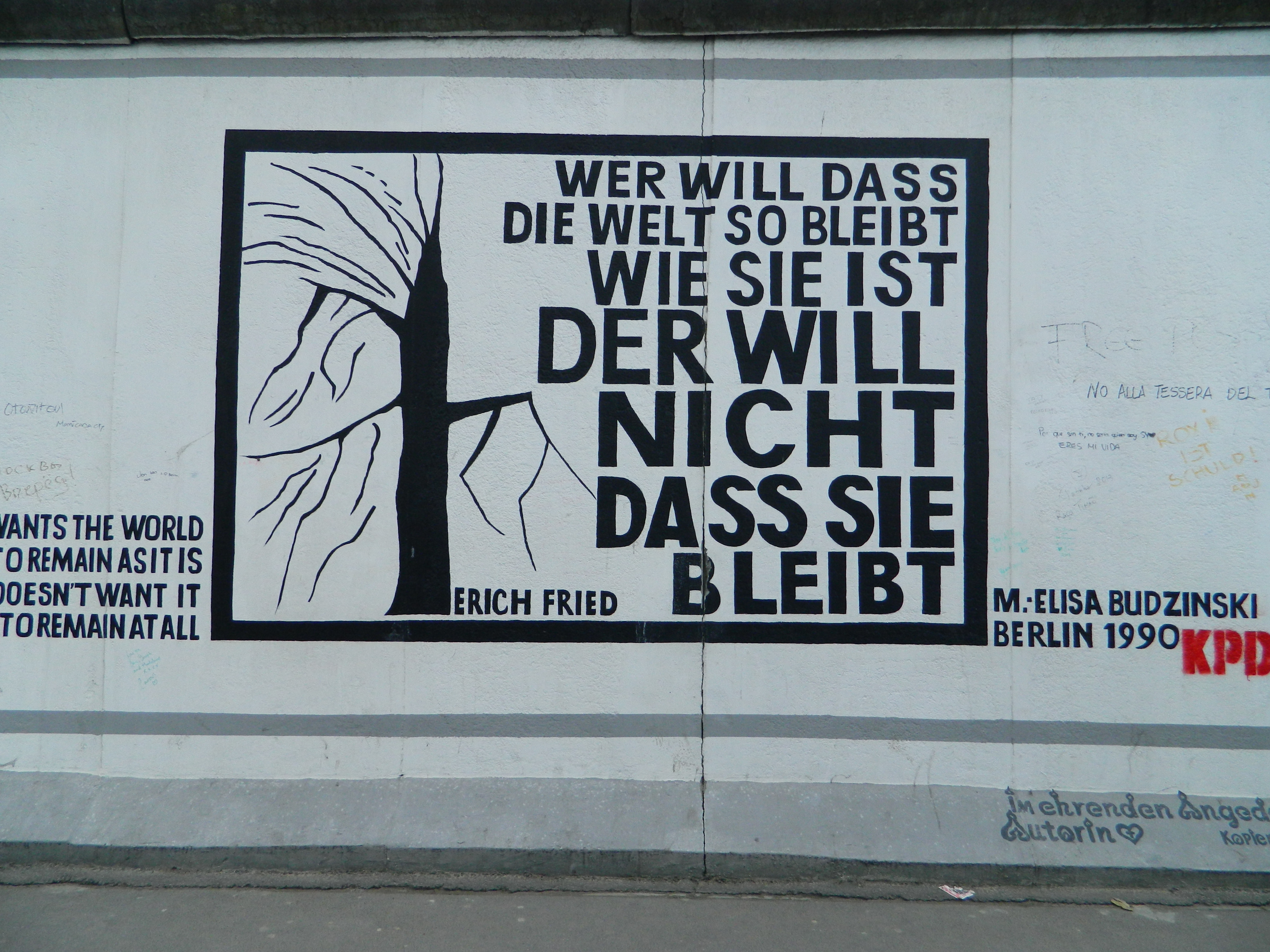

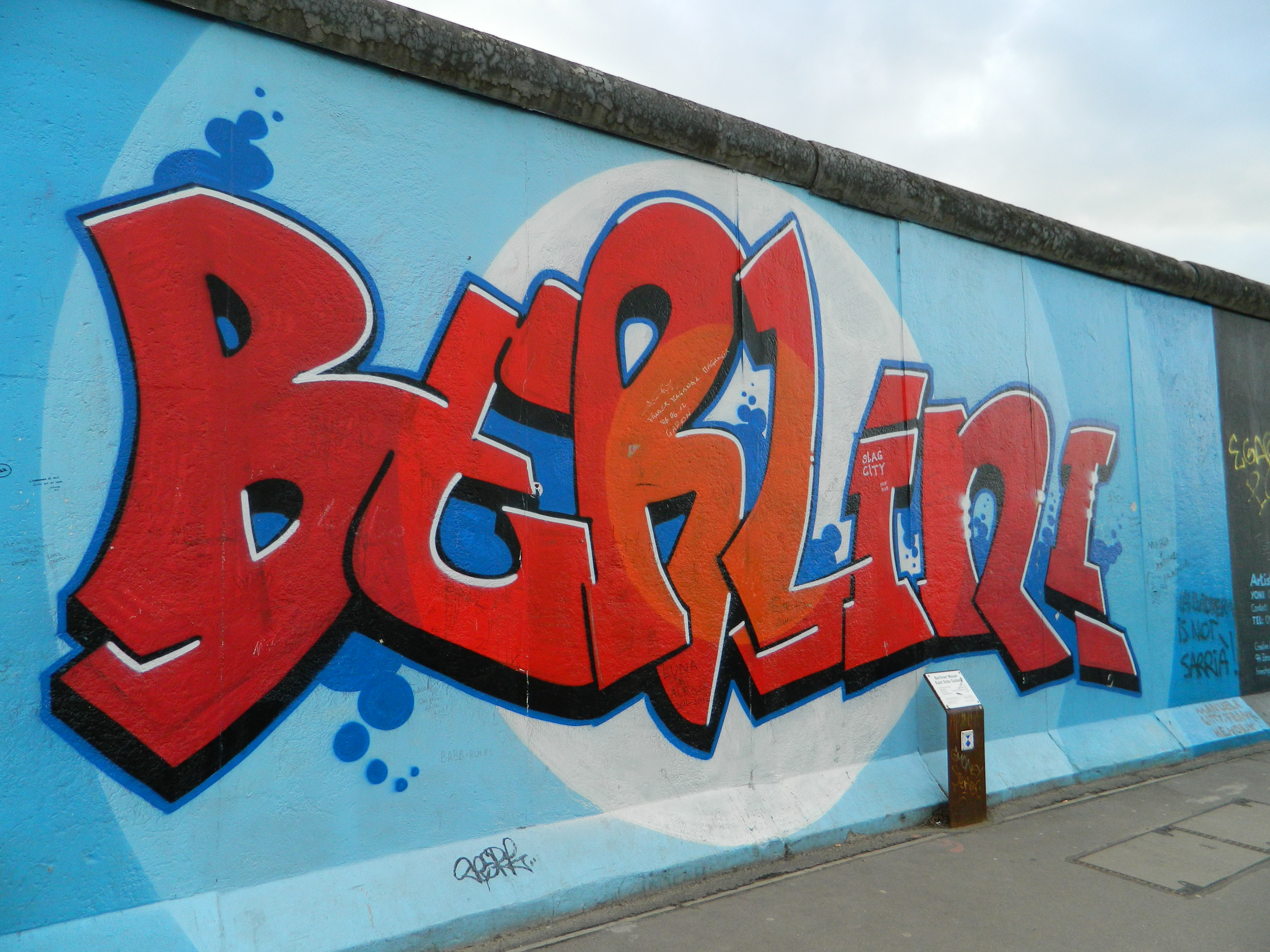

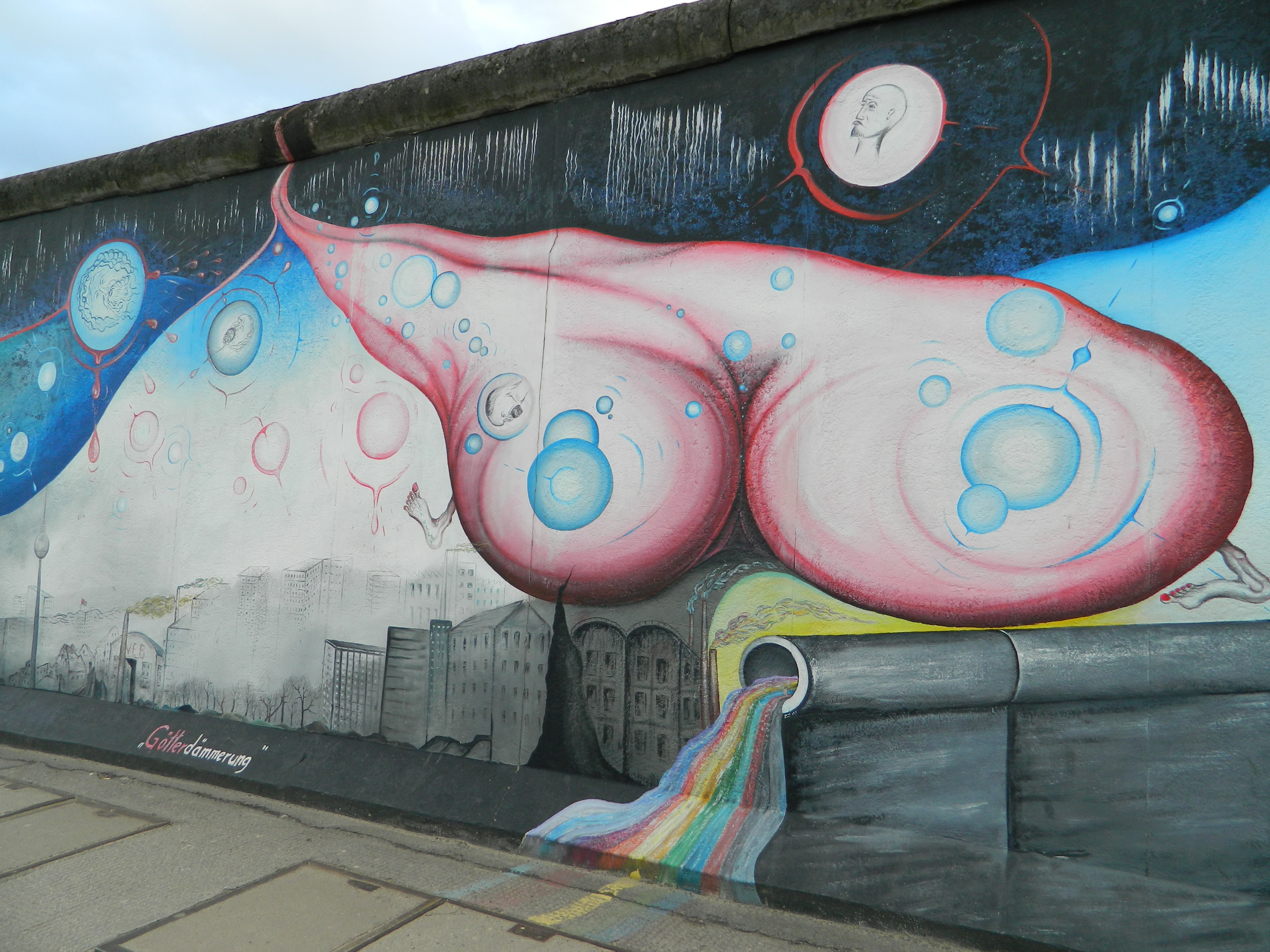

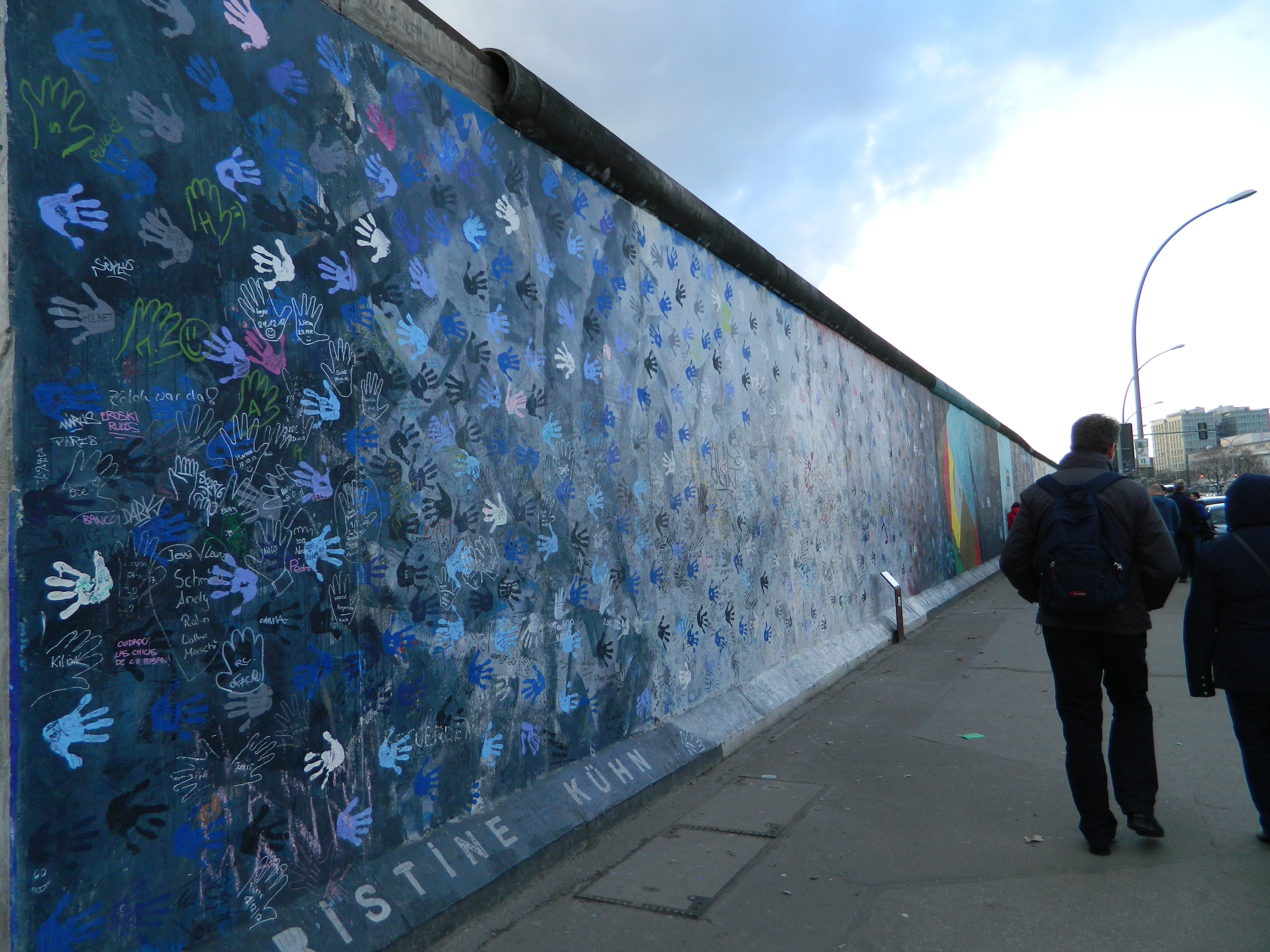

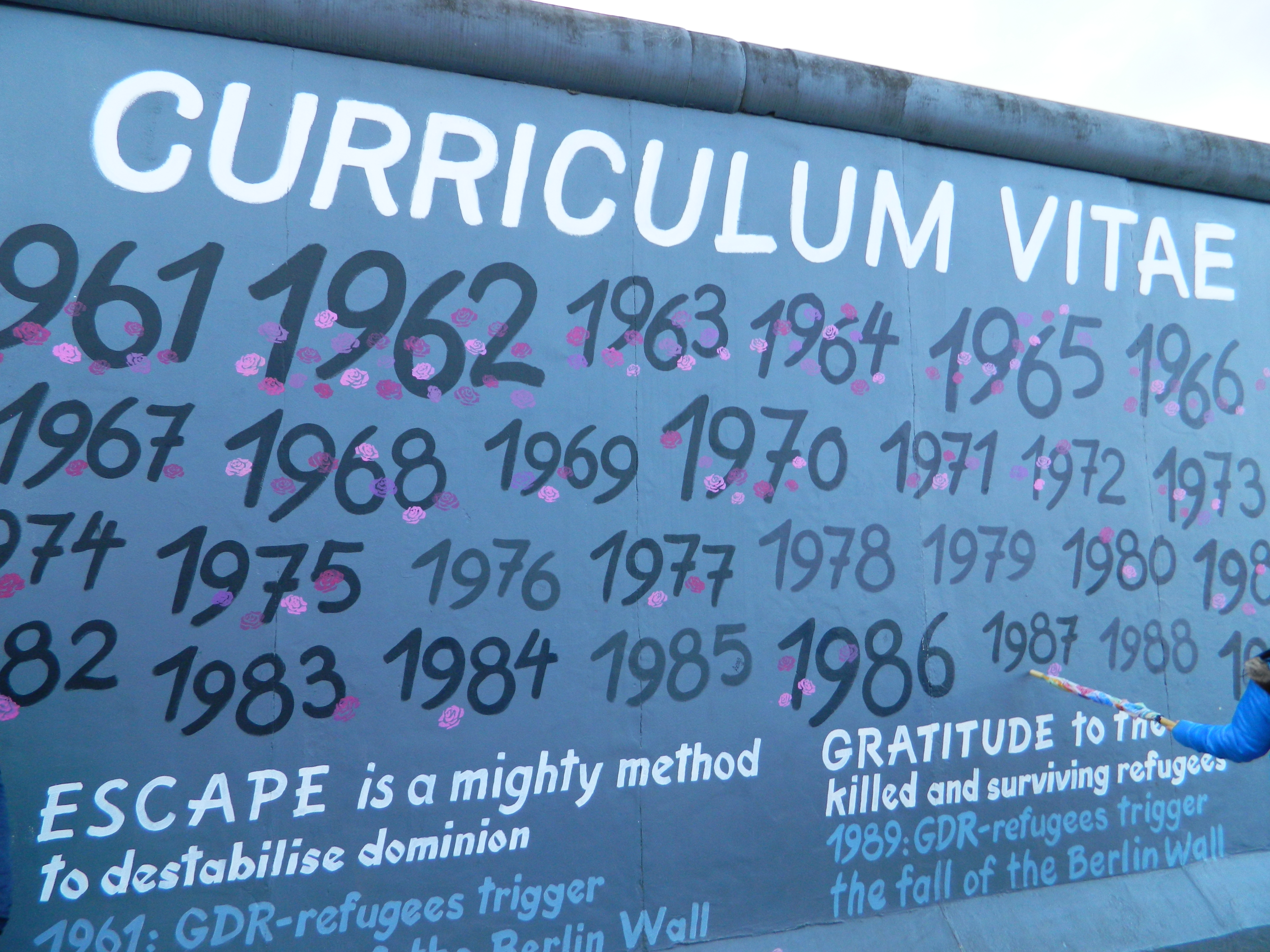

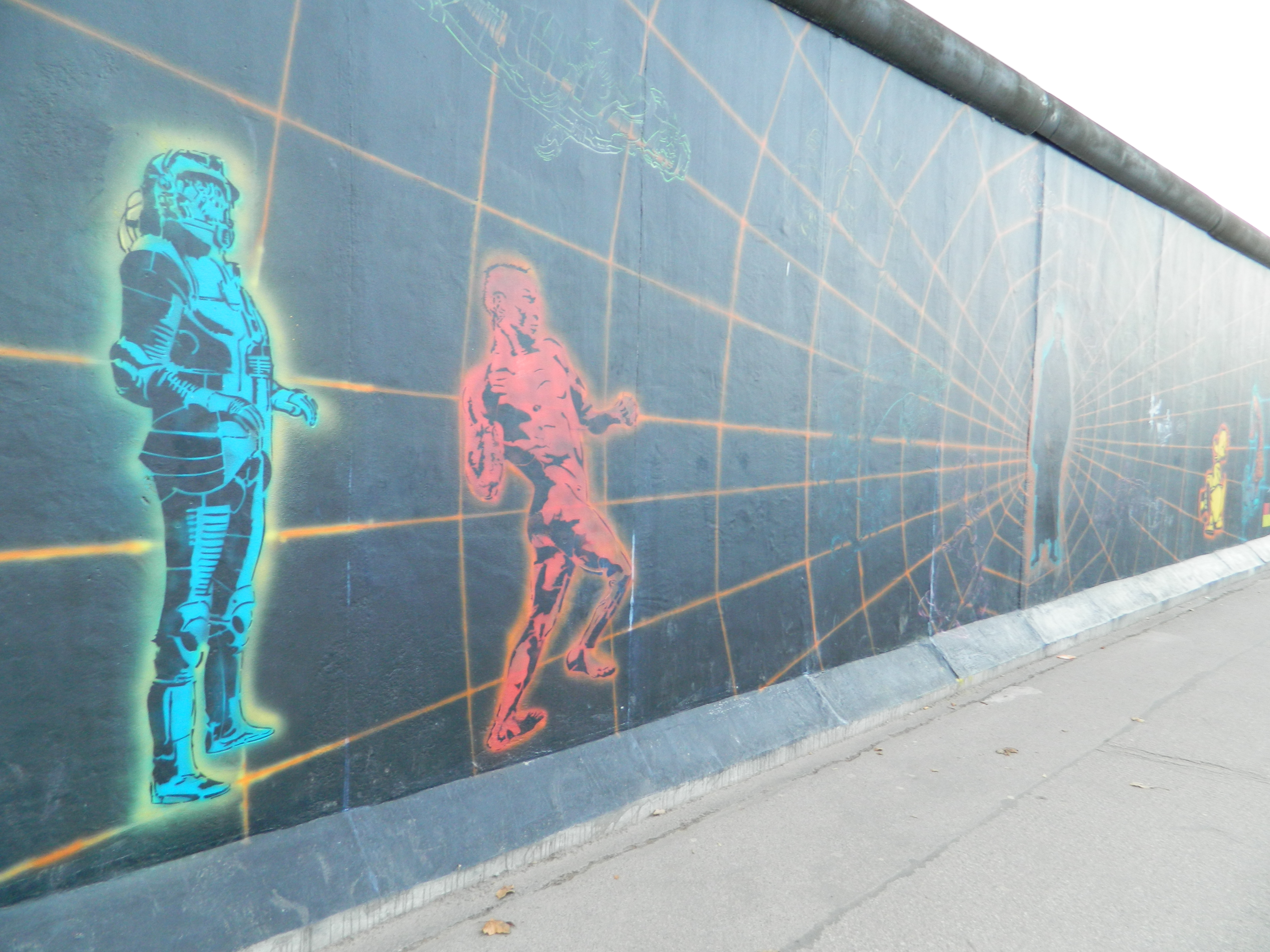

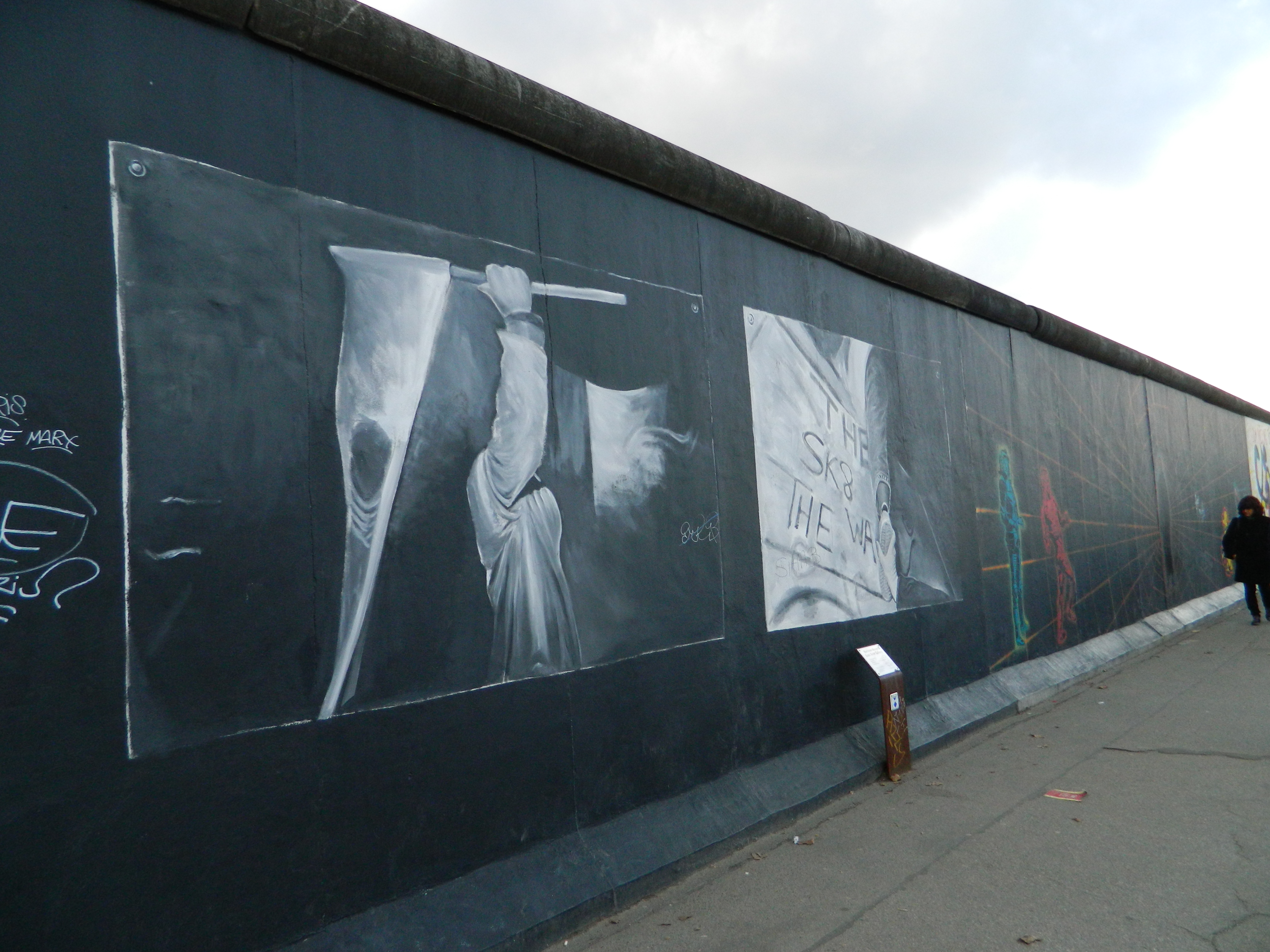

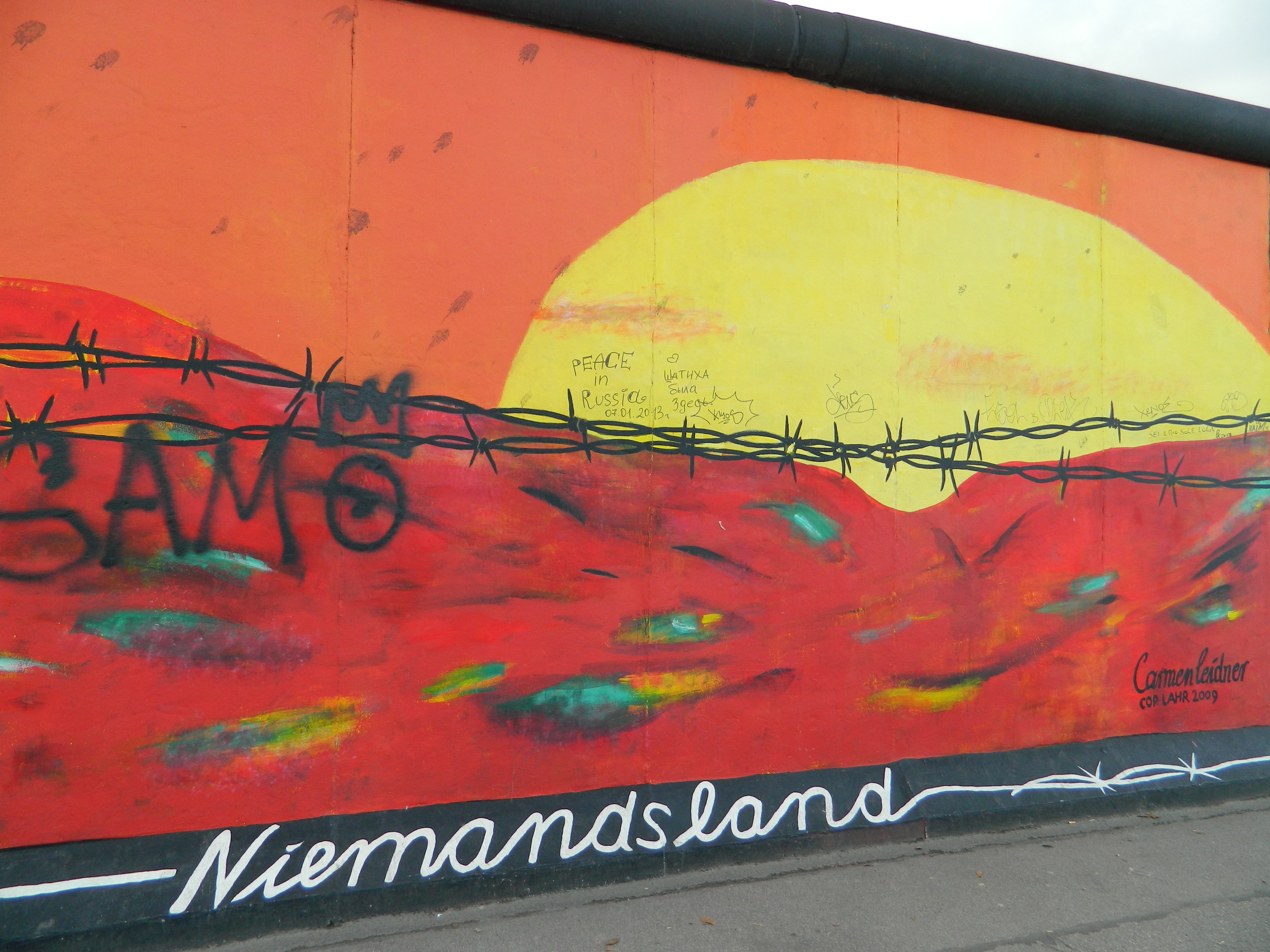

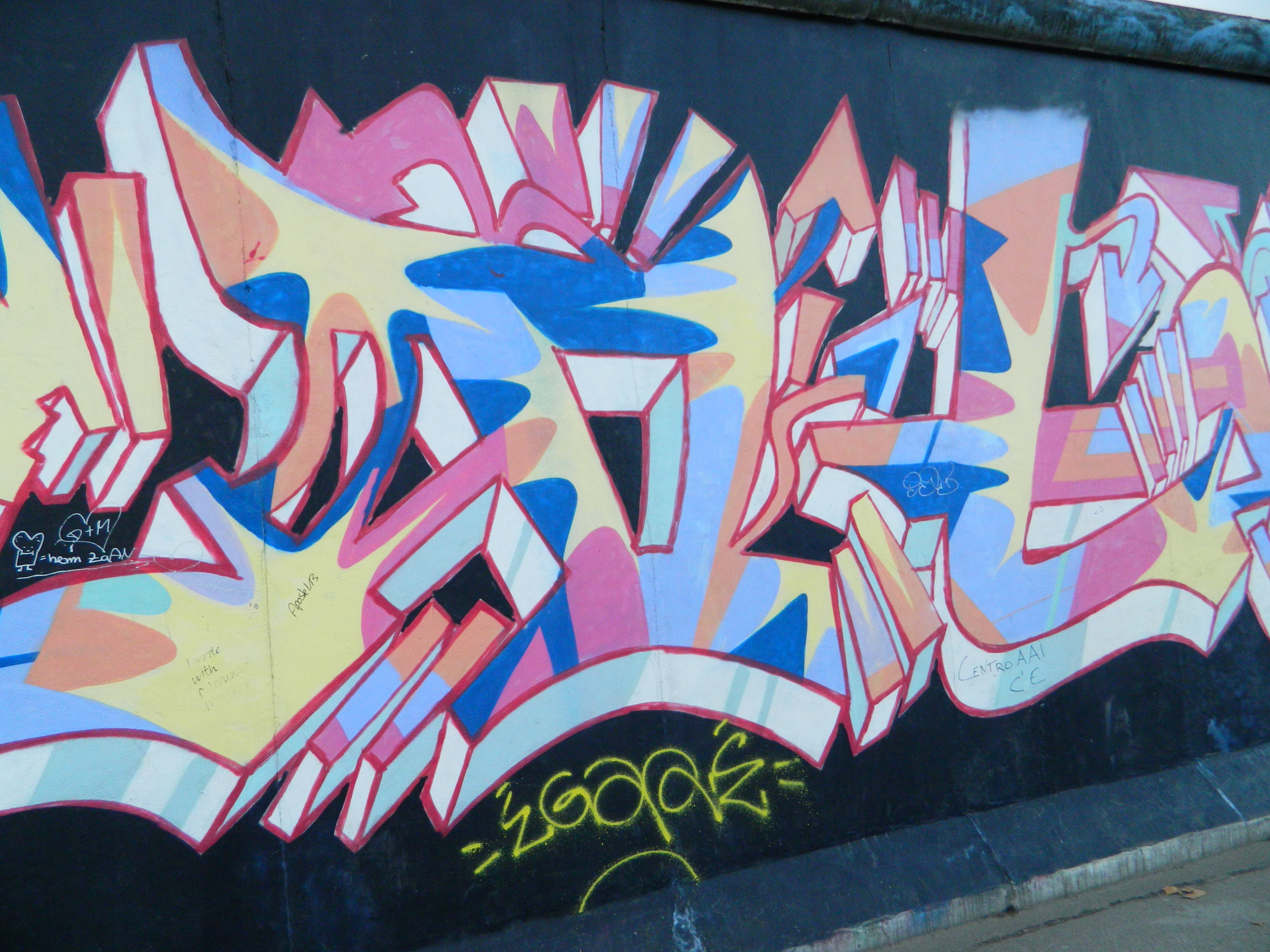

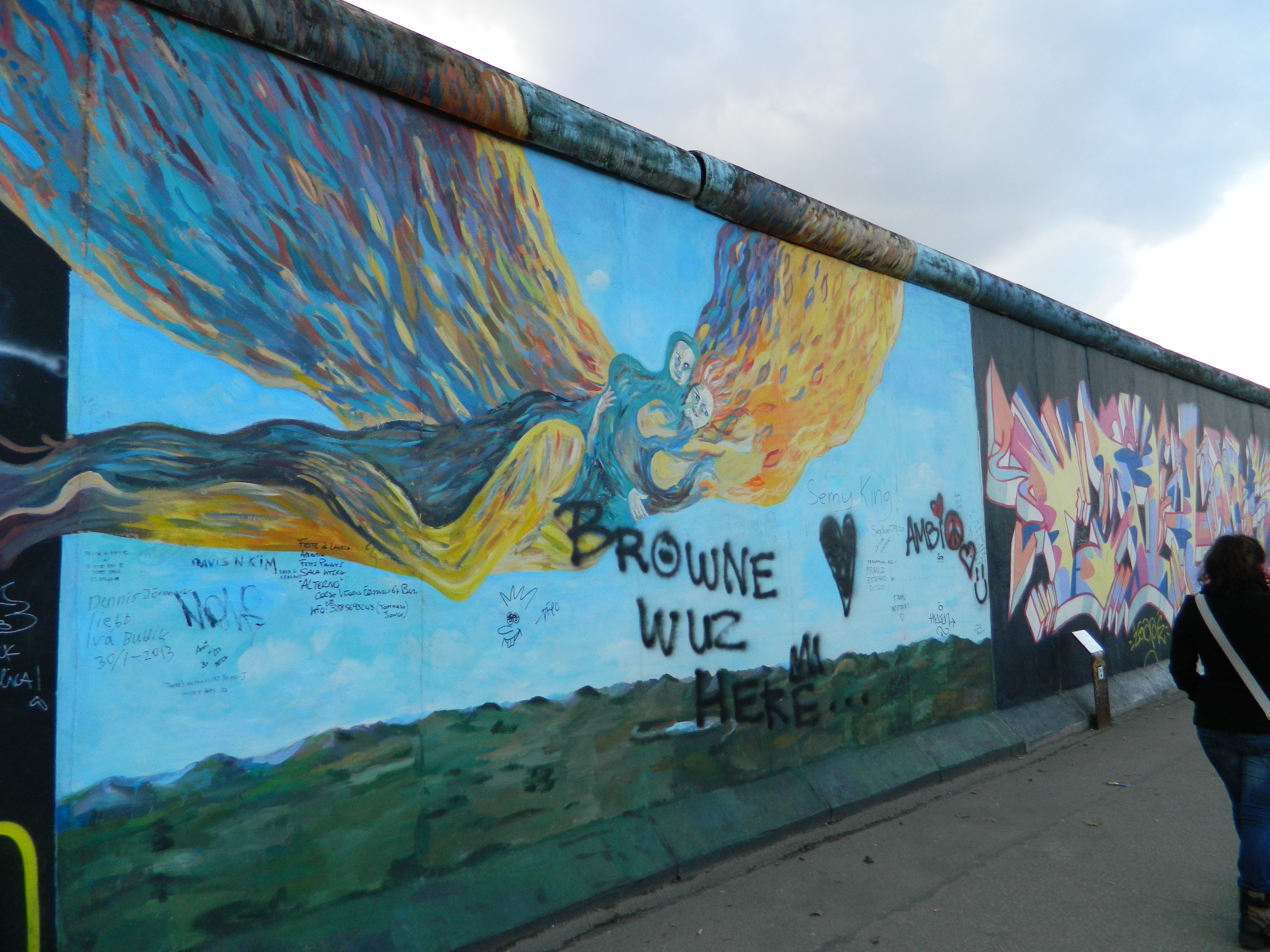

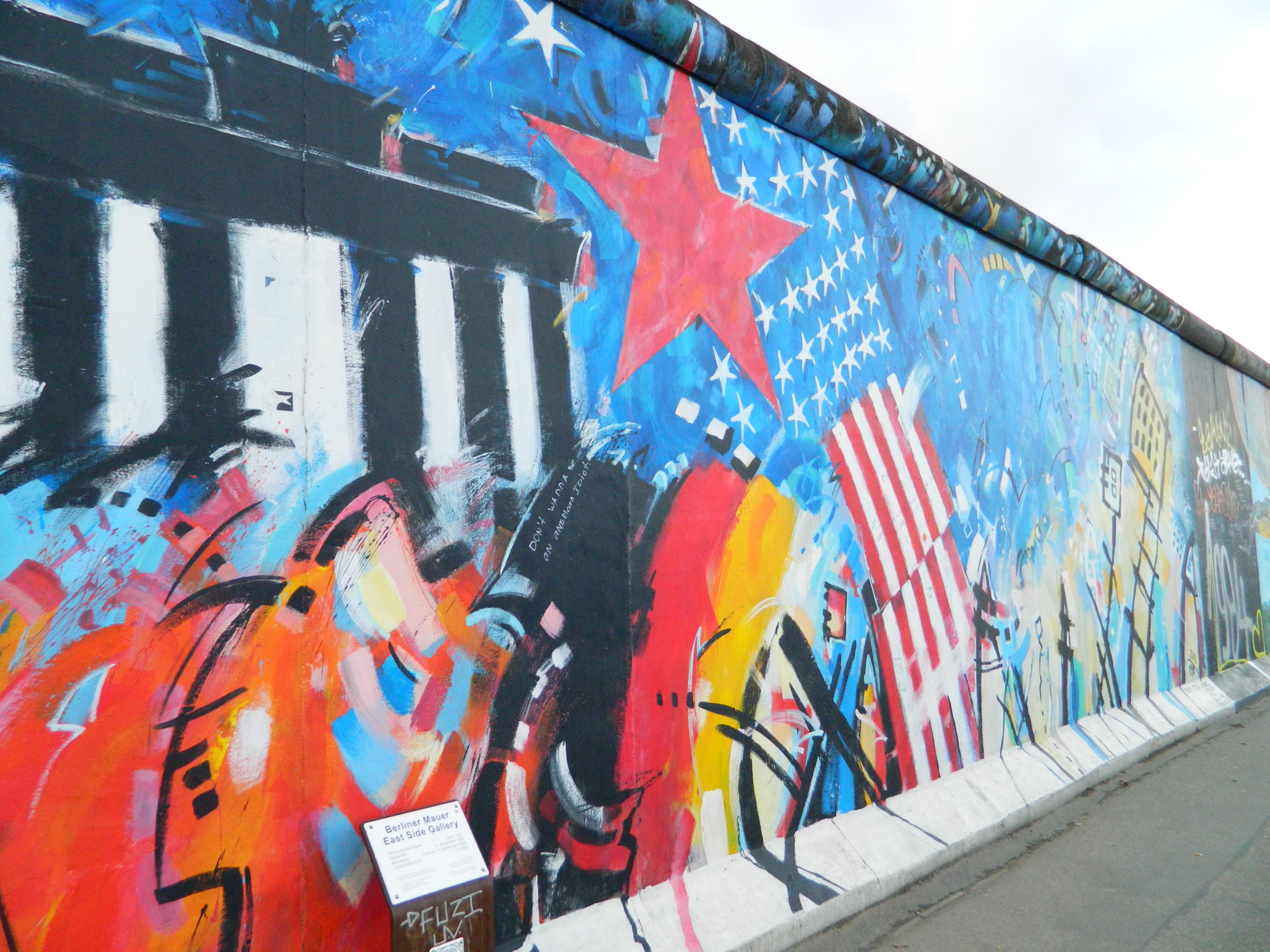

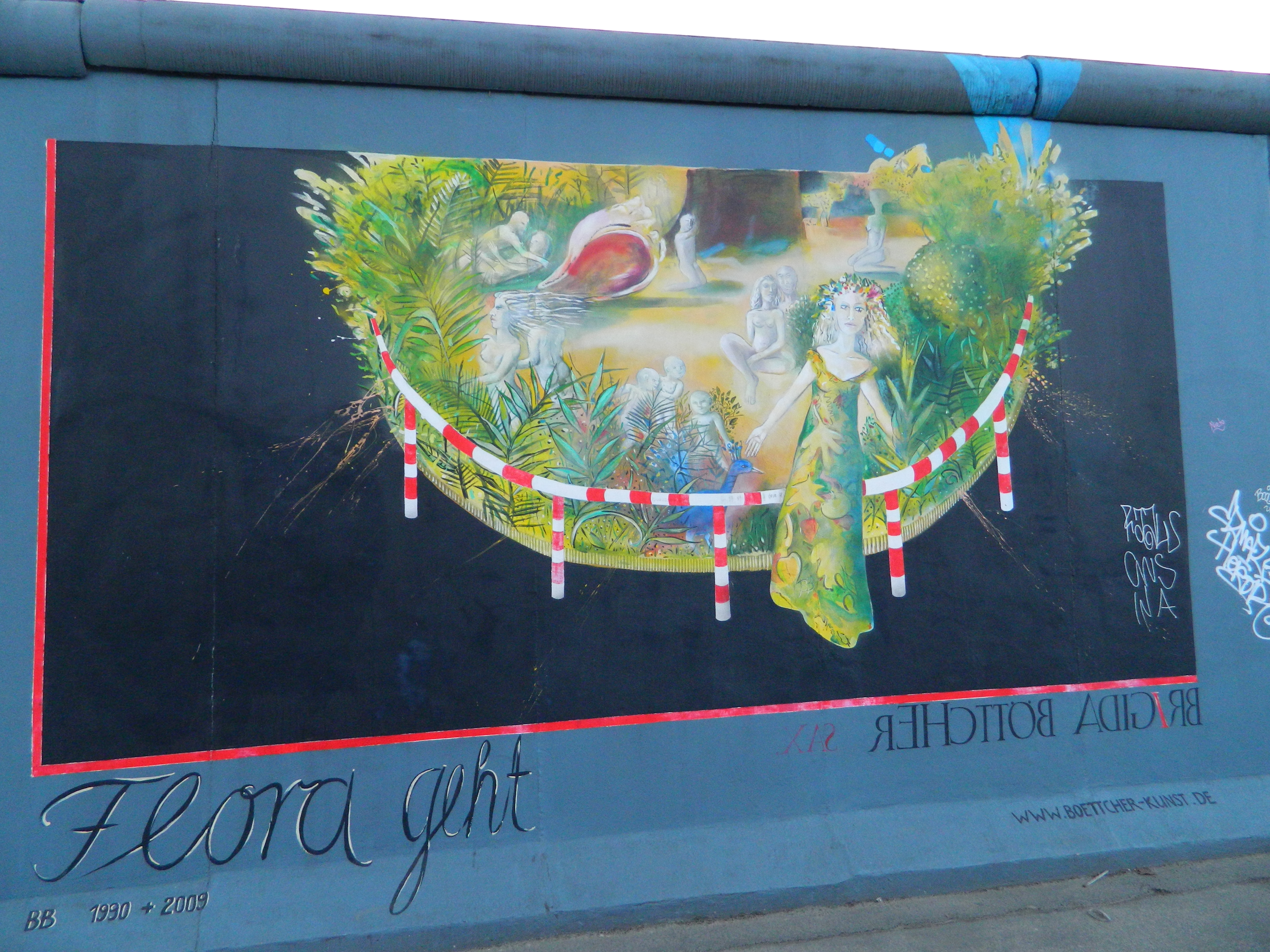

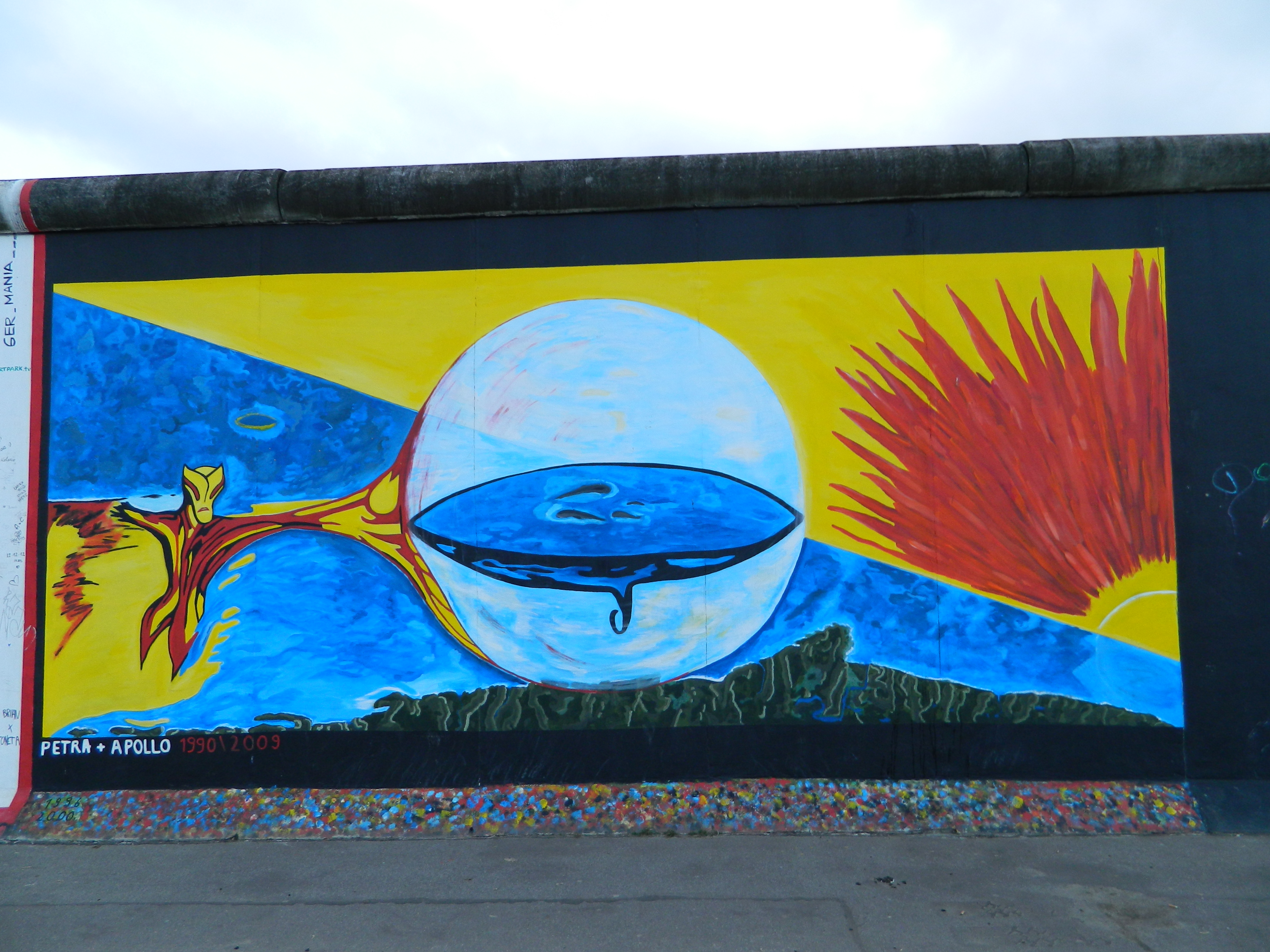

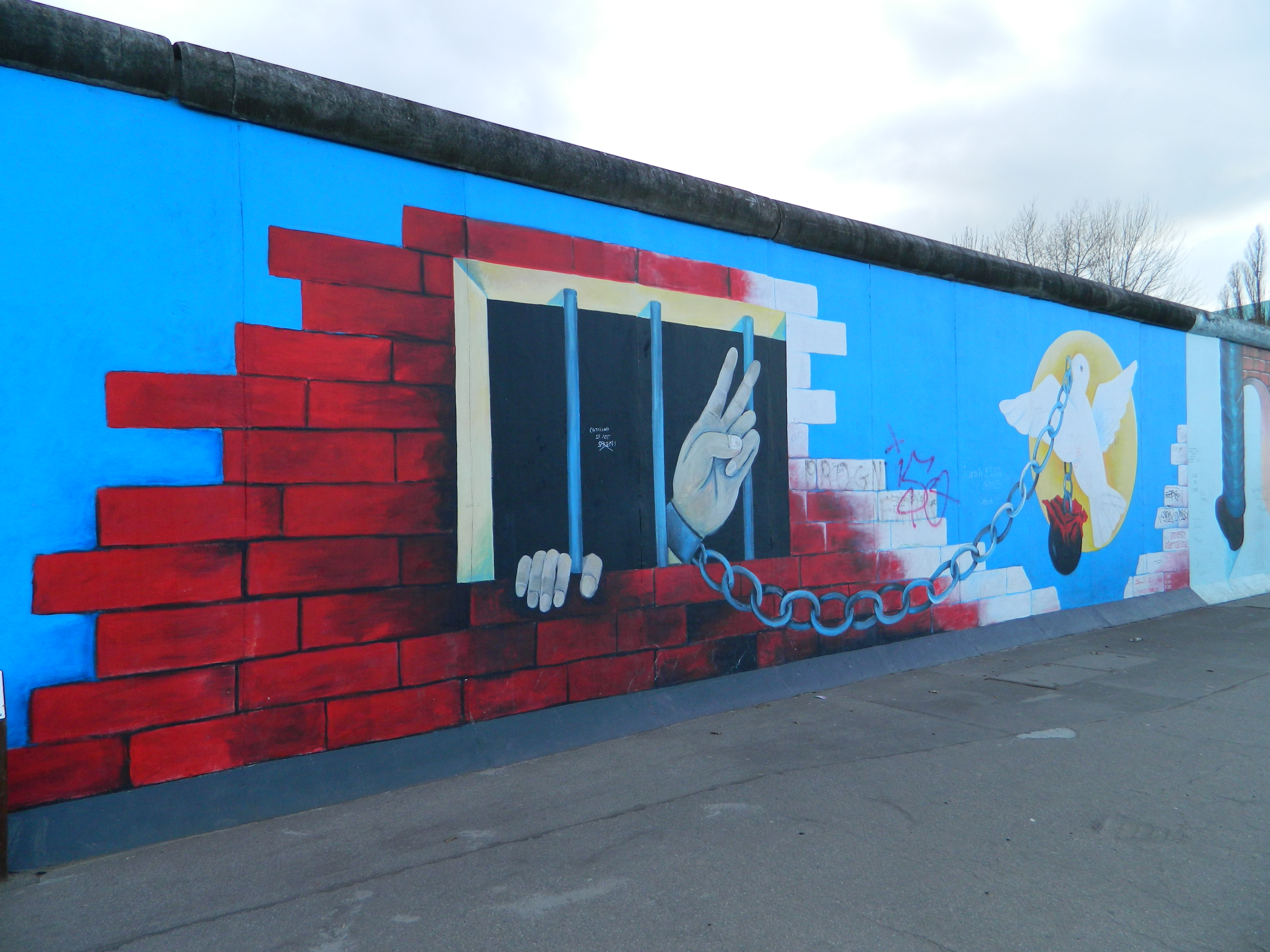

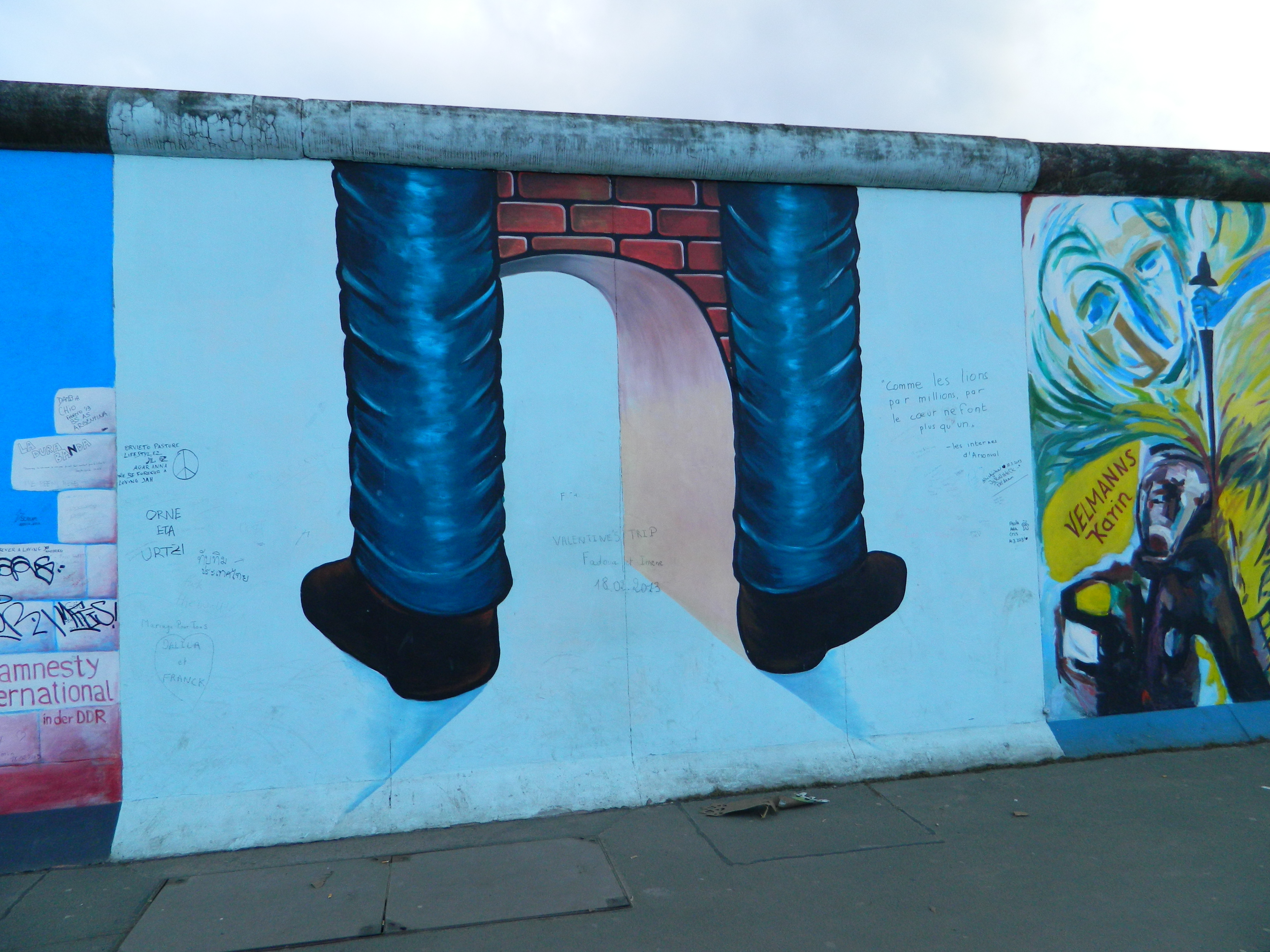

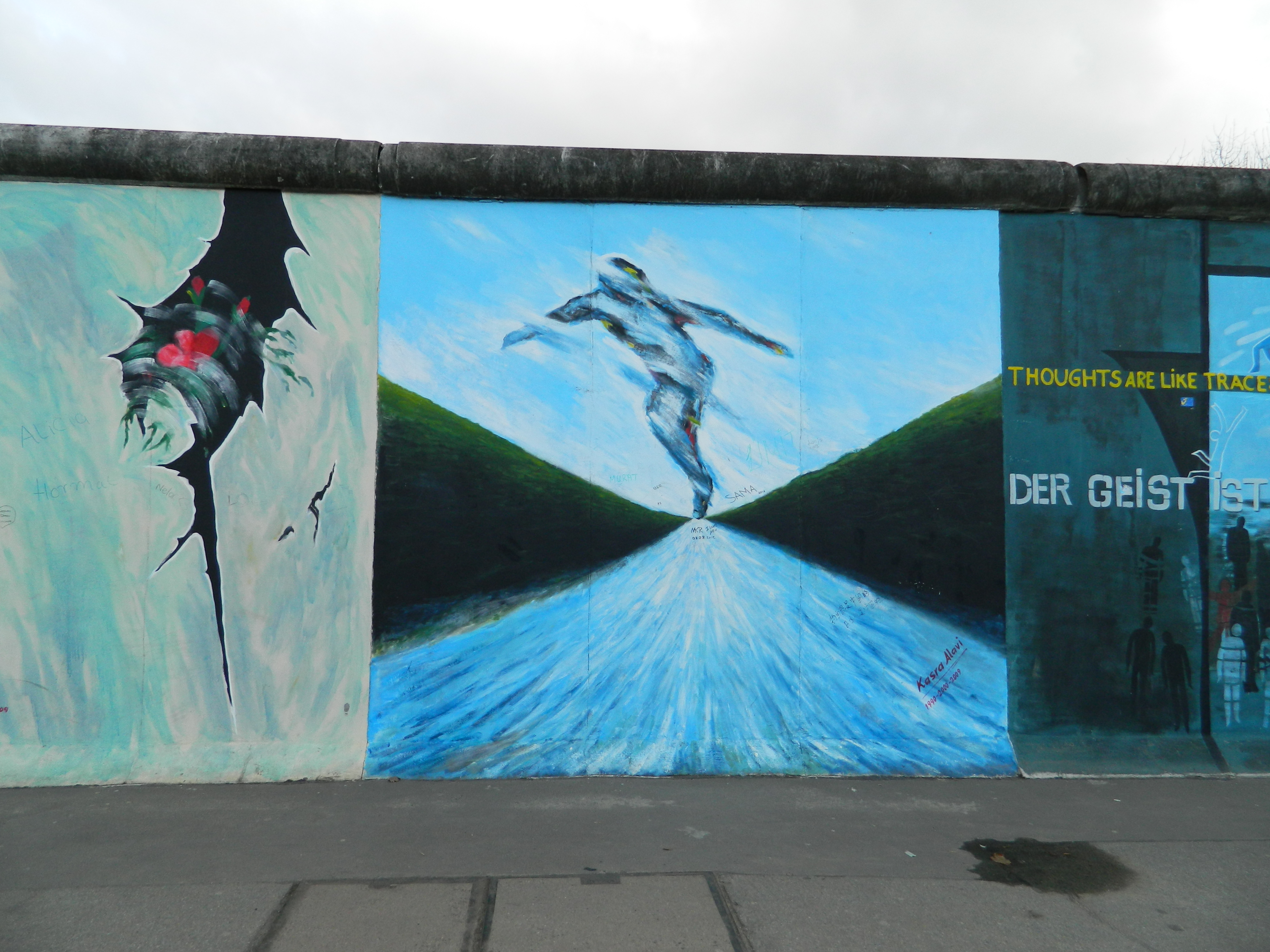

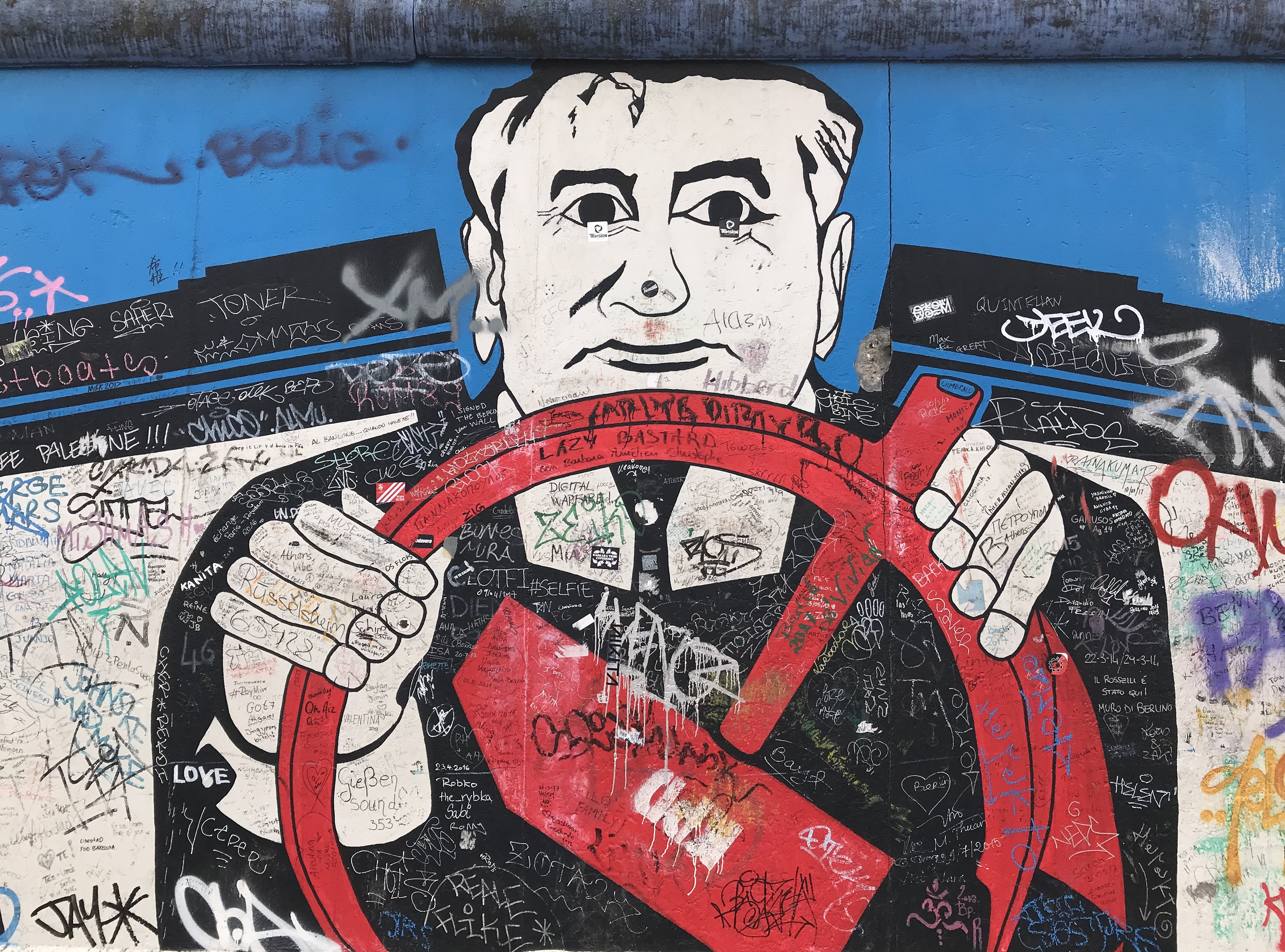

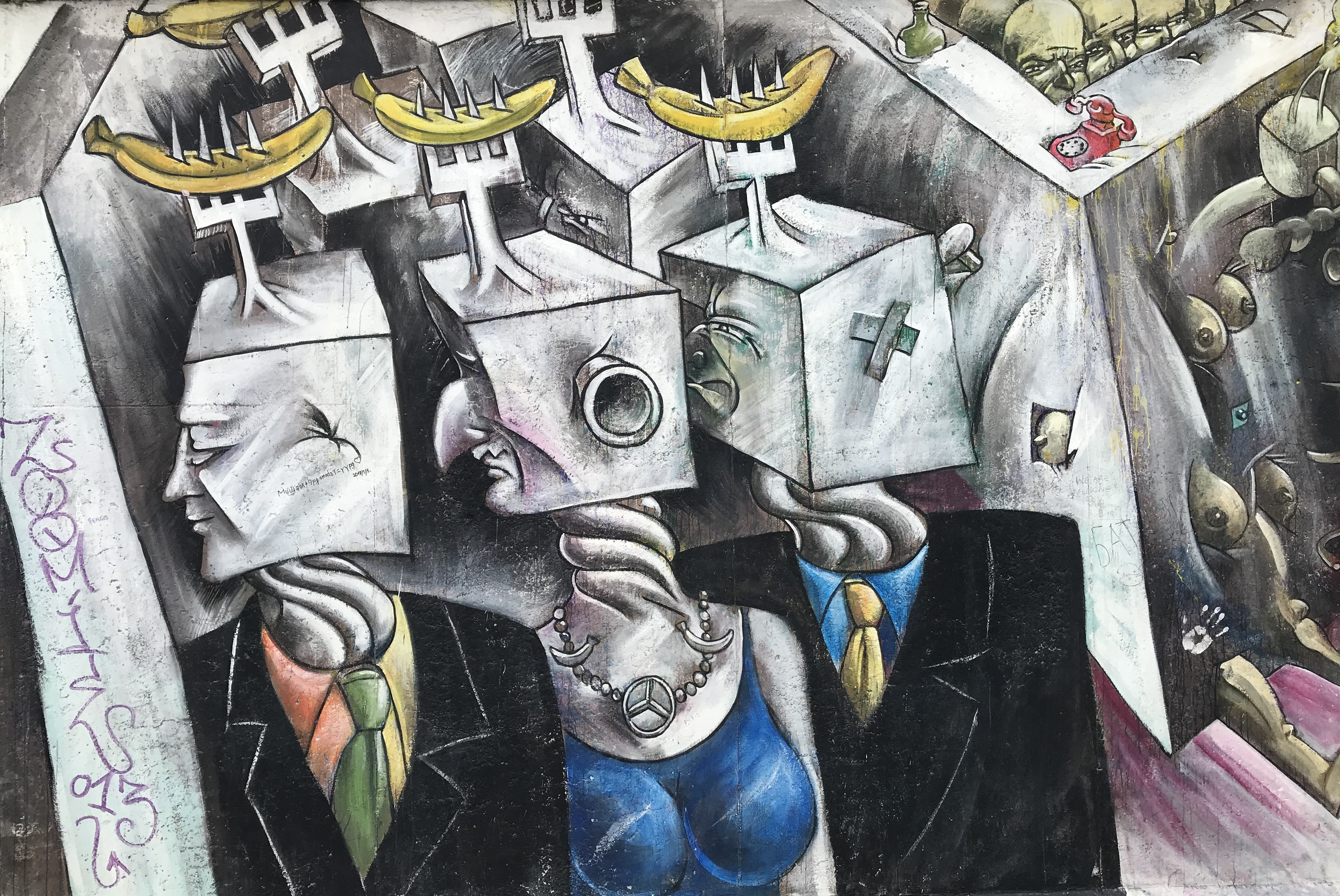

== See also ==
- List of tourist attractions in Berlin

== Literature ==
- Mauerkatalog "East Side Gallery". Oberbaum-Verlag, Berlin 1991, ISBN 3-928254-02-2
