= Make Everything Great Again =

Mural in Vilnius, Lithuania

- Artists: Dominykas Čečkauskas, Mindaugas Bonanu
- Year: 2016
- Type: Street art
- Dimensions: 250 cm × 450 cm (98 in × 177 in)
- Condition: Painted over
- Location: Vilnius, Lithuania; 54.67209°N 25.28755°E
- Website: Official website

Make Everything Great Again was a street art mural by artists Dominykas Čečkauskas and Mindaugas Bonanu. It was located on the wall of the barbecue restaurant Keulė Rūkė (Lithuanian for "Smoking Pig" (literal translation "The pig was smoking")) in the railway station area of old town of Vilnius in Lithuania. The name is a play on words to suggest the pig is either smoking a cigarette, or that the meat is smoked.

The mural depicting then U.S. Republican presidential candidate Donald Trump giving a fraternal kiss to the Russian president Vladimir Putin was unveiled in May 2016. The caption Make Everything Great Again plays on Trump's campaign slogan "Make America Great Again".

The Keulė Rūkė restaurant closed its doors in October 2019. Since July 2019, the mural was reported to have been painted over with the message "make empathy great again", although a small version of the original mural remained on a wall in the inner courtyard of the building.

== History ==
=== Background ===
The artwork was unveiled in May 2016. Make Everything Great Again appeared on the wall after Vladimir Putin and Donald Trump exchanged statements of mutual admiration, with the President of Russia describing Donald Trump as "a very colorful person, talented without any doubt," with Donald Trump replying that it was "a great honor to be so nicely complimented by a man so highly respected within his own country and beyond."

=== Inspiration ===
The image drew inspiration from photographs from 1979 of Leonid Brezhnev and Erich Honecker kissing as part of the socialist fraternal greeting which in turn inspired the 1990 graffiti painting My God, Help Me to Survive This Deadly Love portrayed on the Berlin Wall by Dmitri Vrubel.

One of the artists, Dominykas Čečkauskas, owned the restaurant that had asked for the artwork. He said in an interview: "We saw similarities between the two heroes (Trump and Putin). ... They both have an ego that is too big, and it is funny that they get along well." Čečkauskas said "We are in a sort of a Cold War again, and America may get a president who will want to be friends with Russia." The artists, with the help of the mural, predict that if Russia and the US would ever "make out, it would happen in the Baltic states ... with tongues or with tanks.”. The other artist, Mindaugas Bonanu, has stated that the kiss is not necessarily homoerotic. "I think there's nothing gay about them. They are kissing, right, like a Soviet Union thing; I think it's more about the past. But a lot of people especially in the US don't know the history," he has been cited as saying.

=== Vandalism and restoration ===
In August 2016, the mural was defaced by unknown individuals with white paint. It was subsequently restored, albeit changed into an image of Trump and Putin shotgunning a joint.

== Government reaction ==
Vilnius Mayor Remigijus Šimašius emphasized the values of civil liberties in his city in a statement to Lithuanian media organization LTnews.net: "There is no censorship in our city. That's why I support the idea of making this graffiti. It shows that Vilnius is the city of freedom, love and beauty." Šimašius further remarked on a post to his Facebook: "Vilnius is a city of freedom, where we don't have to be afraid of weapon rattling just several dozen kilometres away and express what we believe in without censorship."

== Commentary ==
The work rapidly became popular and commented upon both within its home country and in global newspapers. BBC News commented, "Once the initial shock has passed of seeing such testosterone-fuelled survivors of Cold War tension kissing, a closer look at the mural reveals a level of subtle political commentary that cuts against the superficial sensation." Esquire called it "a provocative mural, to say the least." Market Watch noted the mural had the impact of "sending a few ripples across the globe."
