= Cheek (disambiguation) =

The cheek is the area of the face below the eyes and between the nose and the left or right ear.

Cheek may also refer to:

== Places ==
- Cheek, Oklahoma, United States
- Cheek, Texas, United States
- Cheek Creek, Missouri, United States
- Cheeks Hill, a hill on Axe Edge Moor, Peak District, England

== People ==
- Cheek (rapper) (born 1981), Finnish rapper
- Cheek (surname)
- Mr. Cheeks or Terrance Kelly (born 1971), an American rapper

== Other uses ==
- Cheek (casting), an addition to a casting flask used to produce reentrant angles
- Cheek, a slang term for the buttocks
- The Cheek, a British indie pop band

== See also ==
- Cheek to Cheek (disambiguation)
- Cheekh, a 2019 Pakistani crime-drama television series
- Cheeks (disambiguation)
- Cheeky (disambiguation)
- Chic (disambiguation)
- Tongue-in-cheek (disambiguation)
