= List of international trips made by Leonid Brezhnev =

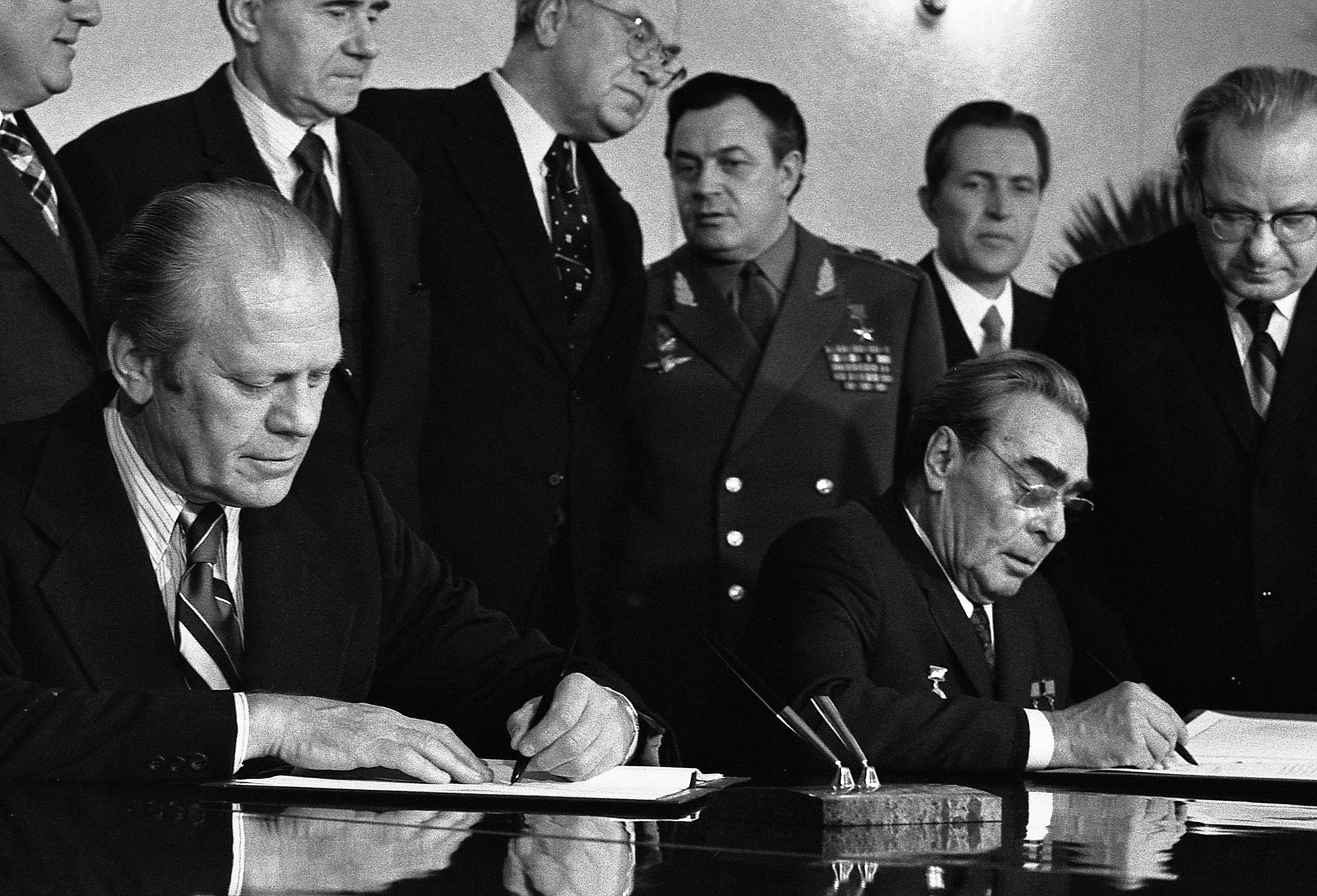
Brezhnev (seated right) and U.S. President Gerald Ford signing a joint communiqué on the SALT treaty in Vladivostok

This is a list of international visits made by Leonid Brezhnev during his tenure as General Secretary of the Communist Party of the Soviet Union (1964–1982) and Chairman of the Presidium of the Supreme Soviet (1977–1982).

== Summary of visits ==
=== 1960s ===
| Date | Country | City | Details |
|---|---|---|---|
| April 1965 | Polish People's Republic | Warsaw | State visit. |
| January 1966 | Mongolian People's Republic | Ulaanbaatar | State visit. |
| September 1966 | Socialist Republic of Romania | Bucharest | Met with General Secretary Nicolae Ceaușescu. |
| April 1967 | Czechoslovak Socialist Republic | Karlovy Vary | Attended the Conference of European Communist and Workers' Parties. |
| June 1967 | United Arab Republic | Cairo | Met with Egyptian President Gamal Abdel Nasser. |
| December 6-8, 1967 | Czechoslovak Socialist Republic | Prague | Working visit. Met with First Secretary Antonín Novotný. |
| January 1968 | Czechoslovak Socialist Republic | Prague | Visited during the early days of the Prague Spring. |

=== 1970s ===
| Date | Country | Locations visited | Details |
|---|---|---|---|
| November 1970 | Hungarian People's Republic | Budapest | Attended the 10th Congress of the Hungarian Socialist Workers' Party. |
| September 1971 | Yugoslavia | Belgrade | Official visit. |
| October 25-30, 1971 | France | Paris | Met with President Georges Pompidou. |
| December 1971 | Polish People's Republic | Warsaw | Attended the 6th Congress of the Polish United Workers' Party. |
| May 18-22, 1973 | West Germany | Bonn | State visit. Met with Chancellor Willy Brandt. |
| June 16–25, 1973 | United States | Washington, D.C., Camp David, San Clemente | State visit. |
| September 1973 | People's Republic of Bulgaria | Sofia | Official state visit to strengthen ties with Todor Zhivkov. |
| November 26-30, 1973 | India | New Delhi | State visit. Met with Prime Minister Indira Gandhi. |
| January 28–February 3, 1974 | Cuba | Havana | State visit where he met with President Osvaldo Dorticós Torrado and Prime Minister Fidel Castro. |
| July 1974 | Polish People's Republic | Warsaw | Attended celebrations marking the 30th anniversary of Communist Poland. |
| December 5-7, 1974 | France | Paris | Working visit. Met with President Valéry Giscard d'Estaing. |
| December 1974 | Mongolian People's Republic | Ulaanbaatar | State visit to mark the 50th anniversary of the republic. |
| March 1975 | Hungarian People's Republic | Budapest | Consultation with Warsaw Pact party leaders. |
| July 30 – August 1, 1975 | Finland | Helsinki | Attended the Conference on Security and Co-operation in Europe. Brezhnev signed the Helsinki Accords. |
| December 1975 | Polish People's Republic | Warsaw | Attended the 7th Congress of the Polish United Workers' Party. |
| November 1976 | Yugoslavia | Belgrade | Visited President Josip Broz Tito. |
| November 22-24, 1976 | Socialist Republic of Romania | Bucharest | Met with General Secretary Nicolae Ceaușescu. |
| June 20-22, 1977 | France | Paris | State visit. |
| May 4-7, 1978 | West Germany | Bonn | Met with Chancellor Helmut Schmidt. |
| May–June 1978 | Czechoslovak Socialist Republic | Prague | Official visit. General Secretary Gustáv Husák was decorated with the Order of the October Revolution at Prague Castle. |
| January 1979 | People's Republic of Bulgaria | Sofia | COMECON meeting. |
| June 15–18, 1979 | Austria | Vienna | Attended the Vienna Summit alongside U.S. President Jimmy Carter. The two leaders signed the SALT II arms limitation treaty. |
| October 5-8, 1979 | East Germany | East Berlin | Main article: My God, Help Me to Survive This Deadly Love Visited for the 30th anniversary celebrations of the German Democratic Republic. |

=== 1980s ===
| Date | Country | Locations visited | Details |
|---|---|---|---|
| May 6-7, 1980 | Yugoslavia | Belgrade | Attended the state funeral of Josip Broz Tito. |
| December 8-11, 1980 | India | New Delhi | State visit. |
| April 5-10, 1981 | Czechoslovak Socialist Republic | Prague | Attended the 16th Congress of the Communist Party of Czechoslovakia. |
| November 22-25, 1981 | West Germany | Bonn | State visit. |
