= Cheek to Cheek (disambiguation) =

"Cheek to Cheek" is a song written by Irving Berlin in 1935.

Cheek to Cheek may also refer to:

== Film and TV ==
- "Cheek to Cheek" (St. Elsewhere), 1986

== Music ==
=== Albums ===
- Cheek to Cheek (album), 2014 album by Tony Bennett and Lady Gaga
- Cheek to Cheek, 2006 album by Beegie Adair
- Cheek to Cheek, 2009 album by Lisa Ono
- Cheek to Cheek, 2011 album by Barbara Cook and Michael Feinstein
- Cheek to Cheek: The Complete Duet Recordings, 2018 album by Ella Fitzgerald and Louis Armstrong
- Cheek to Cheek, 1975 album by The Belmonts

=== Songs ===
- "Cheek to Cheek", 2007 song by Sahara Hotnights on What If Leaving Is a Loving Thing

== Culture ==
- Cheek kissing may involve cheek-to-cheek contact

== See also ==
- Cheek (disambiguation)
