= Berlin Wall graffiti art =

Underground street art on the Berlin Border

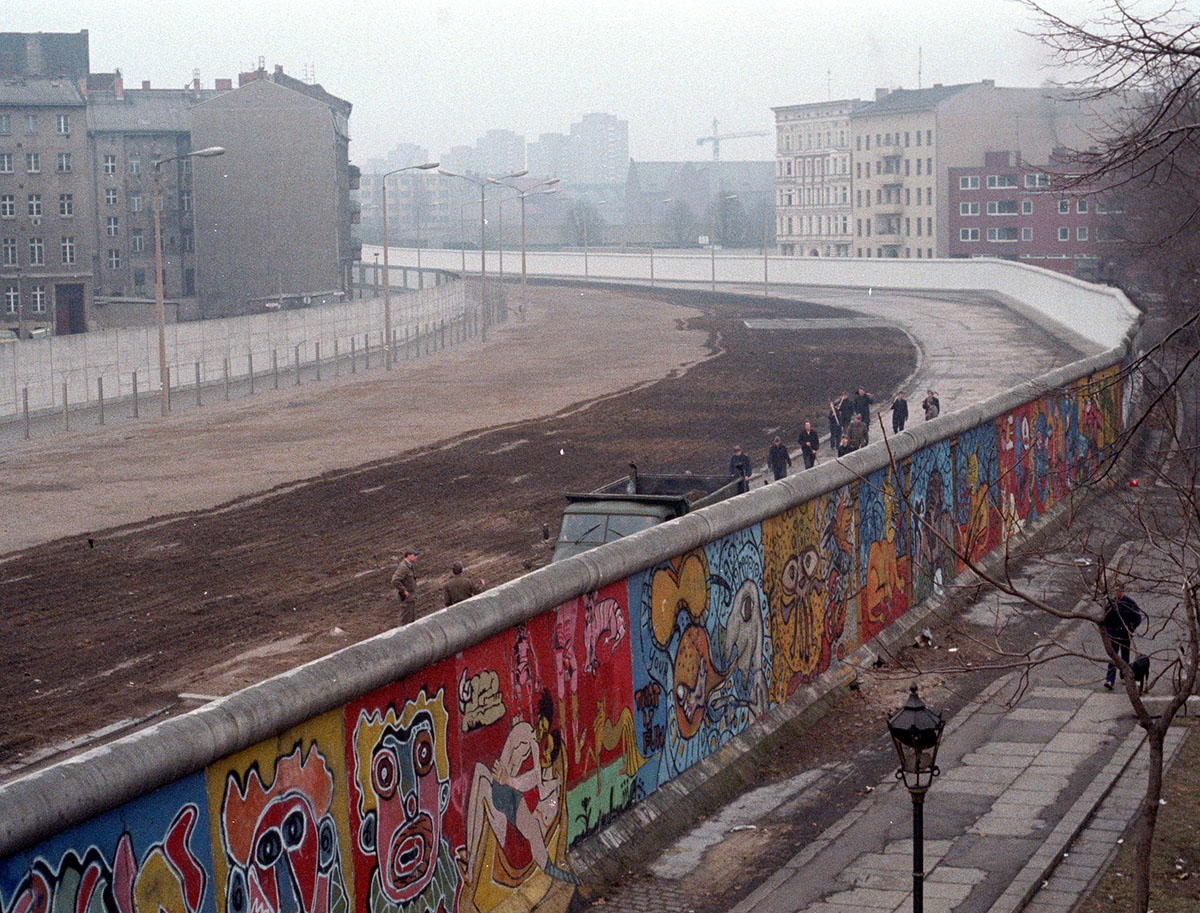
The Berlin Wall with graffiti art on the West Berlin side and the "Death Strip" on the East

The Berlin Wall was the site of a large volume of border art during its existence. Its highly contentious nature made it a popular place of political and cultural expression. After its reconstruction in the 1980s, graffiting on the wall became popular for artists worldwide and the art made it a common tourist destination. Only the West Berlin side of the wall had artwork, as citizens of East Berlin were not allowed to get close enough to the wall to paint on it.

One of the first artists to paint on the wall was Thierry Noir, who sought to express the emotions surrounding its presence. It was one of the largest canvases in the world, and much of the artwork was not claimed by artists. Almost all of the wall has been removed and it only exists in places such as Potsdamer Platz, the East Side Gallery, and Bernauer Straße; many segments are now exhibited in other countries; see List of Berlin Wall segments.

== Gallery ==
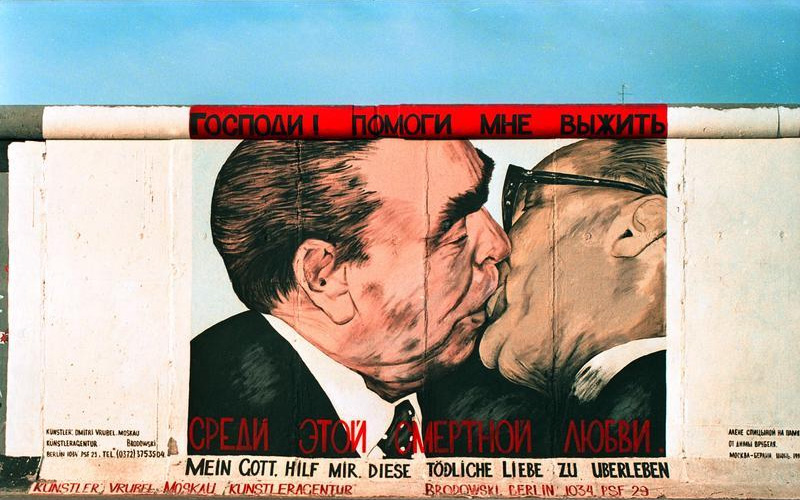
My God, Help Me to Survive This Deadly Love, Leonid Brezhnev and Erich Honecker in a fraternal embrace, reproducing a photograph that captured the moment in October 1979 during the 30th anniversary celebration of the foundation of the German Democratic Republic

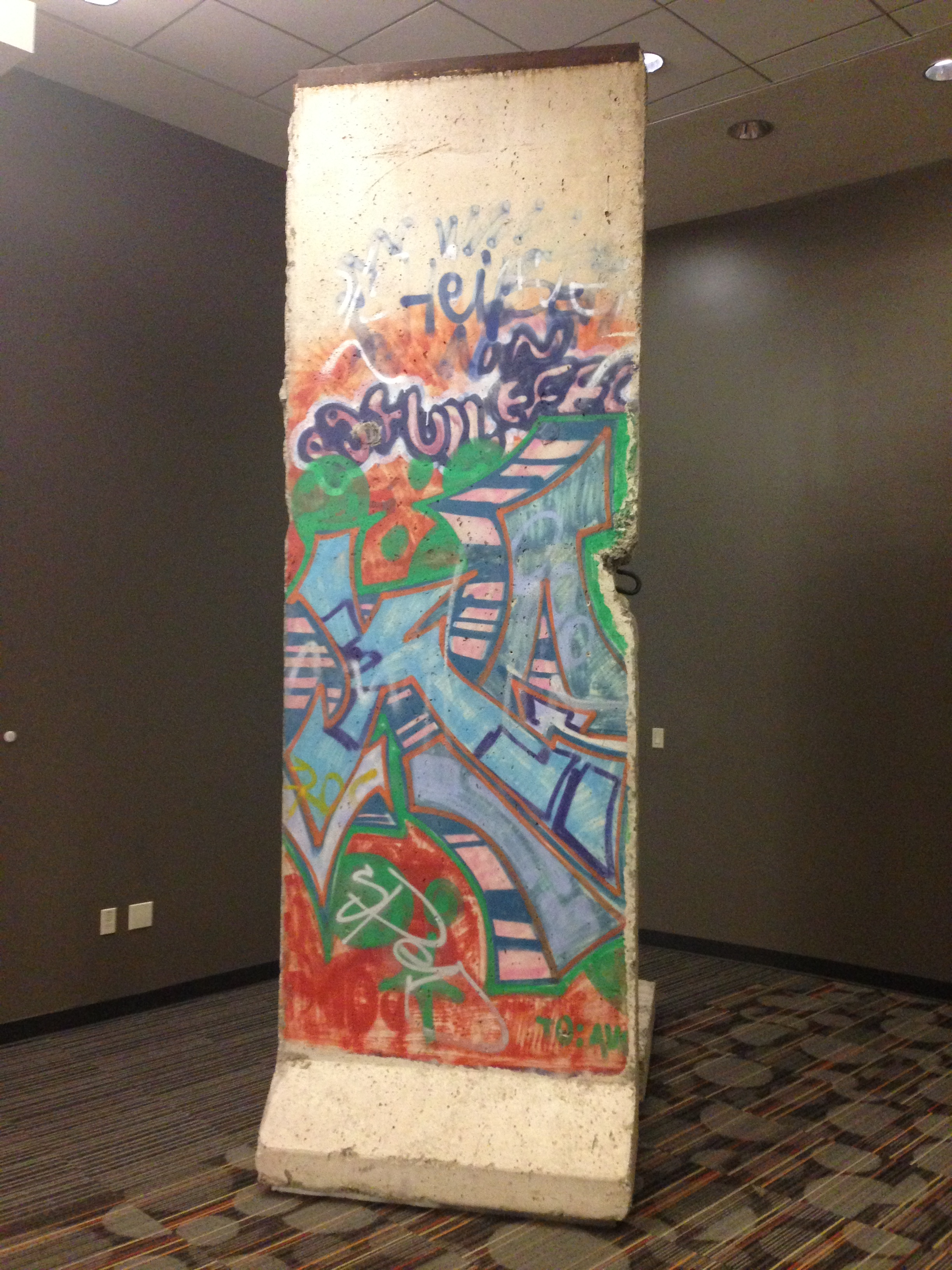
Original part of the Berlin Wall 1989; gift from Daimler-Benz AG to Bill Gates on February 8, 1996. At Microsoft Conference Center in Redmond, Washington

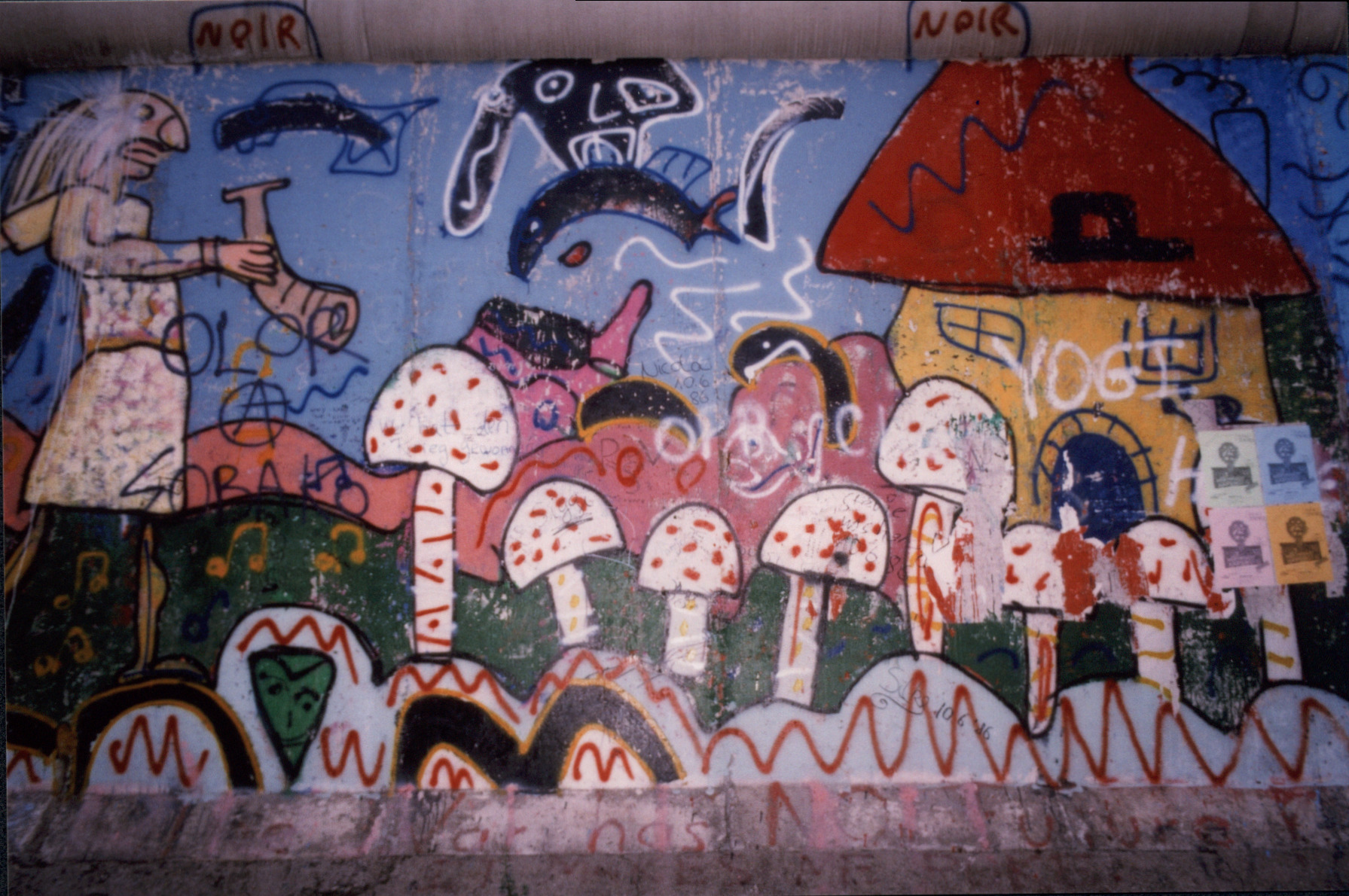
Mushroom art on Berlin Wall, 1986

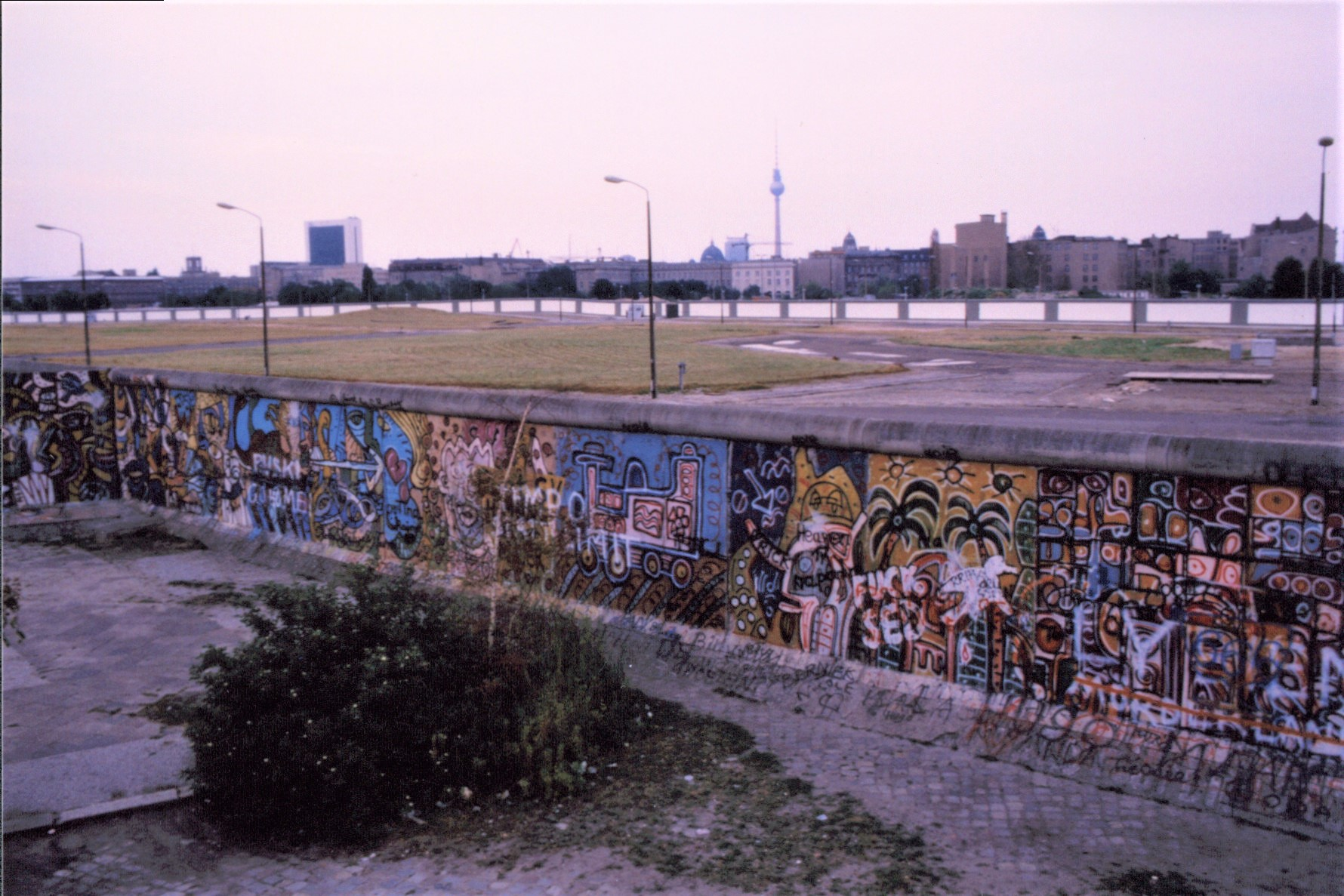
Berlin Wall looking east from the west side, 1986

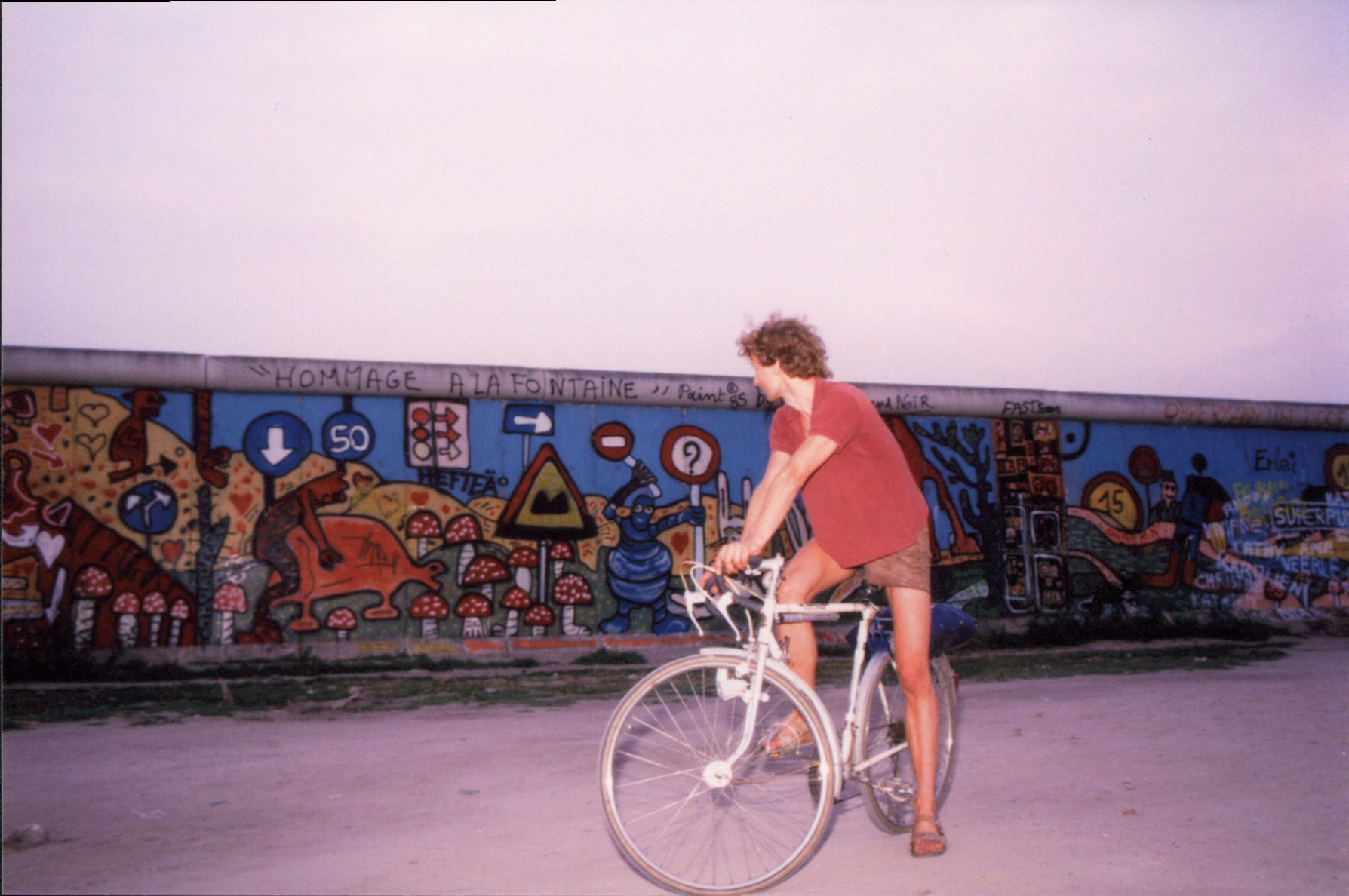
Traffic sign art on Berlin Wall, 1986

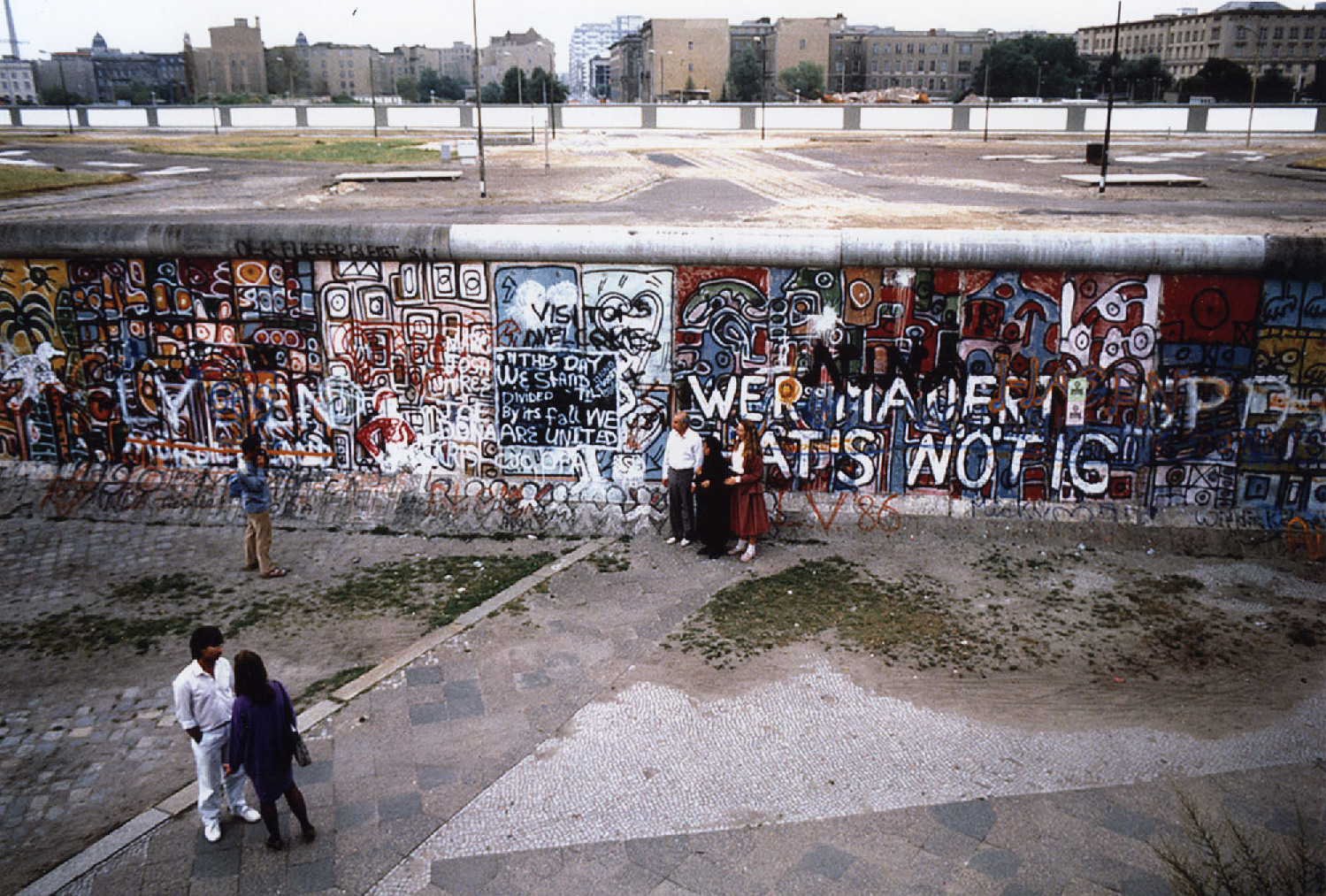
Near Potsdamer Platz, 1986

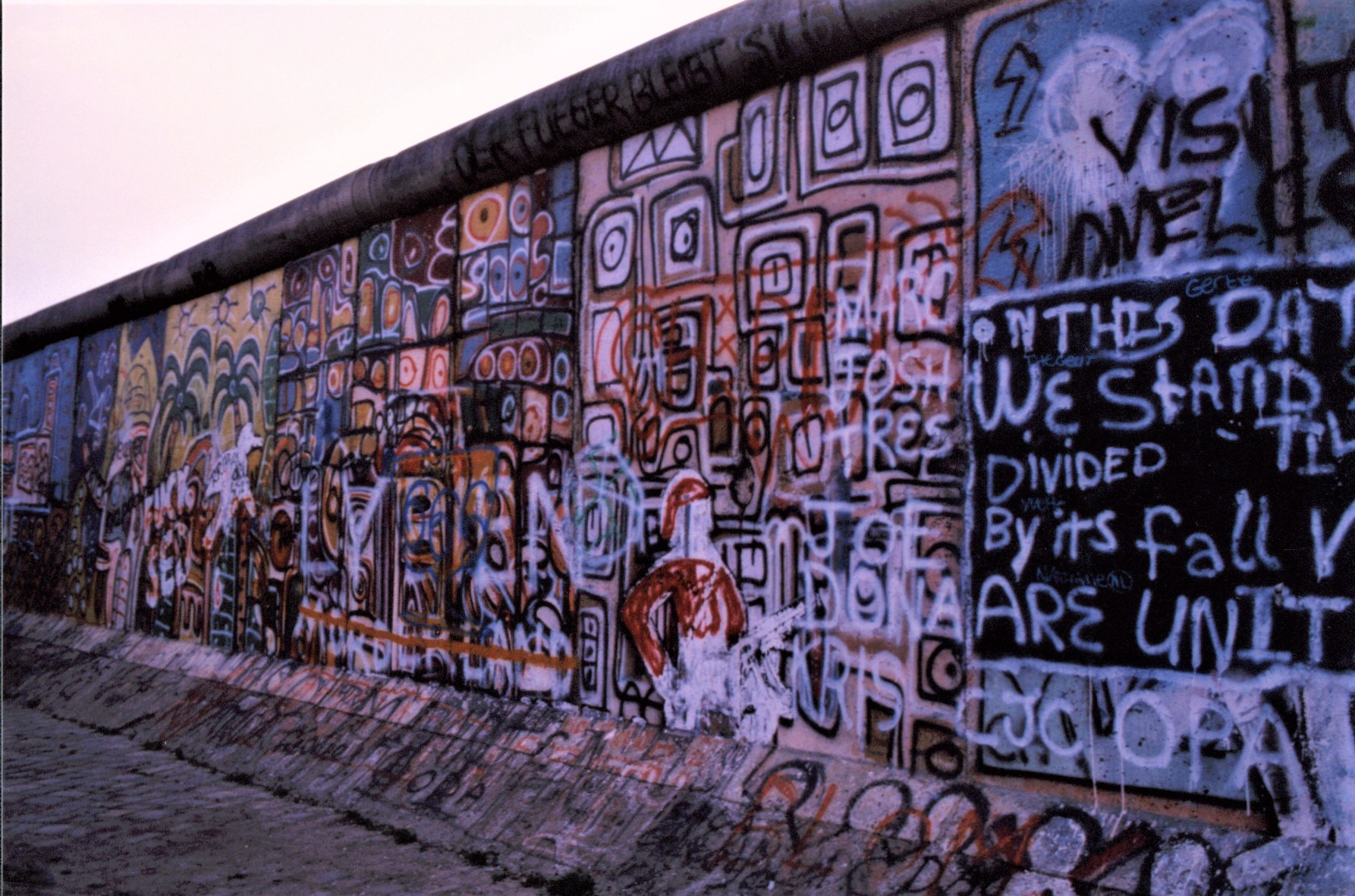
Berlin Wall graffiti reads: "In this day we stand divided--by its fall we are united", 1986

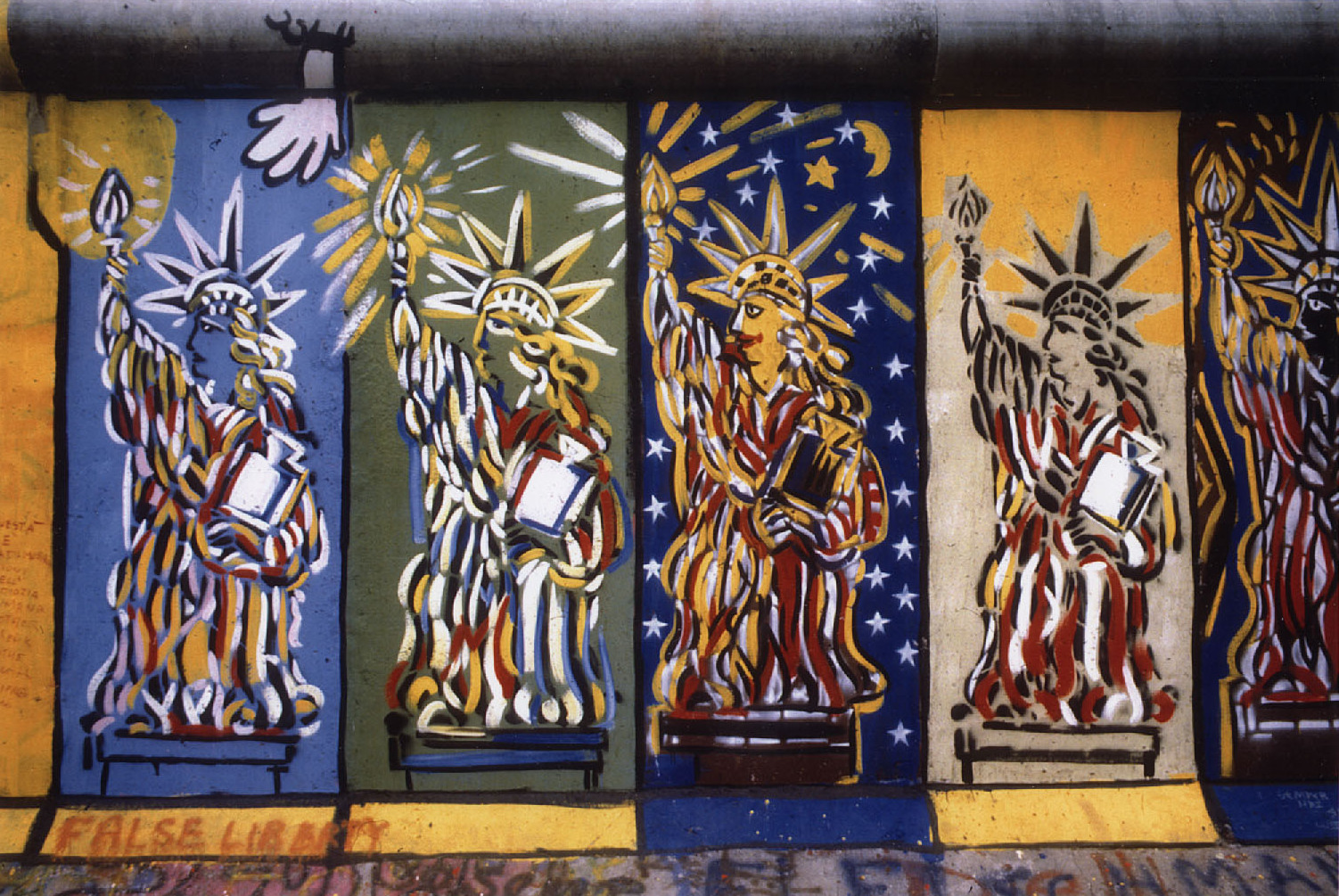
Variations on the Statue of Liberty, 1986
