= Cheeks (disambiguation) =

Cheeks is the plural form of cheek. It may also refer to:

== People ==
- B. W. Cheeks (1941–1973), American football player
- Judy Cheeks (1954–2025), American singer and actress
- Maurice Cheeks (born 1956), American National Basketball Association coach and former player
- Mr. Cheeks, (born 1971) American rapper
- Robert Cheeks (born 1980), American basketball player

== Other uses ==
- Cheeks, a slang term for buttocks
- Cheeks, a character associated with DC Comics character Ambush Bug
- Monsieur Cheeks, character from the manga/anime series Kinnikuman
- Sandy Cheeks, a fictional squirrel in the American animated TV series SpongeBob SquarePants
- Cheeks Hill, Peak District, England
- Cheeks Nunatak, a nunatak in Palmer Land, Antarctica
- Lena Cheeks, Irkutsk Oblast, Russia

== See also ==
- Carolyn Cheeks Kilpatrick (born 1945), American politician
- Cheek (disambiguation)
