= Cheek (surname) =

Cheek is an English and (after 1600 ) American family name.

People with this name include:

- Alison Cheek (1927–2019), Australian priest, one of the first women ordained in the Episcopal Church
- Bob Cheek (born 1944), Australian politician
- Chris Cheek (born 1968), American jazz saxophonist
- Cordie Cheek (1916–1933), falsely accused African-American lynching victim
- Curtis Cheek (1958–2024), American bridge player and aerospace engineer
- Davis Cheek (born 1999), American football player
- James E. Cheek (1932–2010), President of Howard University
- James Richard Cheek (1936–2011), American diplomat
- Jan Cheek (born 1948), Falkland Islands politician
- Joel Owsley Cheek (1852–1935), creator of Maxwell House coffee
- Joey Cheek (born 1979), American former speed skater, world and Olympic champion
- John Cheek (1855–1942), Australian politician
- John Cheke or Cheek (1514–1557), English Greek scholar and politician, tutor to the future King Edward VI
- Joy Cheek (born 1988), American basketball player
- King Virgil Cheek (born 1937), former President of Shaw University and Morgan State University
- Louis Cheek (born 1964), American former National Football League player
- Lota Cheek (1898–1978), American actress and model
- Marion Case Cheek (1888–1969), US Navy rear admiral
- Martin Cheek (born 1960), English botanist and taxonomist
- Mavis Cheek (1948–2023), English novelist and feminist
- Rick Cheek (born 1977), American kickboxer and mixed martial artist
- Ruben Loftus-Cheek (born 1996), English football player
- Thomas Cheek (died 1659), English politician
- Thomas Cheek (Australian politician) (1894–1994)
- Tom Cheek (1939–2005), American sportscaster
- Trevien Anthonie Cheek, American drag queen known as Heidi N Closer

== See also ==
- List of Old English (Anglo-Saxon) surnames
