= Dmitri Vrubel =

Russian painter (1960–2022)

- Дмитрий Врубель
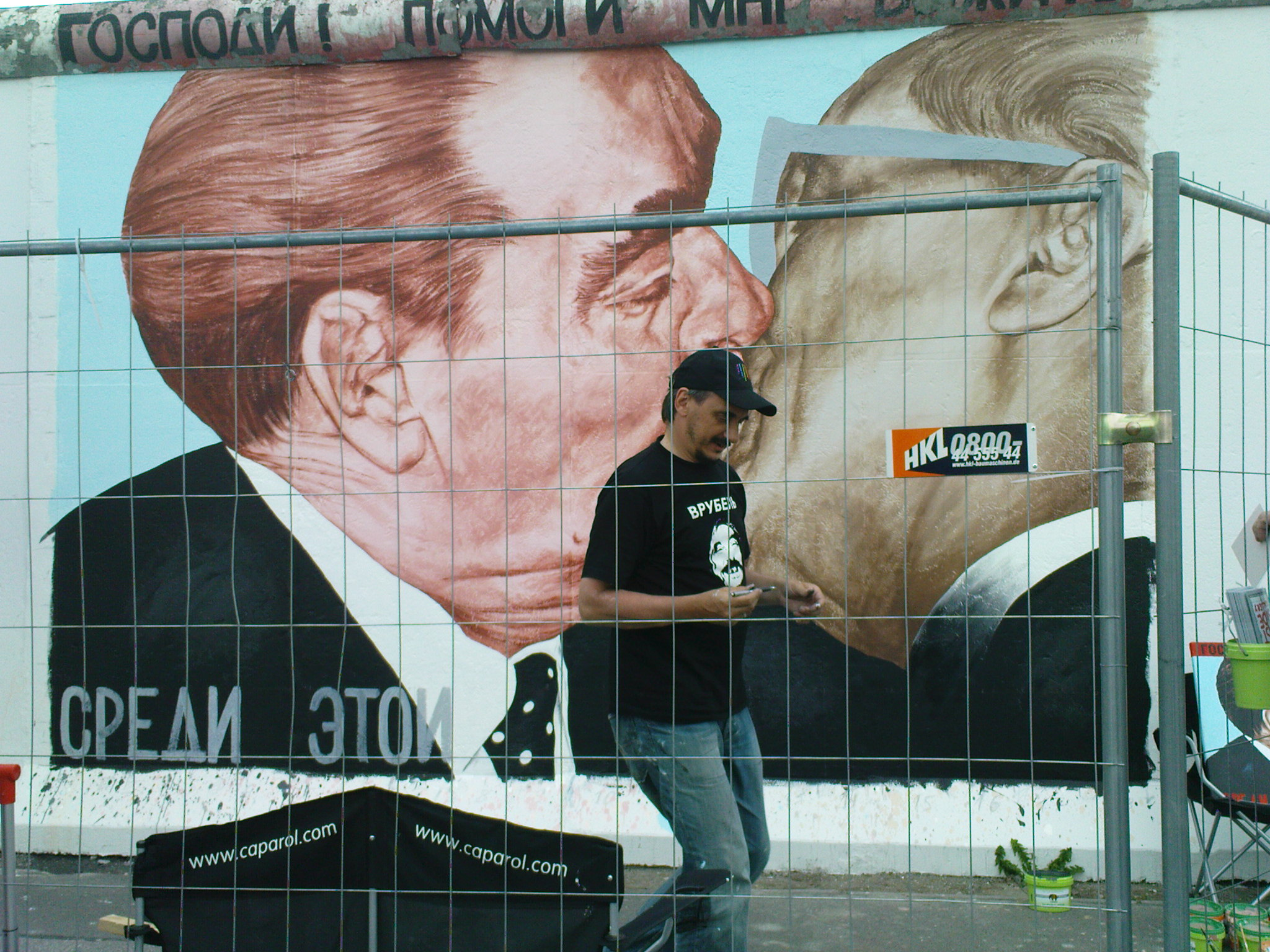
- Vrubel during restoration of his artwork Mein Gott, hilf mir diese tödliche Liebe zu überleben
- Born: Dmitri Vladimirovich Vrubel; 14 July 1960; Moscow, Russian SFSR, Soviet Union
- Died: 13 August 2022 (aged 62); Berlin, Germany
- Education: Moscow State Pedagogical University
- Notable work: My God, Help Me to Survive This Deadly Love
- Style: Street art
- Movement: Sots Art
- Spouse: Viktoria Timofeyeva

Dmitri Vladimirovich Vrubel (Russian: Дмитрий Владимирович Врубель; 14 July 1960 – 13 August 2022) was a Russian painter. He was best known for his satirical East Side Gallery-painting My God, Help Me to Survive This Deadly Love, depicting the kissing communist leaders Leonid Brezhnev and Erich Honecker.

Vrubel was born in Moscow, Soviet Union. His surname is a russification of the common Polish surname Wróbel.

== Early life ==
He was the only child of two engineers. He started painting at 15 and studied at the graphic art department of the Moscow State V.I. Lenin Pedagogical Institute.

== Work ==
Vrubel's most famous work is the graffiti piece, painted on the Berlin Wall entitled My God, Help Me to Survive This Deadly Love which depicts the kissing communist leaders Leonid Brezhnev and Erich Honecker.

It was inspired by a photograph captured by photographer Regis Bossu depicting a socialist fraternal kiss between the leaders Leonid Brezhnev and Erich Honecker in 1979, during a celebration of the 30 years of the GDR.

In 2009, the painting was removed by the authorities as part of a cleaning effort in order to have it repainted by Vrubel.

=== Other works ===
In 2001, he and his wife, Viktoria Timofeyeva, created a large format calendar containing portraits of Russian President Vladimir Putin called "The 12 moods of Putin". Each page of the calendar portrayed a different image of Putin and was an unexpected hit with the Moscow population.

== Death ==
Vrubel died in Berlin from complications of COVID-19 on 14 August 2022, at the age of 62.
