= Tongue-in-cheek (disambiguation) =

Tongue-in-cheek refers to a humorous or sarcastic statement expressed in a mock serious manner.

Tongue-in-cheek may also refer to:

- Tongue n' Cheek, a 2009 album by British rapper Dizzee Rascal
- Tongue 'n' Cheek, a British electro music band

== See also ==
- The Anatomy of the Tongue in Cheek, a 2001 album by Christian rock band Relient K
- Cheek (disambiguation)
