= Cheeky =

Cheeky may refer to:

- Cheeky (film) or Trasgredire, a 2000 sex comedy directed by Tinto Brass
- Cheeky (2003 film), a 2003 comedy-drama film directed by David Thewlis
- Cheeky Watson (born 1954), South African rugby union player
- Cheeky Weekly, a defunct British comics magazine
- Cheeky, Australian hip hop artist in the group Downsyde
- "Cheeky", a 2002 song by Bruce Boniface
- Cheeky, a style of bikini underwear or swimsuit
- Cheeky Records, a British record label founded by Rollo Armstrong

== See also ==
- Cheekye, British Columbia, Canada, an unincorporated locality
- Cheek (disambiguation)
