= Marion Case Cheek =

- Born: October 18, 1888; Ripley, Tennessee
- Died: June 20, 1969 (aged 80); San Francisco, California
- Burial place: San Francisco National Cemetery
- Military career
- Allegiance: United States
- Branch: United States Navy
- Service years: 1911–1945
- Rank: Rear Admiral USN(R)
- Conflicts: World War II
- Awards: Navy Cross; Legion of Merit (2); Bronze Star Medal; Intelligence Medal of Merit
- Other work: Central Intelligence Agency

Admiral Marion Case Cheek, USN(R) (October 18, 1888 – June 20, 1969) was a Rear Admiral in the United States Navy Reserve. During World War II, he served as an intelligence officer in the Pacific. After retiring from the Navy, he worked for the Central Intelligence Agency.

== Biography ==
Cheek graduated from the United States Naval Academy at Annapolis in 1911.

=== World War II ===
As a lieutenant commander at the outbreak of World War II, in September 1942 he received the Navy Cross "For distinguished service in the line of his profession as Intelligence Officer of the Sixteenth Naval District in the city of Manila" during which he volunteered for a number of assignments which brought him under enemy fire.

He was sent to Corregidor and later to Australia along with a million pesos of Philippine government funds.

Promoted to commander, he became part of Admiral William F. Halsey's Third Fleet staff and part of its unofficial "Dirty Tricks Department," which also included Rear Admiral Robert Bostwick Carney, Commander Harold Stassen, Captain Ralph E. Wilson, Captain Leonard J. Dow, and Commander Horace D. Moulton.

During his time with the Third Fleet he was awarded the Legion of Merit twice, and the Bronze Star. He was promoted to captain on August 1, 1943

Captain Cheek returned to his role in the reserves as a commander after the war, but was promoted to captain on July 25, 1949, with relative precedence to his previous promotion to captain, and rear admiral on November 10, 1949.

=== Post-war career ===
He went to work for the Central Intelligence Agency where he received the Intelligence Medal of Merit for his service. He retired from government service in 1958.

He is buried at San Francisco National Cemetery.
