= My God, Help Me to Survive This Deadly Love =

Graffiti painting on the Berlin Wall

My God, Help Me to Survive this Deadly Love
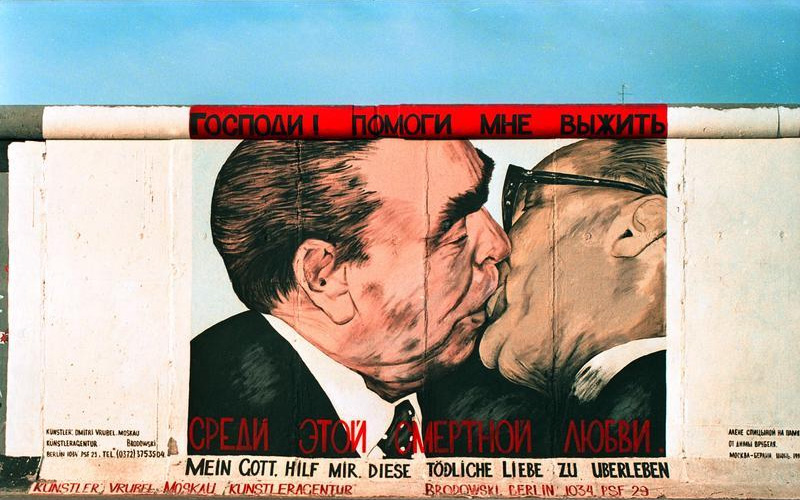
- Artist: Dmitri Vrubel
- Year: 1990
- Type: Graffiti
- Dimensions: 365 cm × 480 cm (143.7 in × 189 in)
- Location: East Side Gallery, Berlin, Germany

My God, Help Me to Survive This Deadly Love, (Note: Russian: «Го́споди! Помоги́ мне вы́жить среди́ э́той сме́ртной любви́», romanized: Góspodi! Pomogí mne výzhit' sredí étoy smértnoy lyubví; German: Mein Gott, hilf mir, diese tödliche Liebe zu überleben.) sometimes referred to as the Fraternal Kiss, (Note: German: Bruderkuss; Russian: Бра́тский поцелу́й, romanized: Brátskiy potselúy.) is a street art mural by Dmitri Vrubel on the eastern side of the Berlin Wall, Germany. Painted in 1990, it has become one of the best known pieces of Berlin Wall graffiti art. The painting depicts Leonid Brezhnev and Erich Honecker in a socialist fraternal kiss, reproducing a photograph taken in 1979 during the 30th anniversary celebration of the foundation of the German Democratic Republic.

== Photograph ==
The photograph capturing the embrace was taken by Régis Bossu in East Berlin on 7 October 1979. It was widely republished. Brezhnev was visiting East Germany at the time to celebrate the anniversary of its founding as a Communist nation. On 5 October, East Germany and the Soviet Union had signed a ten-year agreement of mutual support under which East Germany would provide ships, machinery and chemical equipment to the Soviet Union and the Soviet Union would provide fuel and nuclear equipment to East Germany.

The photograph

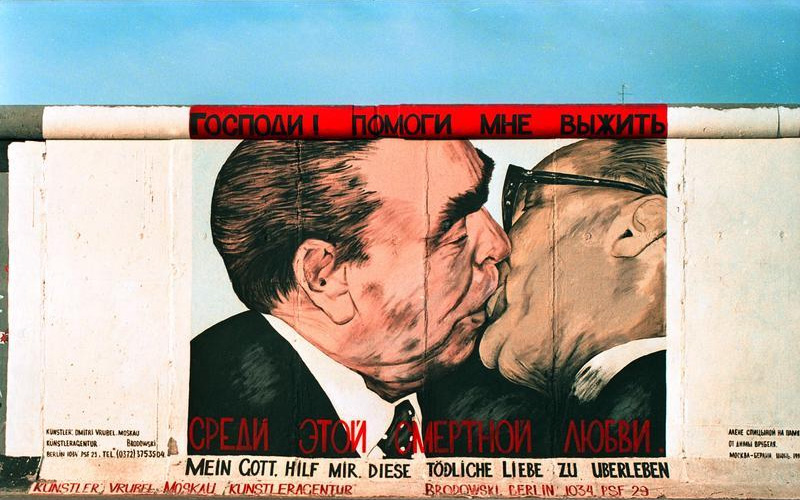
Condition of the mural on 25 July 1991

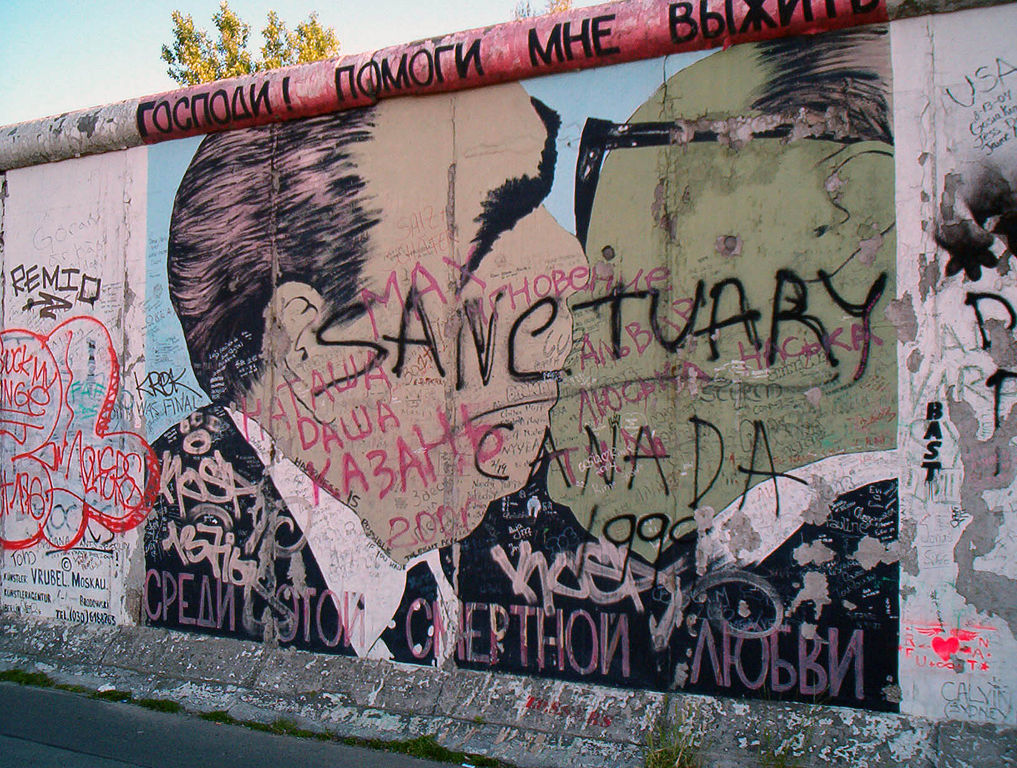
Condition of the mural in 2005

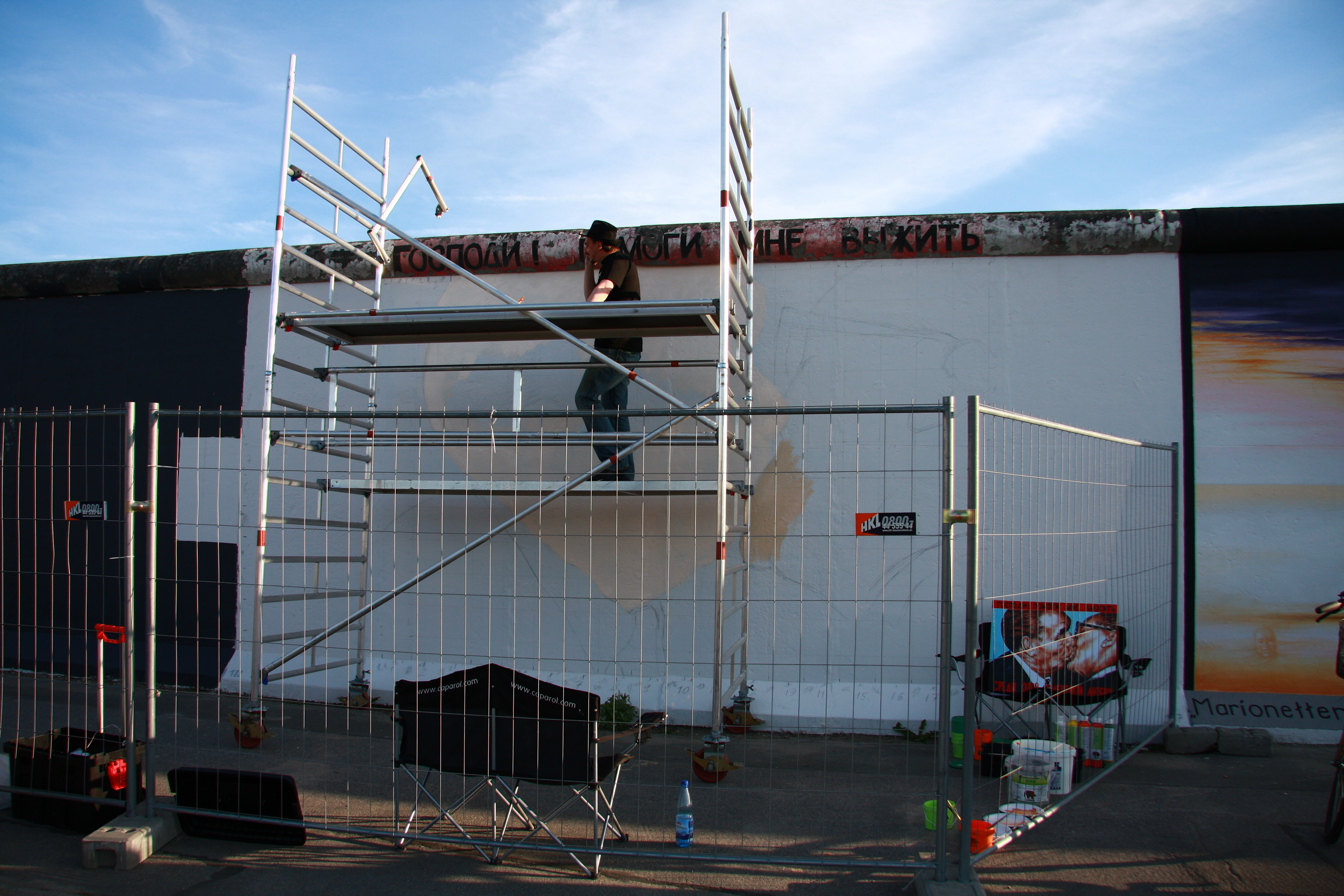
Dmitri Vrubel during restoration in June 2009

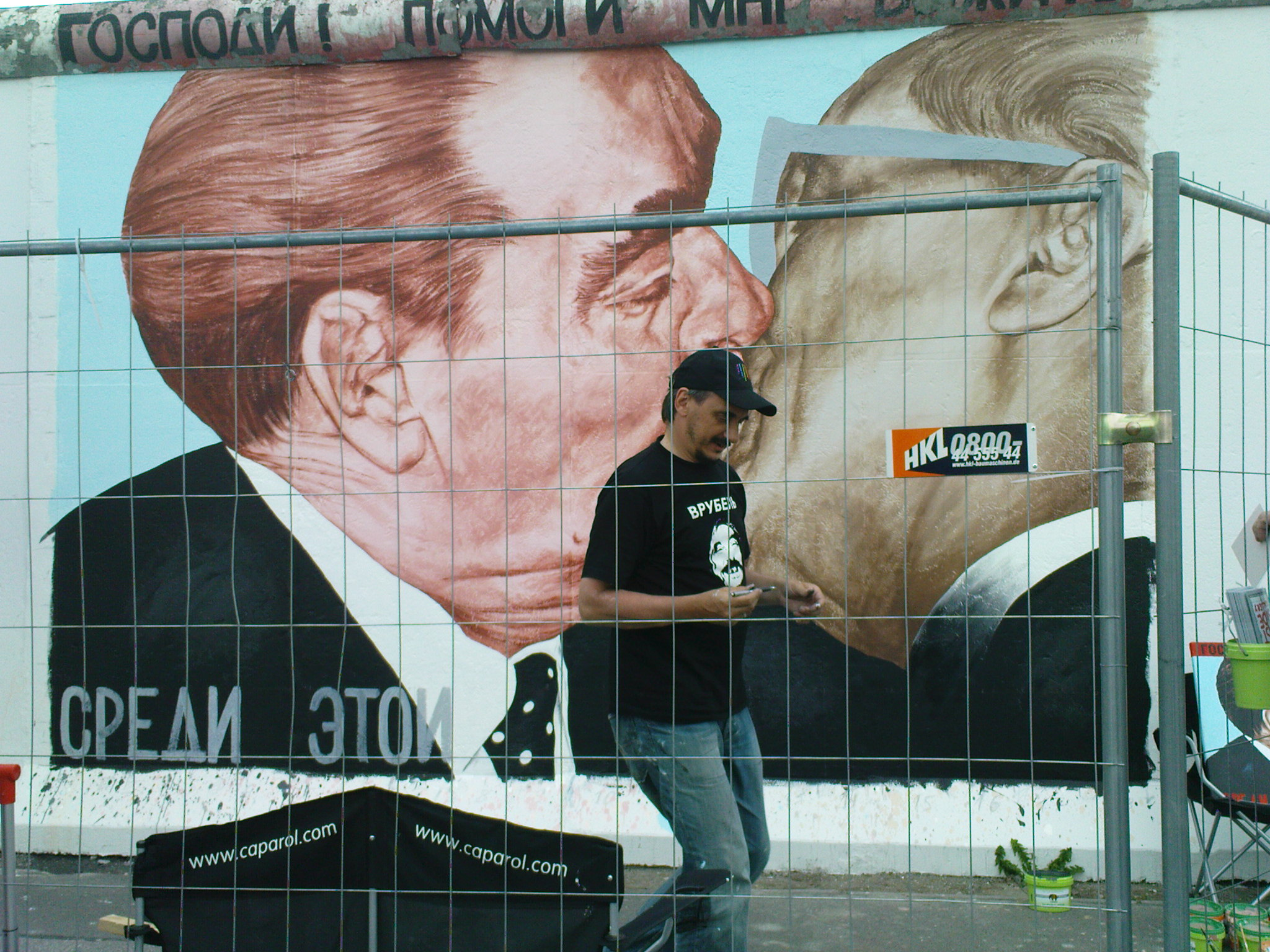
Restoration nearly complete

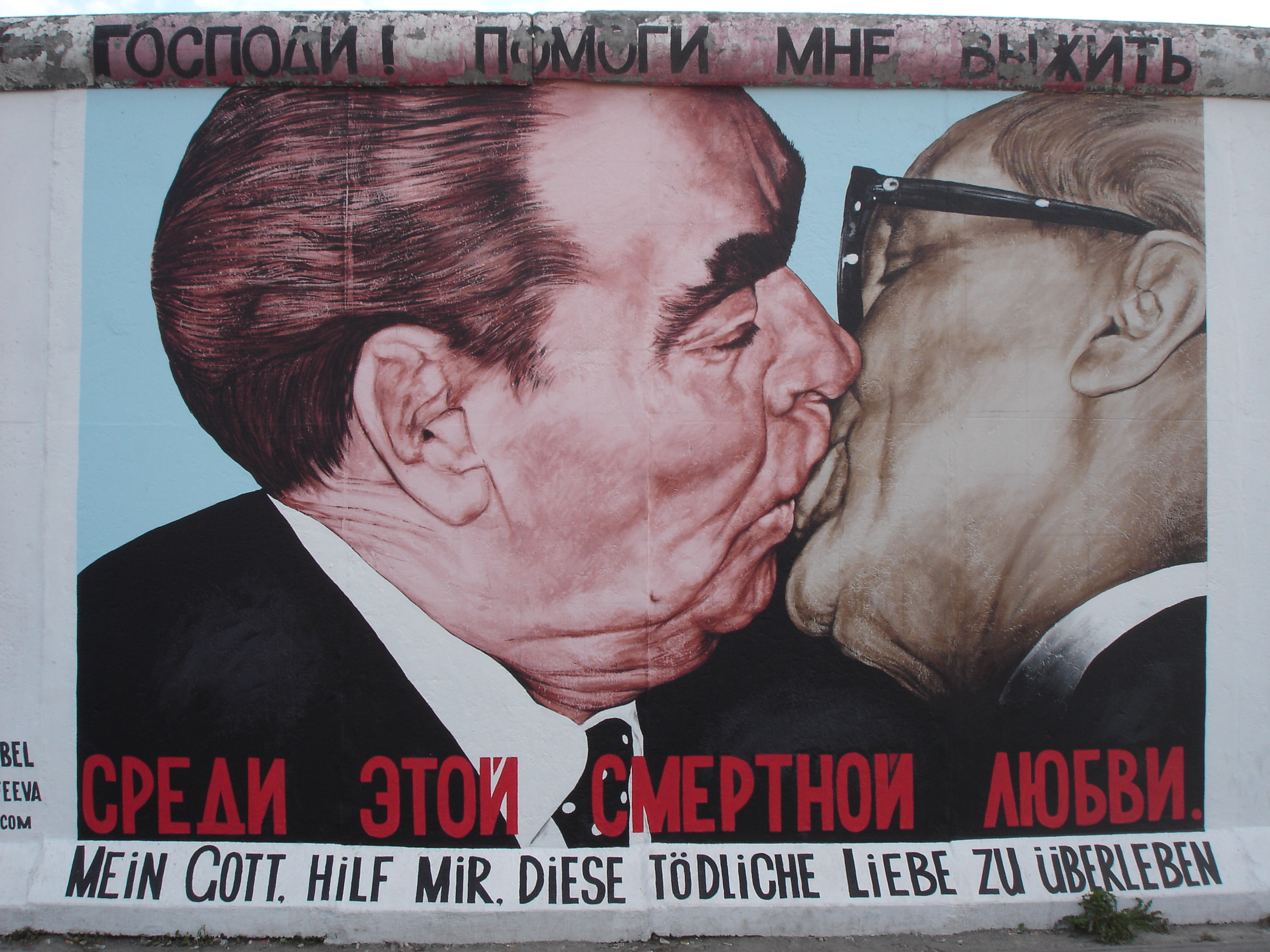
The mural, fully restored on 18 August 2009

The photograph the mural is based on, followed by the mural as it appeared in various conditions. The Russian words at the top read "God! help me stay alive"; and continue at the bottom "Among this mortal love."

== Painting ==
Vrubel created the painting in 1990 on the eastern side of the Berlin Wall. Until the fall of the Berlin Wall in 1989, Berlin Wall graffiti art existed only on the western side. Vrubel attempted to obtain permission to paint on the eastern side, but the East German Ministry of National Defence disclaimed responsibility for the Wall. Instead, he found a "Scottish girl" selling "permits" to paint on the Wall (the "Scottish girl" in question was Christine MacLean.), and he signed a contract that gave up all of his rights to the painting.

Along with other murals in the section, the painting continued in display after the wall was taken down, but vandalism and atmospheric conditions gradually led to its deterioration. In March 2009, the painting, along with others, was erased from the wall to allow the original artists to repaint them with more durable paints. Vrubel was commissioned to repaint the piece, donating the €3000 fee he was paid to a social art project in Marzahn.

In terms of style, there are slight differences between the 1990 and remade 2009 murals, and Vrubel has said that he made technical mistakes on the original piece due to inexperience with the method. The main message did not change.

Photographer Bossu and Vrubel met in 2009 and were photographed together on 16 June with reproductions of their works.

=== Critical reception ===
My God, Help Me to Survive This Deadly Love has become one of the best known works of graffiti art on the Berlin Wall. According to Anthony Read and David Fisher, the painting is "particularly striking, with a sharp, satirical edge." It was also widely criticized on creation as a straightforward reproduction of the photograph that inspired it.

In a 2014 interview, the artist explained how the location and characters give meaning to the painting: "In this painting, there's one German and one Russian, and the Berlin Wall is about the same thing but in reverse: here [in the painting], there's total love, while the Berlin Wall separates two worlds – it was a perfect fit." He wanted to create a "wow" factor but did not expect the success it had.

Prominent derivative works include Make Everything Great Again, a 2016 Lithuanian mural of Russian president Vladimir Putin and United States president Donald Trump in a similar pose, and a 2016 mural in Bristol featuring Donald Trump and pro-Brexit campaigner and British Member of Parliament Boris Johnson in the run-up to the 2016 referendum.

== See also ==
- Sots Art
