= Cheek kissing =

Social kissing gesture

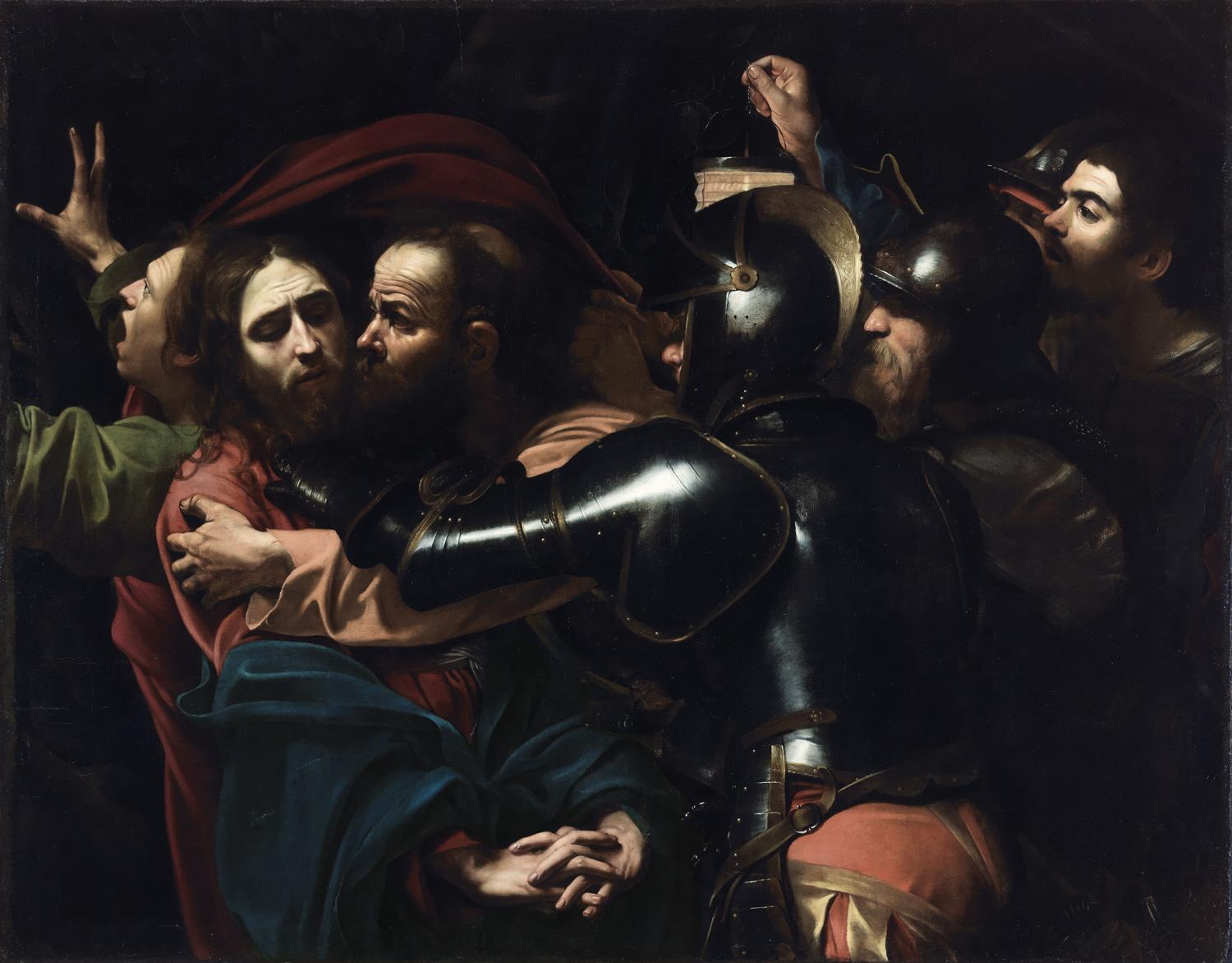
Judas cheek kissing Christ. Oil on canvas by Caravaggio, 1602

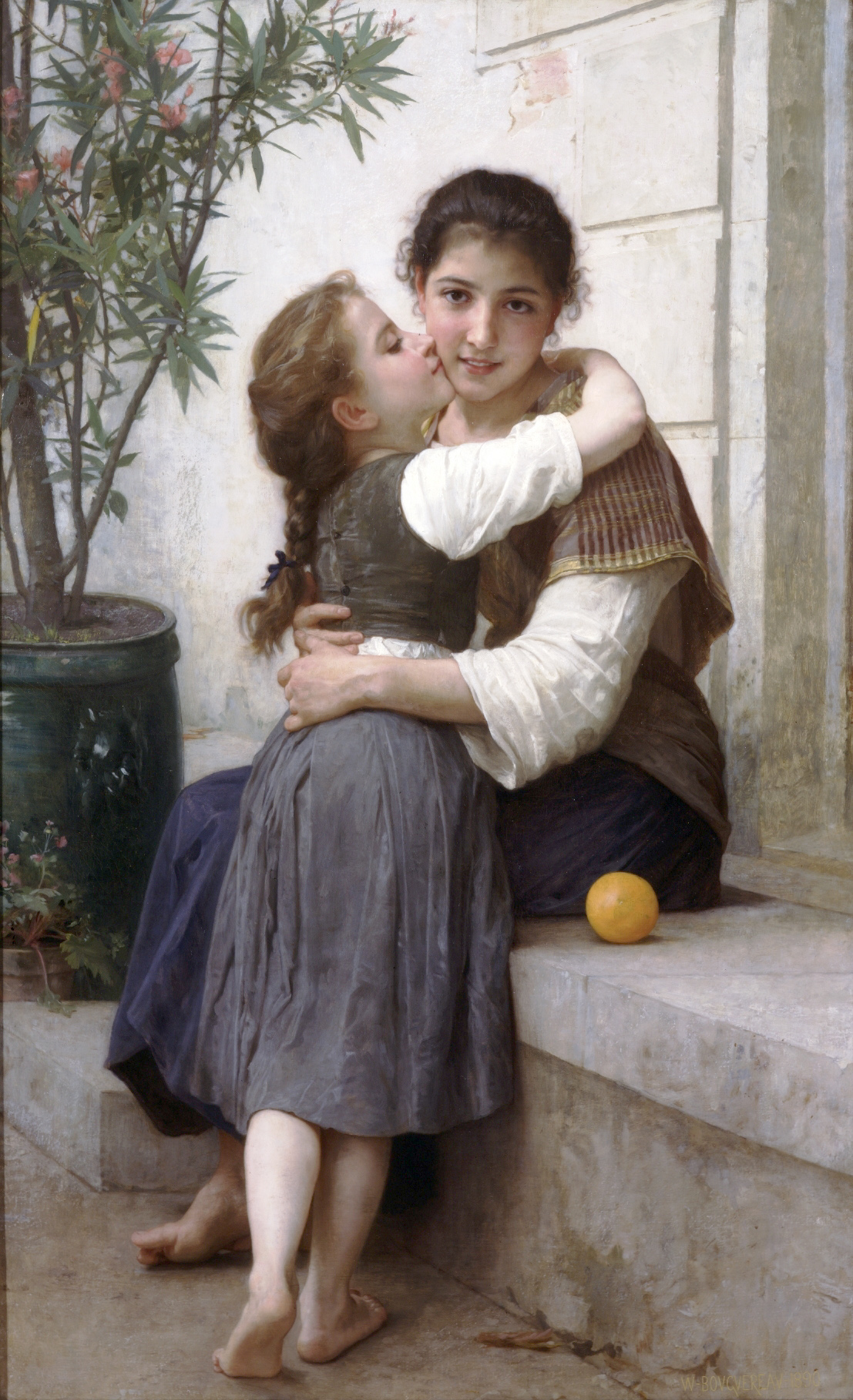
A Little Coaxing (1890, William-Adolphe Bouguereau)

Cheek kissing is an informal greeting or social kissing gesture to indicate friendship, family relationship, perform a greeting, to confer congratulations, to comfort someone, or to show respect.

Cheek kissing is very common in the Middle East, the Mediterranean, Southern, Central and Eastern Europe, the Low Countries, the Horn of Africa, and Latin America. In other countries, including the U.S. and Japan, cheek kissing is common as well at an international meeting between heads of state and First Ladies or members of royal and the Imperial families.

Depending on the local culture, cheek kissing may be considered appropriate among family members as well as friends and acquaintances: a man and a woman, two women, or two men. The last has different degrees of familiarity.

In Eastern Europe, male–female and female–female cheek kissing is a standard greeting among friends, while male–male cheek kisses are less common. Eastern European communist leaders often greeted each other with a socialist fraternal kiss on public and state occasions.

In a cheek kiss, both persons lean forward and either lightly touch cheek with cheek or lip with cheek. Generally the gesture is repeated with the other cheek, or more, alternating cheeks. Depending on country and situation, the number of kisses range from one to four. Hand-shaking or hugging may also take place.

Cheek kissing is used in many cultures with slightly varying meaning and gesture. For example, cheek kissing may or may not be associated with a hug. The appropriate social context for use can vary greatly from one country to the other, though the gesture might look similar.

In cultures and situations where cheek kissing is the social norm, the failure or refusal to give or accept a kiss is commonly taken as an indicator of antipathy between the people, and to dispel such an implication and avoid giving offense may require an explanation, such as the person has a contagious disease such as a cold.

== Europe ==
=== Southern Europe ===
Cheek kissing is a standard greeting throughout Southern Europe between friends or acquaintances, but less common in professional settings. In general, men and women will kiss the opposite sex, and women will kiss women. Men kissing men varies depending on the country and even on the family, in some countries (like Italy) men will kiss men; in others only men of the same family would consider kissing.

Greece is an example of a country where cheek kissing highly depends on the region and the type of event. For example, in most parts of Crete, it is common between a man and a woman who are friends, but is very uncommon between men unless they are very close relatives. In Athens it is commonplace for men to kiss women and women to kiss other women on the cheek when meeting or departing. It is uncommon between strangers of any sex, and it may be considered offensive otherwise. It is standard for children and parents, children and grandparents etc., and in its "formal" form it will be two kisses, one on each cheek. It may be a standard formal form of greeting in special events such as weddings.

However, in Spain, usually, the gender of the kisser doesn't matter as long as they are family or very close friends. In Portuguese families men rarely kiss men (except between brothers or father and son); the handshake is the most common salutation between them. However, men kissing is common in Spain as well particularly when congratulating close friends or relatives. Cheek to cheek and the kiss in the air are also very popular. Hugging is common between men and men and women and women; when the other is from the opposite sex, a kiss may be added. In Italy (especially southern and central Italy) it is common for men to kiss men, especially relatives or friends.

In most Southern European countries, kissing is initiated by leaning to the left side and joining the right cheeks and if there's a second kiss, changing to the left cheeks. In some cases (e.g. some parts of Italy) the process is the opposite, one first leans to the right, joins the left cheeks and then switches to the right cheeks.

=== Southeastern Europe ===
In the former Yugoslavia, cheek kissing is also very commonplace, with the ethnicity being ascertainable by the number of kisses on each cheek. Typically, Croats and Bosniaks will kiss once on each cheek, for two total kisses, whereas Serbs will kiss once, but three times as a traditional greeting, typically starting at the right cheek. In Serbia and Montenegro, it is also common for men to kiss each other on the cheek three times as a form of greeting, usually for people they have not encountered in a while, or during the celebrations (wedding, birthday, New Year, religious celebrations, etc.).

In Bulgaria cheek kissing is practiced to a far lesser extent compared to ex-Yugoslavia and is usually seen only between very close relatives or sometimes between close female friends. Kissing is usually performed by people of the opposite sex and between two women. Men kissing is rare even between close friends and is usually considered unnatural and awkward. Male relatives are more likely to initiate kissing if there is a significant age gap, such as between uncles and nephews, or if both men are elderly.

In Romania, cheek kissing is commonly used as a greeting between a man and a woman or two women, once on each cheek. Men usually prefer handshakes among themselves, though sometimes close male relatives may also practice cheek kissing.

In Albania, cheek kissing is used as a greeting between the opposite sex and also the same sex. The cheek is kissed from left to right on each cheek. Males usually slightly bump their heads or just touch their cheeks (no kissing) so to masculinize the act. Females practice the usual left to right cheek kissing. Albanian old women often kiss four times, so two times on each cheek.

=== Western Europe ===
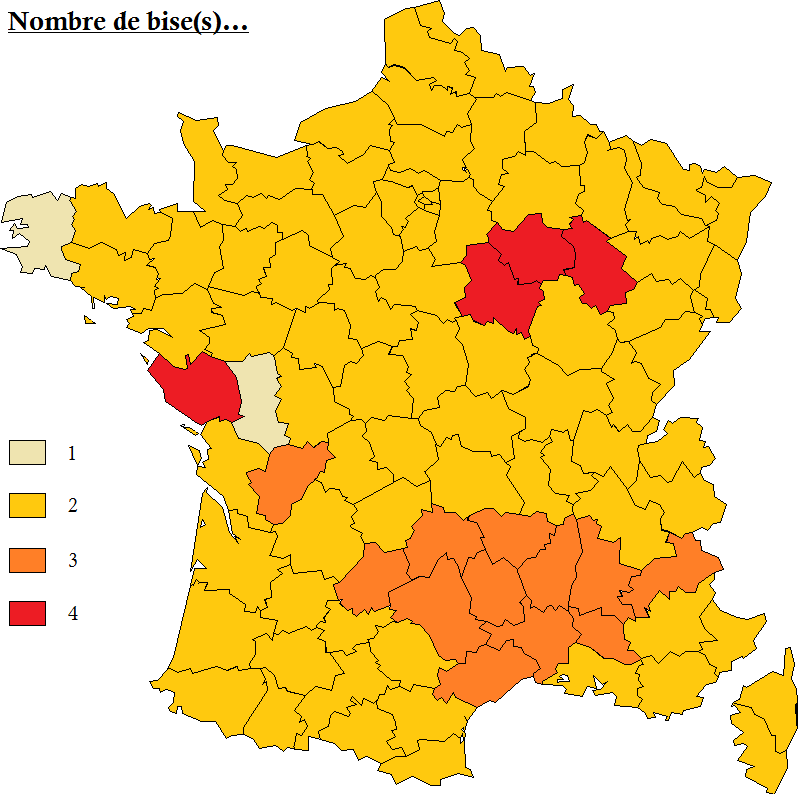
Number of kisses in France

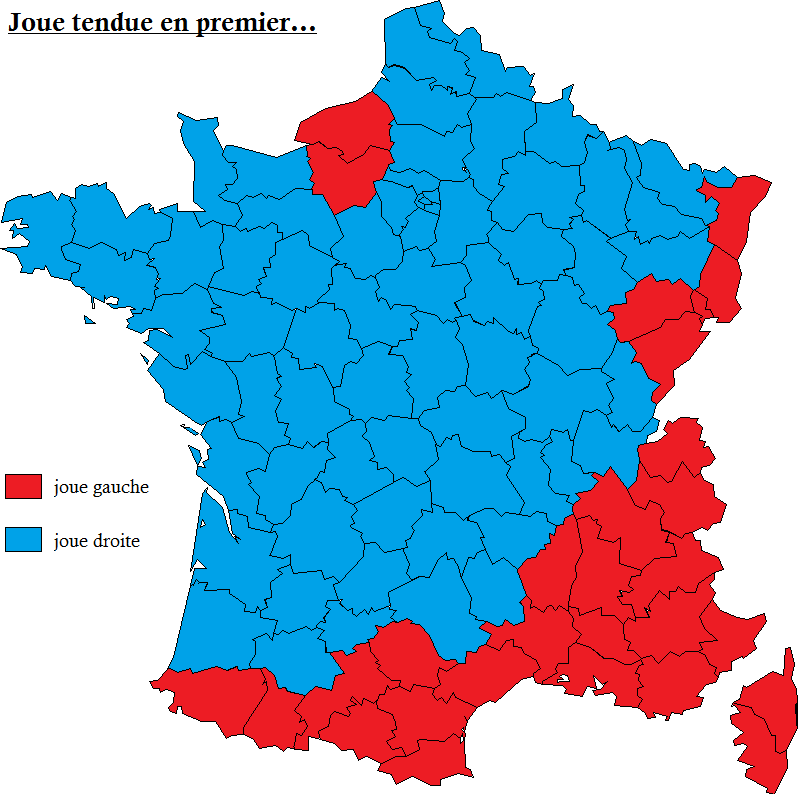
Cheek given for first kiss in France

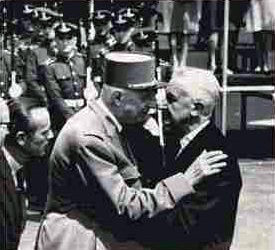
French president Charles de Gaulle kisses Argentine president Arturo Illia in 1964.

In France, cheek kissing is called "faire la bise". A popular French joke states that one may recognize the city one is in by counting the number of cheek kisses, as it varies across the country. It is very common, in the southern parts of France, even between males, be they relatives or friends, whereas in the north (Langue-d'oïl France), it is less usual for two unrelated males to perform ′la bise′. (See Kissing traditions#Greetings.) The custom came under scrutiny during the H1N1 epidemic of 2009.

In the Netherlands and Belgium, cheek kissing is a common greeting between relatives and friends (in the Netherlands slightly more so in the south). Generally speaking, women will kiss both women and men, while men will kiss women but refrain from kissing other men, instead preferring to shake hands with strangers. In the Netherlands usually three kisses are exchanged, mostly for birthdays. The same number of kisses is found in Switzerland and Luxembourg. In Flanders (Belgium), one kiss is exchanged as a greeting, and three to celebrate (e.g., a birthday). In Wallonia (Belgium), the custom is usually one or three kisses, and is also common between men who are friends.

In northern European countries such as Sweden and Germany, hugs are preferred to kisses, though also rare. It is customary in many regions to only have kisses between women and women, but not men and women, who tend to shake hands.

Although cheek kissing is not as widely practiced in the United Kingdom or Ireland as in other parts of Europe, with handshakes and hugs generally being more frequent, it is still common. Generally, a kiss on one cheek is common, while a kiss on each cheek is also practiced by some depending on relation or reason. It is mostly used as a greeting and/or a farewell, but can also be offered as a congratulation or as a general declaration of friendship or love. Cheek kissing is acceptable between parents and children, family members (though not often two adult males), couples, two female friends or a male friend and a female friend. Cheek kissing between two men who are not a couple is unusual but socially acceptable if both men are happy to take part. Cheek kissing is associated with the middle and upper classes, as they are more influenced by French culture. This behaviour was traditionally seen as a French practice.

== Asia ==
=== Southeast Asia ===
In the Philippines, cheek kissing is a common greeting. The Philippine cheek kiss is a cheek-to-cheek kiss, not a lips-to-cheek kiss. The cheek kiss is usually made once (right cheek to right cheek), either between two women, or between a woman and a man. Amongst the upper classes, it is a common greeting among adults who are friends, while for the rest of the population, however, the gesture is generally reserved for relatives. Filipinos who are introduced to each other for the first time do not cheek kiss unless they are related.

In certain communities in Indonesia, notably the Manado or Minahasa people, kissing on the cheeks (twice) is normal among relatives, including males. Cheek kissing in Indonesia is commonly known as cipika-cipiki which is an acronym for cium pipi kanan, cium pipi kiri (kissing right cheek, kissing left cheek)

=== Central, South and East Asia ===
In parts of Central, South, and East Asia with predominantly Buddhist or Hindu cultures, or in cultures heavily influenced by these two religions, cheek kissing is largely uncommon and may be considered offensive, although its instances are now growing.

=== Middle East ===
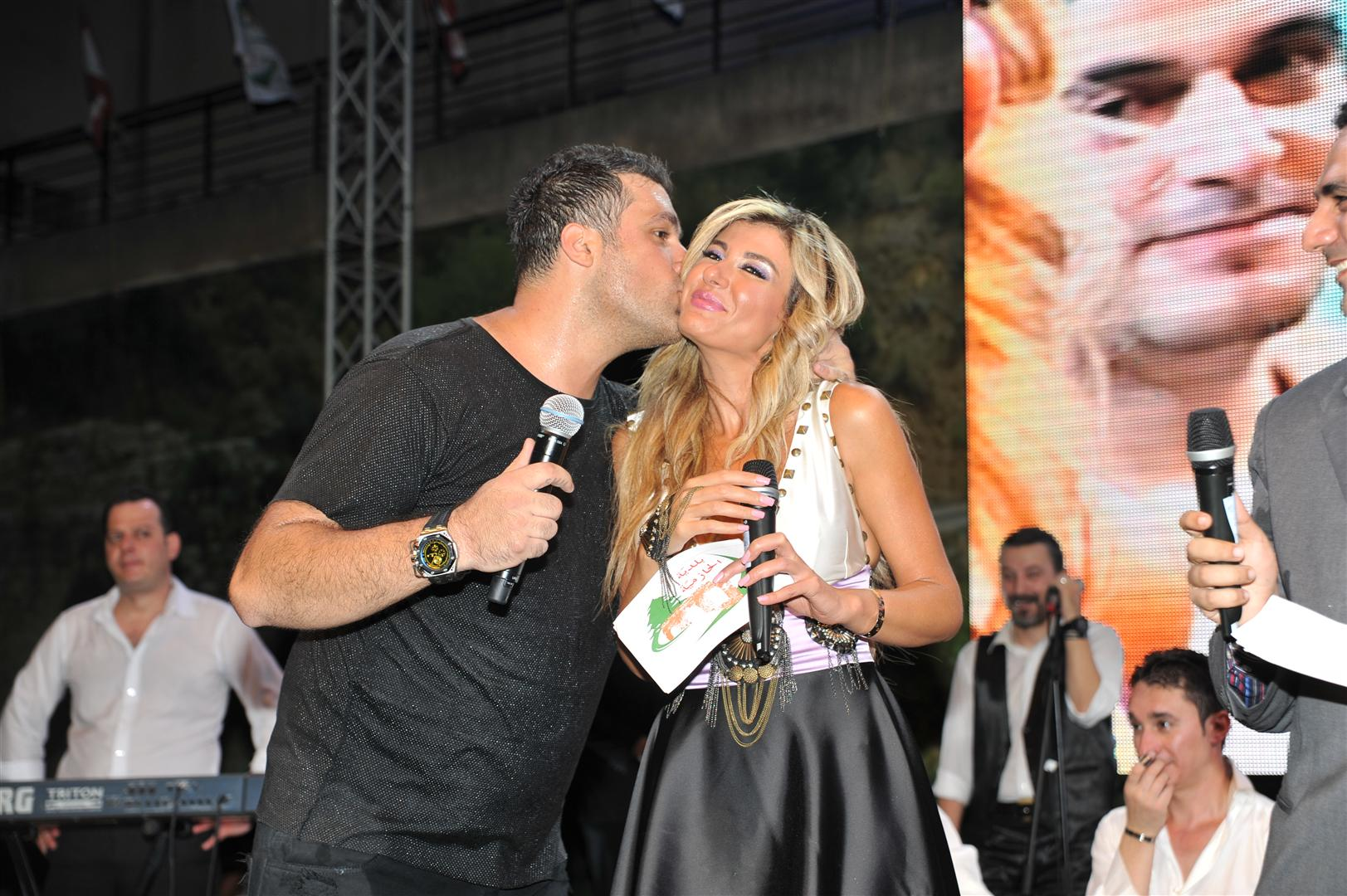
Lebanese singer Fares Karam responds to his audience request to kissing Rita Harb after receiving Hazmieh festival award on July 20, 2012. Harb described it later as a "Brotherly Kissing" and gave him the best wish.

Cheek kissing in the Arab world is very common, between friends and relatives. Cheek kissing between males is very common. However, cheek kissing between a male and female is usually considered inappropriate, unless within the same family; e.g. brother and sister, or if they are a married couple. Some exceptions to this are liberal areas within cities in some of the more liberal Arab countries such as Lebanon, Syria and Jordan, where cheek kissing is a common greeting between unrelated males and females in most communities. The Lebanese custom has become the norm for non-Lebanese in Lebanese-dominated communities of the Arab diaspora. Normally in Lebanon, the typical number of kisses is three: one on the left cheek, then right, and then left between relatives. In other countries, it is typically two kisses with one on each cheek.

Cheek kissing in Turkey is also widely accepted in greetings. Male to male cheek kissing is considered normal in almost every occasion, but very rarely for men who are introduced for the first time. Some men hit each other's head on the side instead of cheek kissing, possibly as an attempt to masculinize the action. Cheek kissing between women is also very common, but it is also very rare for women who are introduced for the first time. A man and a woman could cheek kiss each other for greeting without sexual connotations only if they are good friends or depending on the circle, the setting, and the location like in big cities.

Cheek kissing in Iran is relatively common between friends and family. Cheek kissing between individuals of the same sex is considered normal. However, cheek kissing between male and female in public is considered to be inappropriate, but it may occur among some youth Iranians. In 2014, Leila Hatami, a famous Iranian actress, kissed the president of Cannes Gilles Jacob on the red carpet. Responses ranged from criticism by the Iranian government to support from Iranian opposition parties. Former president of Iran Mahmoud Ahmadinejad kissed the mother of former President of Venezuela Hugo Chávez at his funeral.

== Americas ==
=== United States and Canada ===
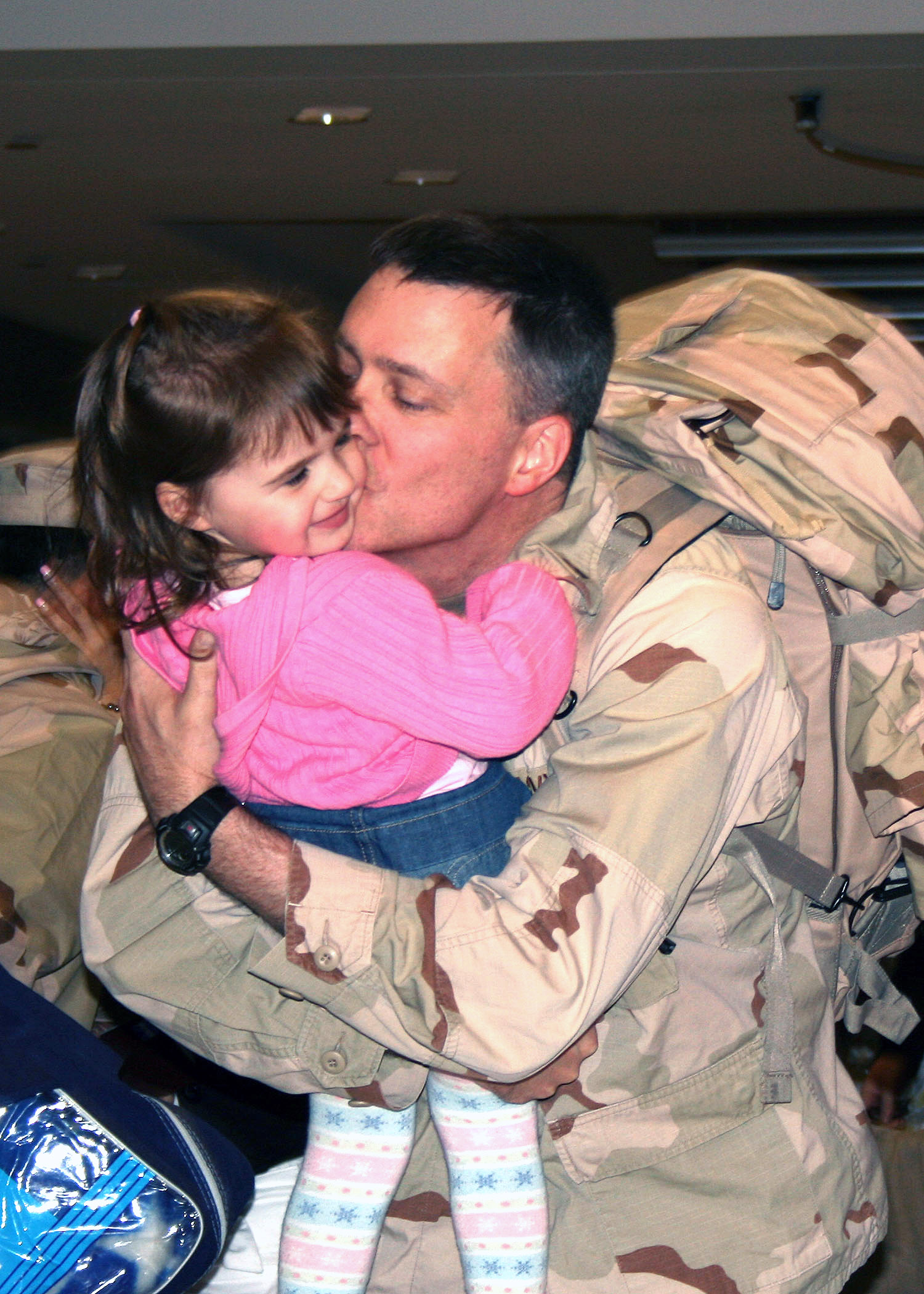
A father kissing the cheek of his daughter

Cheek kissing is not currently a default or standardized greeting in mainstream American culture. Instead, hugs and handshakes are the norm.

In the United States and Canada, the cheek kiss may involve one or both cheeks. According to the March 8, 2004 edition of Time magazine, "a single [kiss] is [an] acceptable [greeting] in the United States, but it's mostly a big-city phenomenon."

Cheek kissing of young children by adults of both sexes is perhaps the most common cheek kiss in North America. Typically, it is a short, perfunctory greeting, and is most often done by relatives.

Giving someone a kiss on the cheek is also a common occurrence between loving couples.

Cheek kissing between adults, when it occurs at all, is most often done between two people who know each other well, such as between relatives or close friends. In this case, a short hug (generally only upper-body contact) or handshake may accompany the kiss. Likewise, hugs are common but not required. A hug alone may also suffice in both of these situations, and is much more common.

In Quebec, cheek kissing is referred to in the vernacular (Québécois) as un bec ("donner un bec") or la bise ("faire la bise"). Whether francophone or other, people of the opposite sex often kiss once on each cheek. Cheek kissing between women is also very common, although men will often refrain. Two people introduced by a mutual friend may also give each other un bec.

Immigrant groups tend to have their own norms for cheek kissing, usually carried over from their native country. In Miami, Florida, an area heavily influenced by Latin American and European immigrants, kissing hello on the cheek is much more the social norm than in the rest of the United States.

=== Latin America ===
In Latin America, cheek kissing is a universal form of greeting between a man and a woman or two women. In some countries, such as Argentina, Chile and Uruguay, men will kiss on the cheek as a greeting.

It is not necessary to know a person well or be intimate with them to kiss them on the cheek. When introduced to someone new by a mutual acquaintance in social settings, it is customary to greet him or her with a cheek kiss if the person being introduced to them is a member of the opposite sex or if a woman is introduced to another woman. If the person is a complete stranger, i.e. self-introductions, no kissing is done. A cheek kiss may be accompanied by a hug or another sign of physical affection. In business settings, the cheek kiss is not always standard upon introduction, but once a relationship is established, it is common practice.

As with other regions, cheek kissing may be lips-to-cheek or cheek-to-cheek with a kiss in the air, the latter being more common.

As in Southern Europe, in Argentina, Chile and Uruguay men kissing men is common but it varies depending on the region, occasion and even on the family. In Argentina and Uruguay it is common (almost standard) between male friends to kiss "a la italiana", e.g. football players kiss each other to congratulate or to greet. In Chile, one cheek kiss is given between male friends (specially young men) and male relatives (despite age and relationship), although sometimes it can be between acquaintances.

In Ecuador it is normal that two male family members greet with a kiss, especially between father and son or grandfather and grandson.

== Africa ==
Cheek kissing is common in the Horn of Africa, which includes Djibouti, Eritrea, Ethiopia, and Somalia, and is also present in countries within the Arab world such as Tunisia and Morocco, but is largely uncommon in most areas south of the Sahara. In South Africa, cheek kisses are usually found among male and female friends, with handshakes or hugs usually being preferable among other people.

== Oceania ==
In Australia and New Zealand, cheek kissing is usually present among close friends, but handshakes or hugs are more common.

In New Zealand, Māori people traditionally greet each other with hongi, but a kiss on the cheek is often given in place of, or in addition to, a hongi when at least one of the people greeting the other is a woman, especially an older woman. For this reason, a kiss on the cheek is sometimes used to greet older Māori or Pasifika women even in professional settings.

== See also ==
- Greeting habits
- Hug
- Hand-kissing
- Kiss of peace
- Paschal greeting
- Public display of affection
- Salute
- Socialist fraternal kiss
