= Socialist fraternal kiss =

Greeting between Eastern Bloc leaders

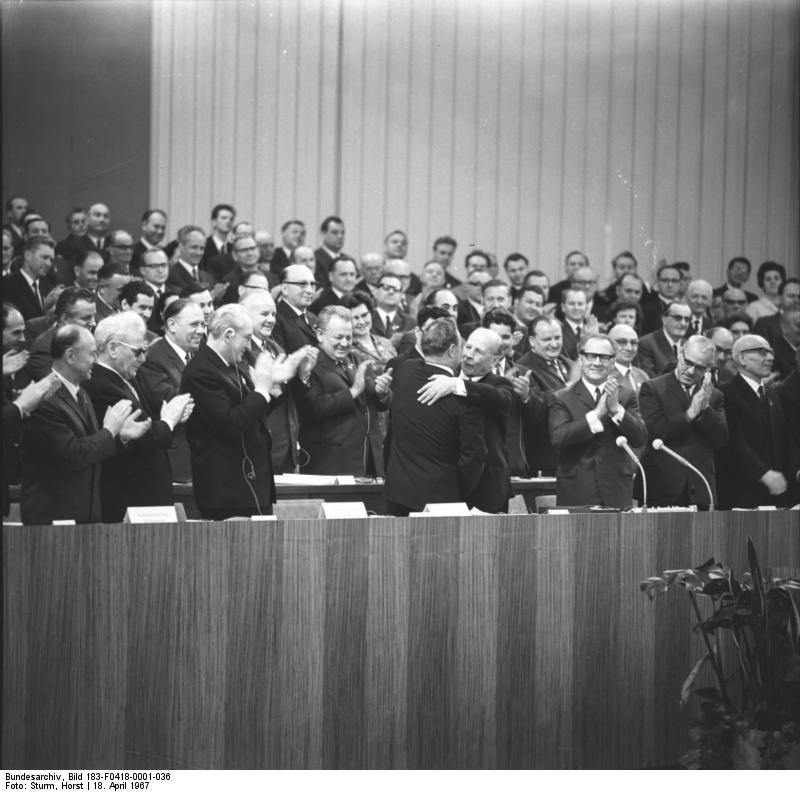
Socialist fraternal kiss exchanged between Walter Ulbricht and Leonid Brezhnev in 1967

The socialist fraternal kiss was a special form of greeting between socialist state officials. The act demonstrated the special relationship that exists between Communist countries, consisting of an embrace, along with a series of three kisses on alternate cheeks. In rare cases, when the two statesmen considered themselves on exceptionally good terms, the kisses were given on the mouth rather than on the cheeks.

The socialist fraternal embrace consists of a series of three deep hugs, alternating between the left and right sides of the body, without kissing. This modified greeting was adopted by Marxist–Leninist statesmen in Asia, which lacks a tradition of cheek kissing as greeting. During the Cold War, Marxist–Leninist officials in Asia consented to receive kisses from Europeans and Cubans, but they themselves omitted the kiss.

== History ==
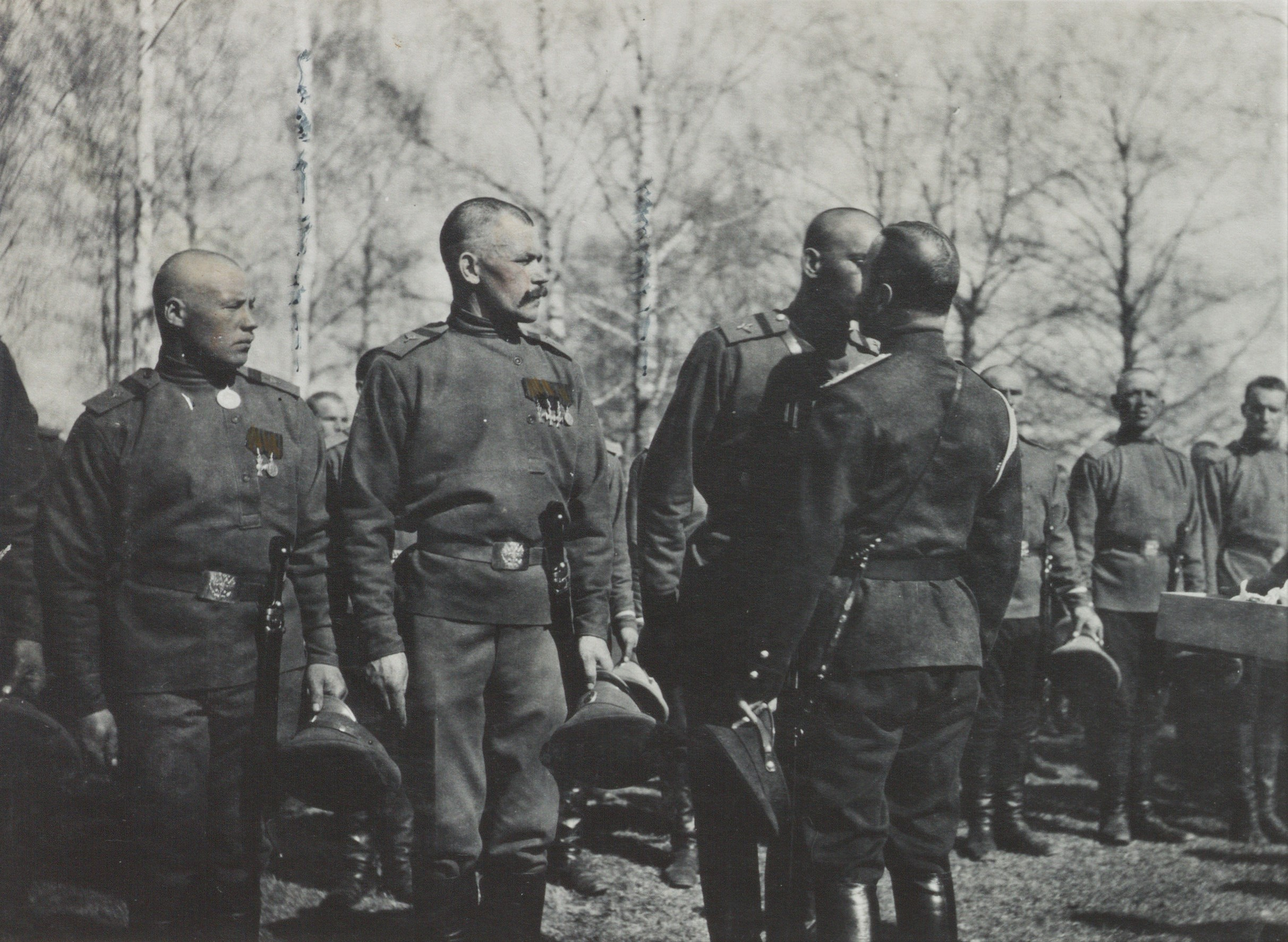
Tsar of Russia Nicholas II gives a kiss of peace to a soldier, 1916.

This ritual originated in the European practice of cheek kissing as a greeting between family members or good friends. It has also been associated with the Eastern Orthodox fraternal kiss. It was in use already in the Russian Empire, among soldiers and officers.

With the expansion of Communism after World War II, the USSR was no longer isolated as the only Communist country. The fraternal socialist kiss became a ritualised greeting among the officials of Communist countries. The greeting was also adopted by socialist officials in the Third World, as well as the officials of socialist-aligned liberation movements such as the Palestine Liberation Organization and the African National Congress of South Africa.

== Kremlinology ==
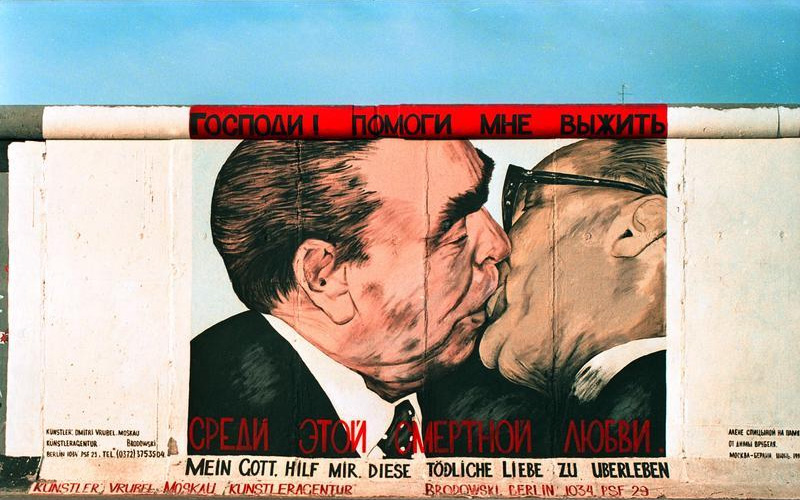
My God, Help Me to Survive This Deadly Love, a graffiti painting on the Berlin Wall depicting Soviet statesman Leonid Brezhnev kissing East German statesman Erich Honecker

Kremlinologists paid attention to whether the fraternal embrace was exchanged between Communist officials. The omission of the customary embrace indicated a lower level of relations between the two countries.

After the Sino-Soviet division, the Chinese refused to embrace their Soviet counterparts or to address them as "comrade". When Soviet premier Nikita Khrushchev tried to embrace Chinese Communist Party chairman Mao Zedong on a visit to Beijing in 1959, Mao stepped back to avoid the embrace and offered a handshake instead. Even with the normalization of relations in 1989, the Chinese continued to omit the fraternal embrace when greeting Soviet officials. This was done to emphasize that Sino-Soviet relations were not returning to the pre-split level of the 1950s; Chinese protocol specifically insisted on "handshake, no embrace".

== Cheek kissing ==
The socialist fraternal kiss should not be confused with ordinary cheek kissing between officials. For example, it is traditional for the President of France to greet his foreign counterparts by kissing them on both cheeks.
